= Frankfurt Airport Terminal 1 =

Terminal in Frankfurt Airport

Terminal 1
- View into Departure Hall B

General information
- Location: Frankfurt International Airport, Frankfurt, 60547, Hessen, Germany
- Coordinates: 50°03′00″N 8°34′14″E
- Years built: 1955 (tower), 1965–1972 (terminal), 2000–2012 (extensions)
- Cost: 1 billion DM (Deutsche Mark), equivalent to 580–600 million USD
- Client: Flughafen Aktiengesellschaft Frankfurt/Main

Technical details
- Grounds: 930,000 m^{2} (10,000,000 sq ft)

Design and construction
- Architects: Alois Giefer, Hermann Mäckler, Heinrich Kosina

Terminal 1 is the oldest and largest of the three current main terminals at Frankfurt Airport. At the time of its opening in 1972, it was the largest airport terminal in Europe and the first to have a fully automated baggage handling system. This made the airport well-suited as a hub for numerous airlines. Prior to the construction of the airport's second terminal, it was officially named Terminal Mitte ('middle terminal') for this role in serving connecting flights.

== Architecture ==
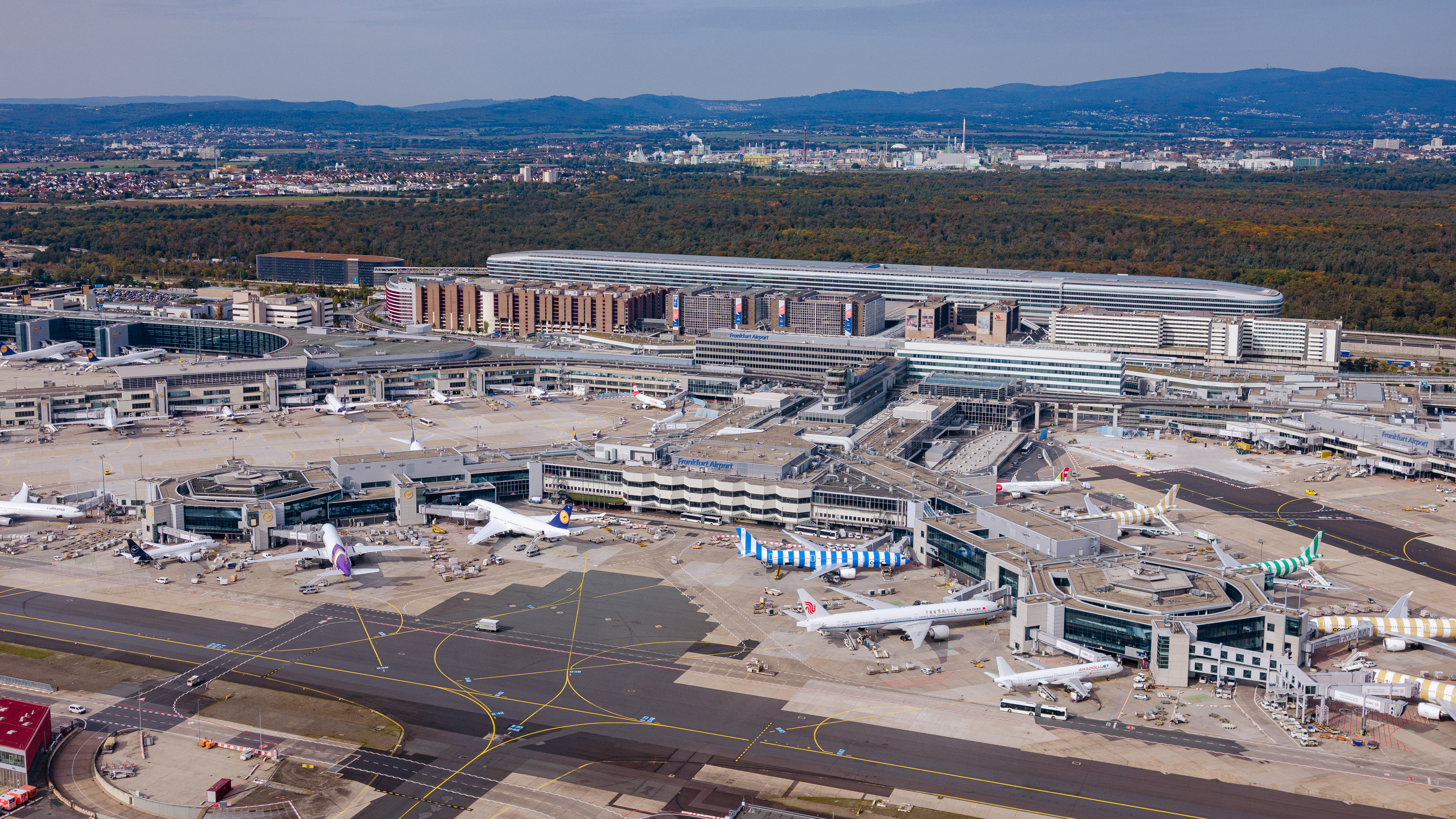
Terminal 1 from the airside

Terminal 1 is horizontally divided into three sections, from west to east: A/Z, B, and C. Each section is vertically divided into arrival and departure facilities, as well as distribution levels, each with its own entrances, exits, and connecting passages. In depth, the terminal is divided into a northern landside section and a southern airside section.

At the center of the complex rises the 250-square-metre, seven-story office tower, which—together with the old control tower and the connecting structure spanning Gate B—resembles a "T" when viewed from the air.

== History ==
=== Planning ===
After operational control of Frankfurt Airport was returned to the Verkehrs-Aktiengesellschaft Rhein-Main (formerly Südwestdeutsche Flugbetriebs AG, now Fraport) in 1950, and as it became evident that passenger numbers would rise beyond the capacity of the existing 1935 terminal building, it was decided to hold an architectural competition for a new terminal.

The competition was won by the Frankfurt-based architectural firm of Alois Giefer and Hermann Mäckler. The design remained unchanged. An important aspect of the new terminal was not only increased capacity but also rapid passenger processing times, allowing for efficient connections. The Rhein-Main Planning Office, established for the planning phase, consisted of the competition winners—Giefer and Mäckler—as well as the architect Heinrich Kosina.

Initially, the focus was on a new control tower, construction of which began in July 1955. The control tower was built on supports, with the intention of integrating it into the new terminal at a later stage. Further work was suspended in favour of extending the existing terminal with a front-facing annex, forming the East Terminal complex.

In 1961, planning of the new terminal resumed. It was designed to handle up to 15 million passengers—roughly seven times the passenger volume recorded that year.

The project's working title was "New Western Reception Facility", as it was to be located west of the existing reception facility.

=== Construction ===
The cornerstone was laid on 16 June 1965 by the Hessian Minister of Economic Affairs, Rudi Arndt. At the time, it was the largest construction site in Europe.

In 1967, the construction project was revised and expanded to include the halls for sections A and C (which had previously been planned as a future upgrade), and more gates for larger aircraft. These changes were made due to new passenger forecasts and the anticipated arrival of the Boeing 747 wide-bodied aircraft.

During construction, the site of the receiving facility was the largest in Europe. For the structural shell alone, 200,000 cubic metres of concrete were used. Contemporary accounts compared this volume to the contents of a freight train spanning the distance between Frankfurt and Paris.

On 28 January 1970, more than two years before the terminal's official opening, Boeing 747–100 "Clipper Red Jacket" landed at Frankfurt Airport. The aircraft was on its maiden transatlantic flight and was diverted from its planned destination of London Heathrow due to fog. The large airliner was able to use one of the passenger jet bridges at the under-construction terminal.

Construction costs rose from the 300 million DM planned in 1965 (649 million EUR) to 1 billion DM in 1972 (1.766 billion EUR).

=== Inauguration ===
On 14 March 1972, President of Germany Gustav Heinemann ceremonially inaugurated the new terminal building, then designated as Terminal Mitte. The name was selected following a public appeal by the FAG (Flughafen Frankfurt/Main AG, translates to Frankfurt/Main Airport stock corporation) for name suggestions, prevailing over proposals such as World Airport, Germania Airport, Eurowest Airport, Höhenflug Weltstation, Porta Europa, and Goethe Airport. Heinemann remarked:

I wish Frankfurt Airport safe takeoffs and safe landings at all times. With this wish, I now officially put the new reception facility into operation with the push of a button. Good luck!

— Gustav Heinemann,

It was also reported that Heinemann described the terminal as a suit that was two sizes too big. He was presumably referring to the new terminal's maximum capacity—30 million passengers—which was nearly 2 and a half times bigger the then-current passenger volume (approx. 11.6 million).

At the time of its opening, Terminal Mitte was unique in many respects. It was the largest airport terminal in Europe and featured the world's largest underground parking garage, with a capacity of 6,000 cars. Furthermore, it was one of the first facilities of its kind worldwide to put a fully automated Baggage handling system into operation. It also has an airport clinic.

Shortly after the opening, the airport chaplaincy also followed, housed in its own chapel.

Condition shortly after opening

Departure Hall

Arrivals Hall

Departure board

Parking garage

Restaurant Graf Zeppelin

=== Former facilities ===
With the opening of Terminal Mitte, the new visitors' terrace on Level 3 of the building also opened. Visitors could access the roof of Pier B via two exits located in sections A and C, respectively. From the ends of the Y-shaped pier, views were possible in almost every direction. At the time of its opening, the visitors' terrace featured several restaurants and a Japanese garden. The visitors' terrace was temporarily closed following the September 11 attacks, and has been permanently out of service since 2006. Since then, the airport's only visitors' terrace has been located at Terminal 2.

In 1973, a Jumbo supermarket opened; this was followed in 1977 by three cinemas, and in 1978 by the Dorian Gray nightclub. The nightclub was forced to close at the end of 2000. The supermarket and the cinemas also no longer exist today.

=== Bomb attack ===
On 19 June 1985, at 2:42 p.m., a bomb exploded inside a waste bin in Departure Hall B. Three people were killed in the blast, and 74 others sustained injuries—one of which was fatal. To date (Aug 27, 2026), it remains the largest attack carried out against a German airport. In the days following the incident, authorities received the highest number of distinct claims of responsibility recorded to that time. As of January 2019, those responsible for the attack have yet to be conclusively identified. The police attribute the attack to the Abu Nidal Organization (ANO), a terrorist splinter group of the PLO. Abu Nidal and Khaled Ibrahim Mahmood—who served a lengthy prison sentence for his involvement in the December 1985 attack on Rome-Fiumicino Airport—are considered to be the masterminds of the plot. The three other suspected perpetrators remain under active arrest warrants.

=== Later changes ===
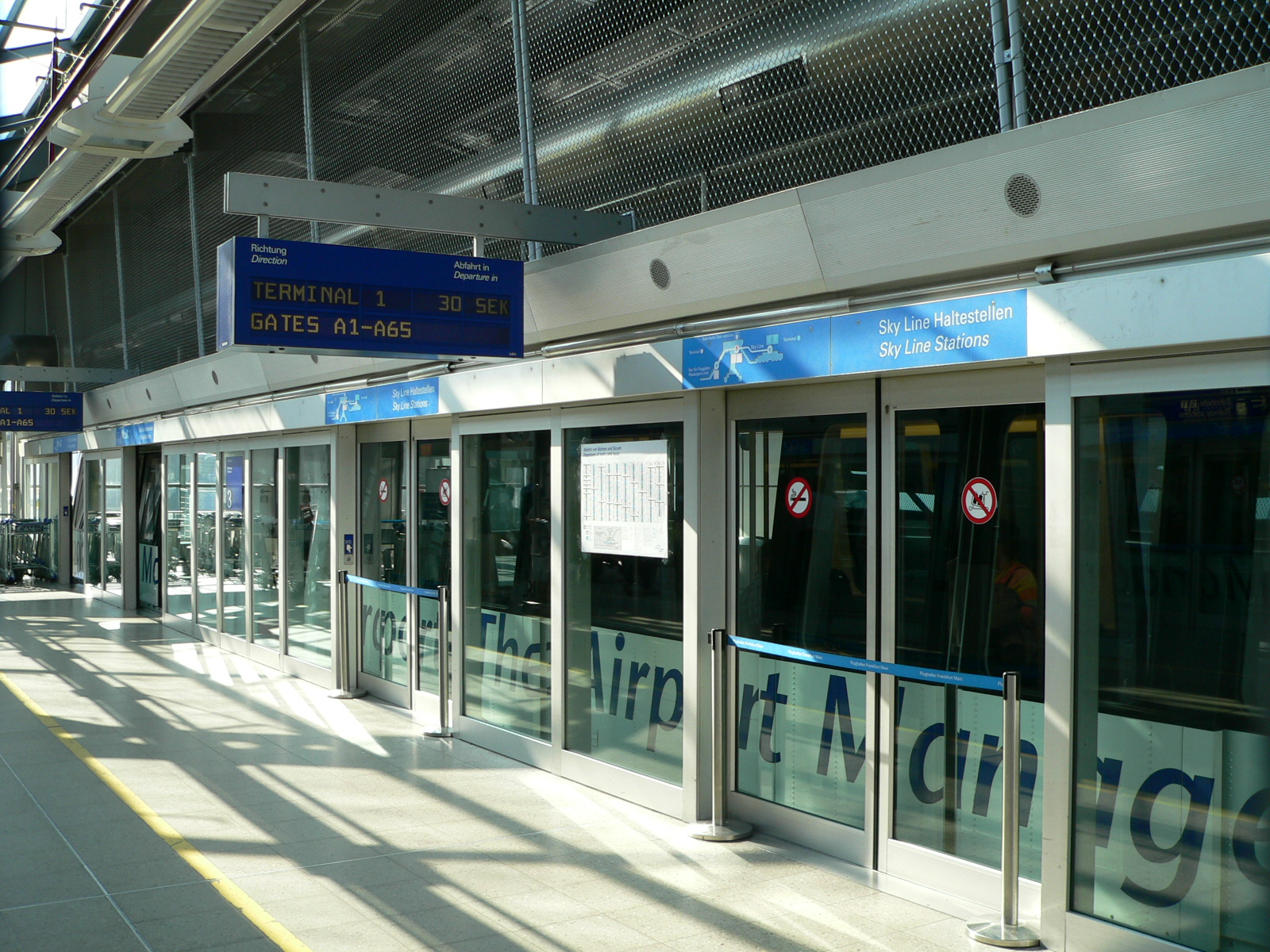
SkyLine Station B/C with original destination displays

With the opening of Terminal 2, the name "Terminal 1" was applied for the first time. Furthermore, a station for the SkyLine people mover was initially opened within Terminal 1: Station B/C is situated above the rear section of Departure Hall B. Since then, the SkyLine has connected Terminal 1 with Terminal 2. A second station, A/Z, followed a few years later and is located at the beginning of Pier A.

Starting in 2006, the B-West and B-East gates were redesigned to comply with regulatory requirements (fire safety regulations and the implementation of EU directives regarding the spatial separation of arriving and departing passengers). Additional stands for the Airbus A380 were also constructed in this area. The observation deck was removed during these renovations, as the gate structure was expanded vertically.

Major changes have also been implemented at Pier A since 2000. On 29 March 2000, a 500-square-metre-long, angled extension of the pier was opened. In 2006, construction began on the expansion known as Pier A-Plus. A new distribution hall was erected at the base of the existing pier, adjacent to Departure Hall A. From this distribution hall, Pier A-Plus branches off from the original Pier A and follows the alignment of the Departure Hall westward for 600 metres. This pier was designed to accommodate Airbus A380 operations and increases the airport's annual capacity by 6 million passengers. Pier A-Plus was opened on 10 October 2012. To make way for this extension, Maintenance Hangar 3—designed by Hannsgeorg Beckert and known as the "Butterfly Hangar"—had to be demolished.

New areas for dining and shopping were created in all three terminal halls. An extension to Hall A was constructed to accommodate additional security lanes. This measure aims to alleviate the strain on the existing, overburdened security checkpoints.

In 2016, the façade of the departure area was renovated and has since featured distinctive LED light strips.

In 2021, Fraport's new visitor center was opened in the area of Departure Hall C.

On 23 February 2026, a second Skyline line commenced operations at the bus station in front of the terminal building. Since April 2026, this line was connected to the new Terminal 3.

== Operation ==
=== Flight operations ===
Lufthansa is the main user of Terminal 1.

Terminal 1—comprising the four passenger areas A, B, C, and Z—handles all flights operated by Lufthansa and its subsidiaries (Lufthansa CityLine, SWISS, Austrian Airlines, Brussels Airlines, Discover Airlines), as well as its partner airlines within the Star Alliance network (including Aegean Airlines, Air Canada, Air China, All Nippon Airways, EgyptAir, Singapore Airlines, South African Airways, Thai Airways International, Turkish Airlines, and United Airlines). Airlines with no affiliation to Lufthansa or the Star Alliance are also processed in Terminal 1, including El Al and—since the merger—LATAM Airlines.

Airlines in Terminal 1
Airline	Departure Hall
Aegean Airlines	B
Air Canada	B/C
Air China	C
Air Dolomiti	B
Air India	B/C
airBaltic	B/C
AJet	C
All Nippon Airways	B
Asiana Airlines	C
Austrian Airlines	B
Brussels Airlines	B
Condor Flugdienst	C
Croatia Airlines	C
DAT	A/B
Discover Airlines	B
Egypt Air	B
El Al	C
Ethiopian Airlines	C
Eurowings	C
ITA Airways	B
LATAM Airlines	C
Polskie Linie Lotnicze LOT	B/C
Lufthansa	A/B
Lufthansa City	A/B
Singapore Airlines	B/C
SunExpress	C
Swiss	B
TAP Air Portugal	B/C
Thai Airways International	C
Turkish Airlines	C
United Airlines	B

Operationally, the terminal is divided into a public area and a security area. The security area is accessible to passengers only upon presentation of a boarding pass and completion of a security check. The security checkpoints are located in sections A/Z and B, situated at the transitions between the departure halls and the boarding gates. Additionally, a checkpoint is located at the SkyLine station in section A/Z. Processing is conducted according to travel class. It is also possible to reserve a specific time slot. In section C, security screening takes place directly at the gate.

A further operational distinction is made between the Schengen and non-Schengen areas (ie: for passengers traveling between EU common visa countries and those passing through border controls). For non-Schengen flights, it is necessary to verify passengers' passports. In Section A/Z, this distinction is implemented at the gates: Gate A (Schengen) is located on Level 2, while Gate Z (non-Schengen) is situated on Level 3. In Section B, the front portion of the gate—facing the departure hall—is reserved for Schengen flights; passport control takes place in the area facing the apron, as well as on the upper level (Level 3). This operational division has been in place since the terminal's commissioning and explains the open area located at the end of the main stem of the Y-shaped gate structure—an area originally designated as the "International Waiting Hall." In contrast, the gate is reserved exclusively for non-Schengen flights. Passport control is conducted immediately upon entering the gate area.

=== Baggage handling ===
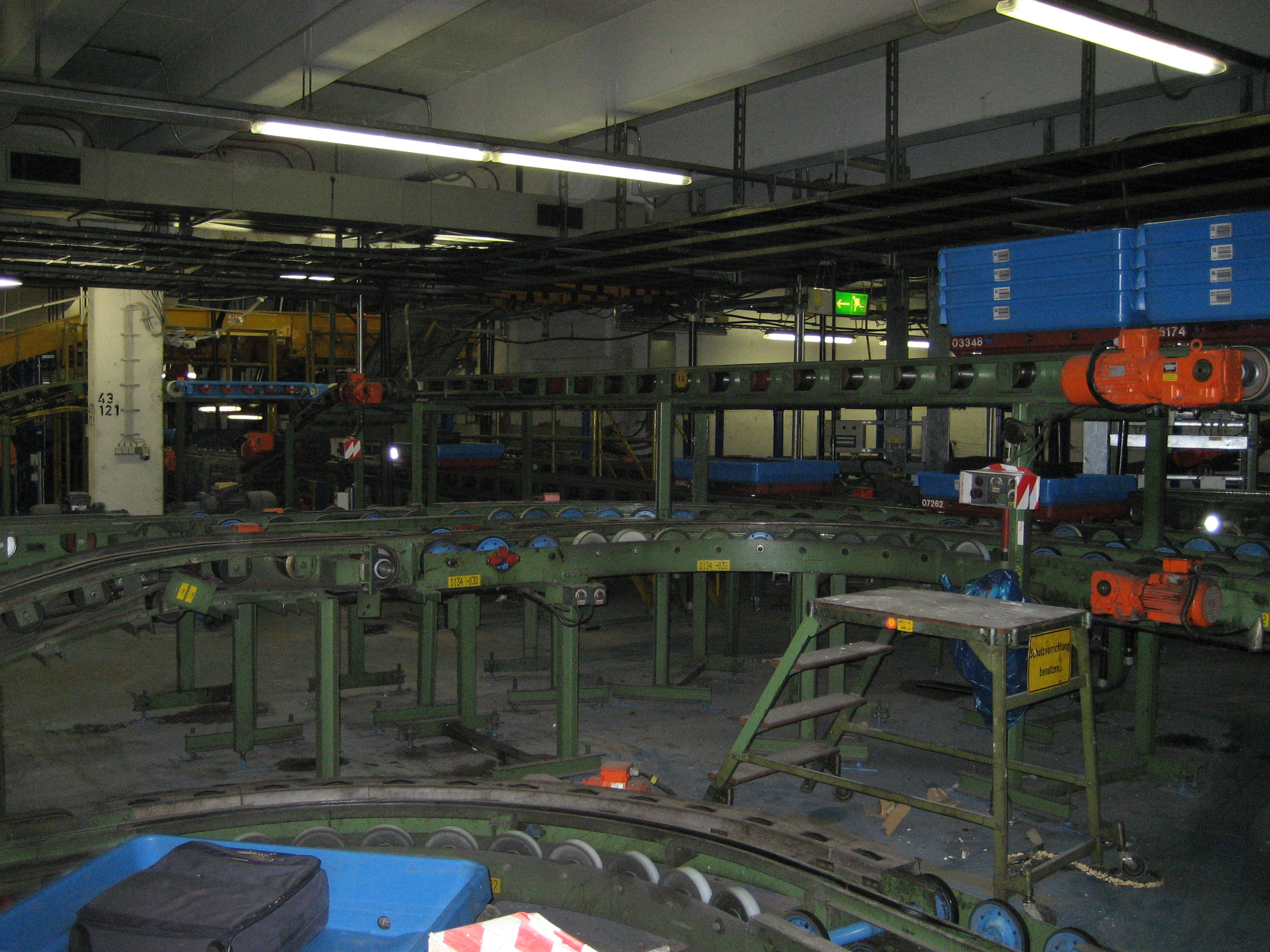
Baggage handling system in Terminal 1

Given its high volume of transit traffic, the baggage handling system at Frankfurt faces unique demands. With a current network length of 70 kilometres (43 mi), the facility remains unparalleled in terms of size, capacity, performance, and its reliability rate of 99.6 percent. Operating at conveyor speeds of up to five metres per second, approximately 18,000 pieces of luggage per hour travel via an underground network to one of 78 designated offloading points. Each year, approximately 38.5 million pieces of luggage are transported across a system comprising over 6,000 belt conveyors, 6,700 roller conveyors, 2,420 curves, and 1,100 switches. Located along the conveyor lines, 650 decoders (scanning stations) identify the destination-coded baggage trays, thereby ensuring punctual and seamless operations.

=== Public transportation ===
Bus station at Terminal 1

The airport's regional railway station is located beneath the entrance area situated to the north of the terminal. It opened together with the terminal building in 1972 and has been connected to the Rhine-Main S-Bahn network since 1980.

Upon its opening, all bus lines that had previously served the former terminal building were rerouted to the new terminal. These included the short-lived express bus line 41—which became redundant with the opening of the train station—and extant lines 61, 62 and 73, serving Sachsenhausen, Schwanheim and Kelsterbach respectively.

Today, 16 regional and city bus lines operate from ten bus bays at the bus station.

Bay	Line No.	destinations
14	AIR	Darmstadt
15	Terminal-Shuttle	
16	61	Frankfurt South Train Station
17	X17	Hofheim Train Station ↔ Neu-Isenburg
17	X19	Obertshausen Train Station
18	62	Schwanheim
18	X61	Frankfurt South Train Station
19	X53	Bolongaropalast
19	n72	Gate 32 ↔ Dietzenbach-Mitte Station (Night service only)
20	OF-64	Sprendlingen
21	X58	Höchst Train Station
21	58	Eschborn
22	72	Bischofsheim
22	73	Höchst industrial park / Kelsterbach
23		Internal airport traffic
24	67	Rüsselsheim
24	82	Raunheim
24	X15	Darmstadt
25		Internal airport traffic

=== Connection with other buildings ===
Terminal 1 features numerous direct connections to other buildings that can be used by passengers and visitors without having to utilize the public road network.

The most important and well-known of these connections is the SkyLine elevated railway. It features three stations—located in sections A/Z, B/C, and C—within Terminal 1, connecting them to Terminal 2. With the exception of the station in Section C, the elevated railway facilitates the segregation of visitors (or passengers traveling within the Schengen Area) from passengers in transit. The station in Section C is accessible exclusively to transit passengers. The SkyLine stations are situated on the third upper floor (Level 4). A fourth station at Terminal 1 is located on the landside, directly in front of the terminal building, positioned above the Arrivals Arch and other public transport facilities. This station is served by a second SkyLine line, which connects Terminal 2 to Terminal 3.

On the second upper floor (Level 3), there is a pedestrian bridge connecting the terminal to the buildings situated to the north. From a distribution hall located above—and positioned between—the Arrivals Arch and the bus station, the flow of visitors is channeled either toward the pedestrian bridge leading to the Frankfurt Airport Center, or toward the pedestrian bridge leading to the Long-Distance Railway Station, the Sheraton Frankfurt Airport Hotel, and the station for the second Skyline line. This distribution hall also houses an elevator providing access to the bus station (Level 0) and to Tracks 2/3 of the Regional Railway Station.

The underground distribution level 0 also provides access to the regional train station and the underground garage.

The connecting tunnel between Gates A and B is for the exclusive use of transit passengers. This 300-square-metre tunnel runs 12 metres beneath the terminal ramp and reduces transfer times.

== Literature ==
- Markus Kutscher: Geschichte der Luftfahrt in Frankfurt am Main. Von Aeronauten und Jumbo-Jets. Frankfurt am Main 1995, ISBN 978-3-524-69110-7.
- Airport der Zukunft: Müller, Karlhans, [and] Milan Skaryd; (Airport) of the future. Terminal Mitte. Rummel. 1972. ISBN 978-3-9800015-0-2.
