= Frankfurt Airport =

Major international airport serving Frankfurt am Main, Hesse, Germany

Frankfurt Airport Flughafen Frankfurt Main

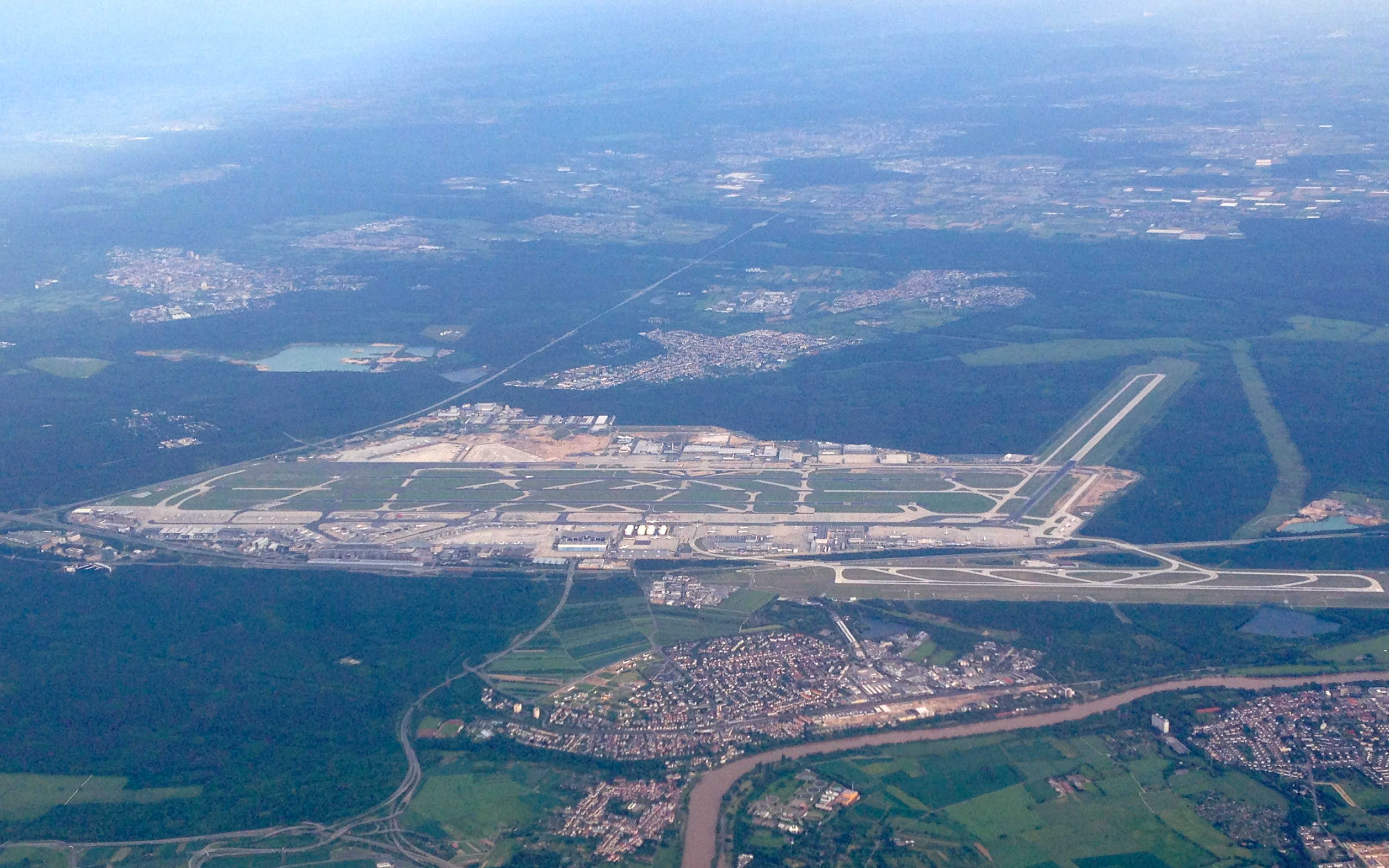
- IATA: FRA; ICAO: EDDF; WMO: 10637

Summary
- Airport type: Public
- Owner/Operator: Fraport AG
- Serves: Frankfurt Rhine-Main
- Location: Frankfurt, Hesse
- Opened: 8 July 1936; 90 years ago
- Hub for: AeroLogic; Lufthansa; Lufthansa Cargo; Lufthansa City Airlines
- Operating base for: Condor; Discover Airlines; SunExpress; TUI fly Deutschland
- Elevation AMSL: 364 ft (111 m)
- Coordinates: 50°02′00″N 8°34′14″E
- Website: www.frankfurt-airport.com

Maps
- Location within Germany FRA/EDDF (Europe)
- Interactive map of Frankfurt Airport

Runways
Direction	Length		Surface
Direction	m	ft	Surface
07L/25R (Note: used for landings only)	2,800	9,240	Concrete
07C/25C	4,000	13,123	Asphalt
07R/25L	4,000	13,123	Asphalt
18 (Note: used for take-offs in one direction only)	4,000	13,123	Concrete

Statistics (2025)
- Passengers: 63,186,114 ▲2.6%
- Cargo (t): 2,071,665 ▲1.1%
- Aircraft movements: 460,272 ▲4.4%
- Economic impact (2016): $22.3 billion
- Sources: Traffic, ADV, AIP at German air traffic control.

Frankfurt Airport (German: Flughafen Frankfurt Main [ˈfluːkhaːfn̩ ˈfʁaŋkfʊʁt ˈmaɪn]; IATA: FRA, ICAO: EDDF) is an international airport located in Frankfurt, Germany's fifth-largest city. It is Germany's busiest airport by passenger numbers. Its official name according to the German Aeronautical Information Publication is Frankfurt Main Airport. The airport is operated by Fraport and serves as the main hub for Lufthansa, including Lufthansa City Airlines, Discover Airlines and Lufthansa Cargo as well as Condor and AeroLogic. It covers an area of 2,300 hectares (5,683 acres) of land and features three passenger terminals with capacity for approximately 65 million passengers per year; four runways; and extensive logistics and maintenance facilities.

Frankfurt Airport is the busiest airport by passenger traffic in Germany as well as the 6th busiest in Europe after London–Heathrow, Istanbul, Paris–Charles de Gaulle, Amsterdam Airport Schiphol and Adolfo Suárez Madrid–Barajas Airport. The airport is also the 22nd busiest worldwide by total number of passengers in 2024, with 61,564,957 passengers using the airport in 2024. It also had a freight throughput of 2.076 million tonnes in 2015 and is the busiest airport in Europe by cargo traffic. As of 2022, Frankfurt Airport serves 330 destinations on five continents, making it the airport with the most direct routes in the world.

The southern side of the airport ground was home to the Rhein-Main Air Base, which served as a major air base for the United States from 1947 until its closure on 31 December 2005. The US personnel moved to Ramstein Air Base (extended from 2004 to 2006). The property was acquired by Fraport and the site now occupied by the airport's Terminal 3.

== Location ==
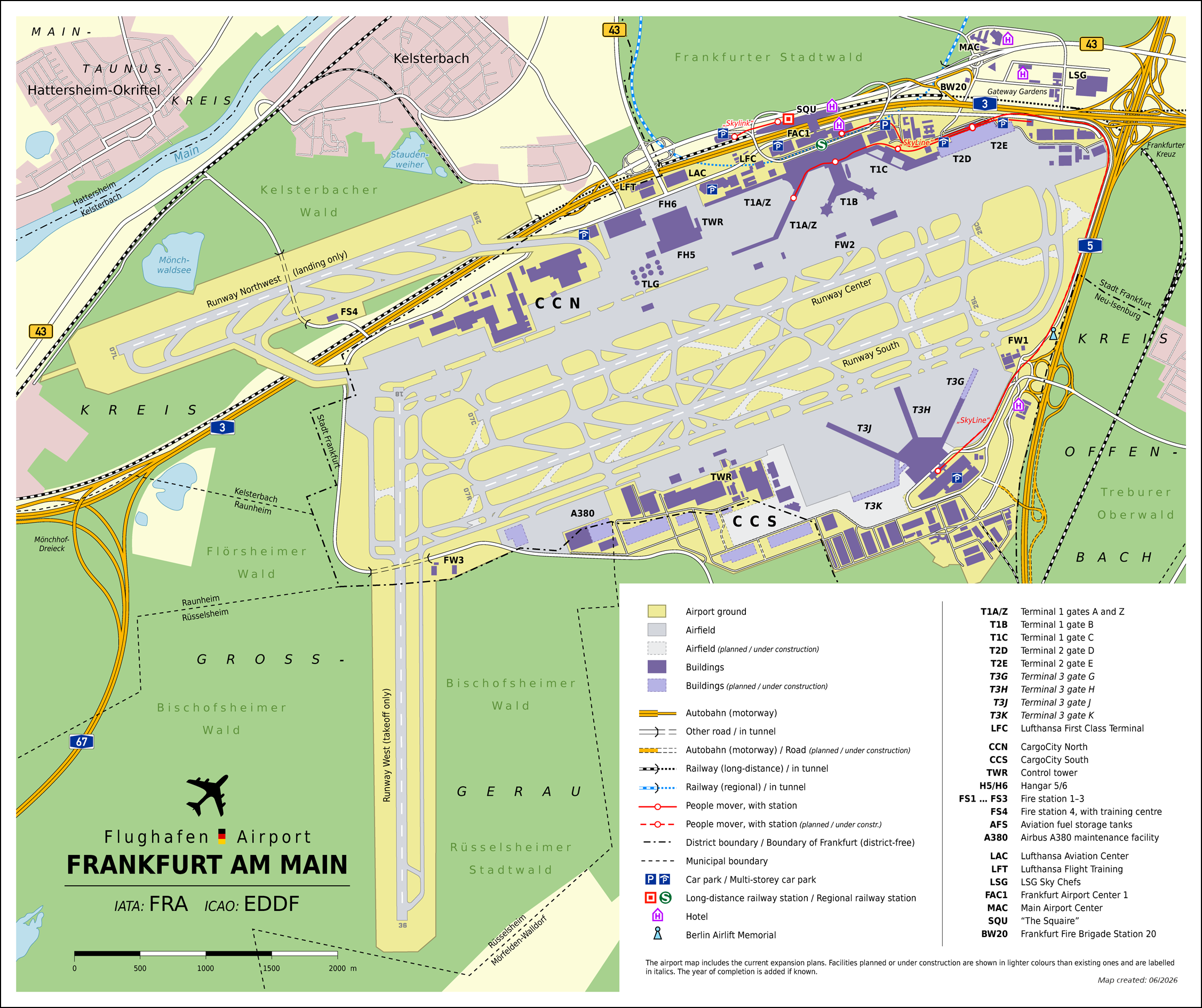
Airport map with planned and already constructed expansions

Frankfurt Airport lies 12 kilometres (7.5 miles) southwest of central Frankfurt, near the Autobahn interchange Frankfurter Kreuz, where two of the most heavily used motorways in Europe (A3 and A5) meet. The airport grounds, which form a city district of Frankfurt named Frankfurt-Flughafen, are surrounded by the Frankfurt City Forest. The southern portion of the airport grounds extend partially into the towns of Rüsselsheim am Main and Mörfelden-Walldorf, and a western portion of the grounds lie within the town of Kelsterbach.

The airport is centrally located in the Frankfurt/Rhine-Main region, Germany's third-largest metropolitan region, which itself has a central location in the densely populated region of the west-central European megalopolis. Thereby, along with a strong rail and motorway connection, the airport serves as a major transport node for the greater region, less than two hours by ground to Cologne, the Ruhr Area, and Stuttgart.

== History ==
=== First airport ===
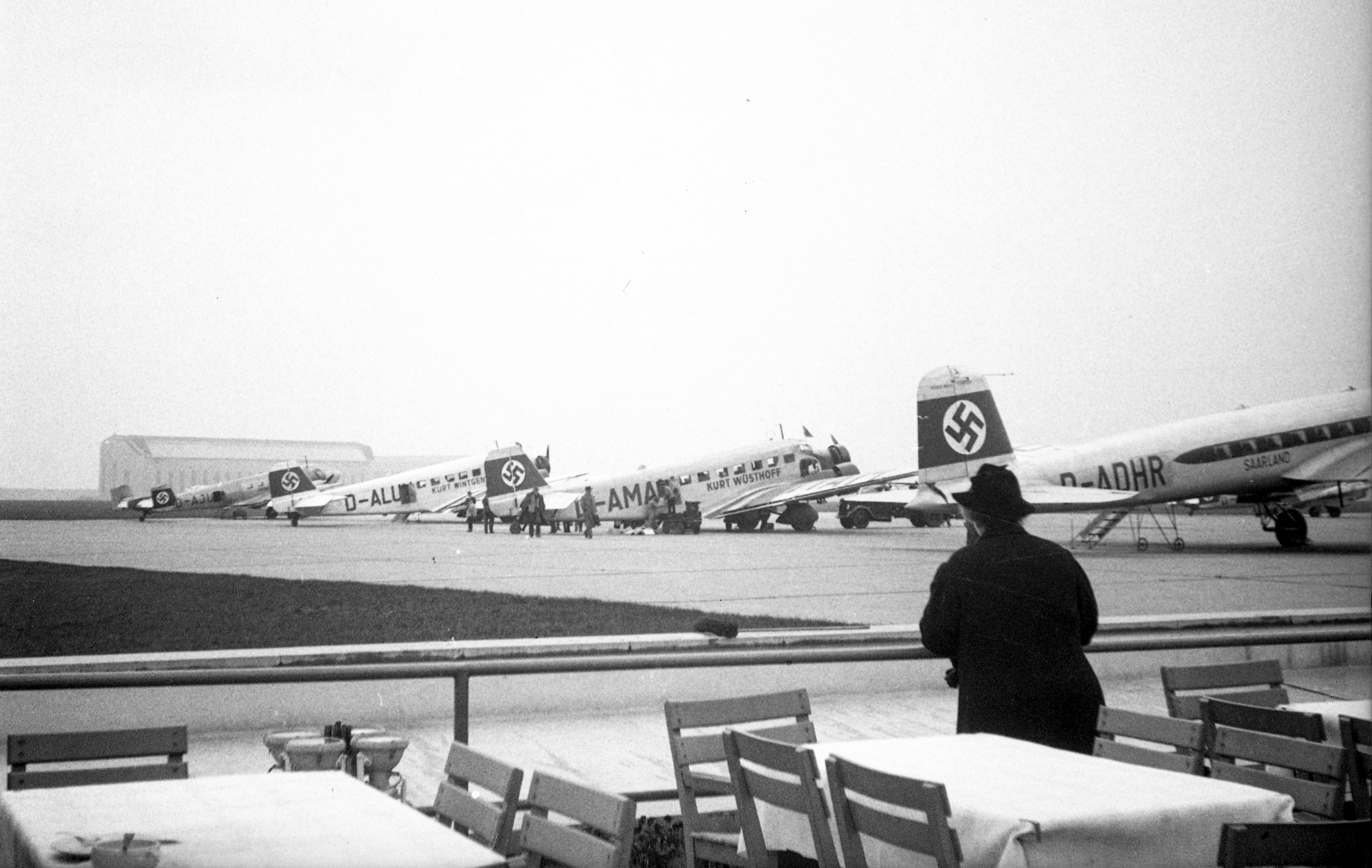
Frankfurt Airport in 1936, with one Ju 86, two Ju 52/3ms and one Fw 200 of Deutsche Lufthansa

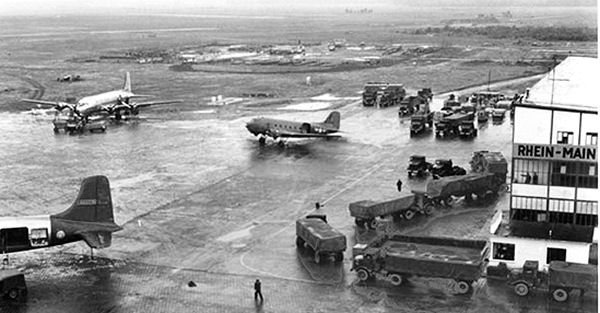
Rhein-Main Air Base during the Berlin Airlift

=== The Squaire ===
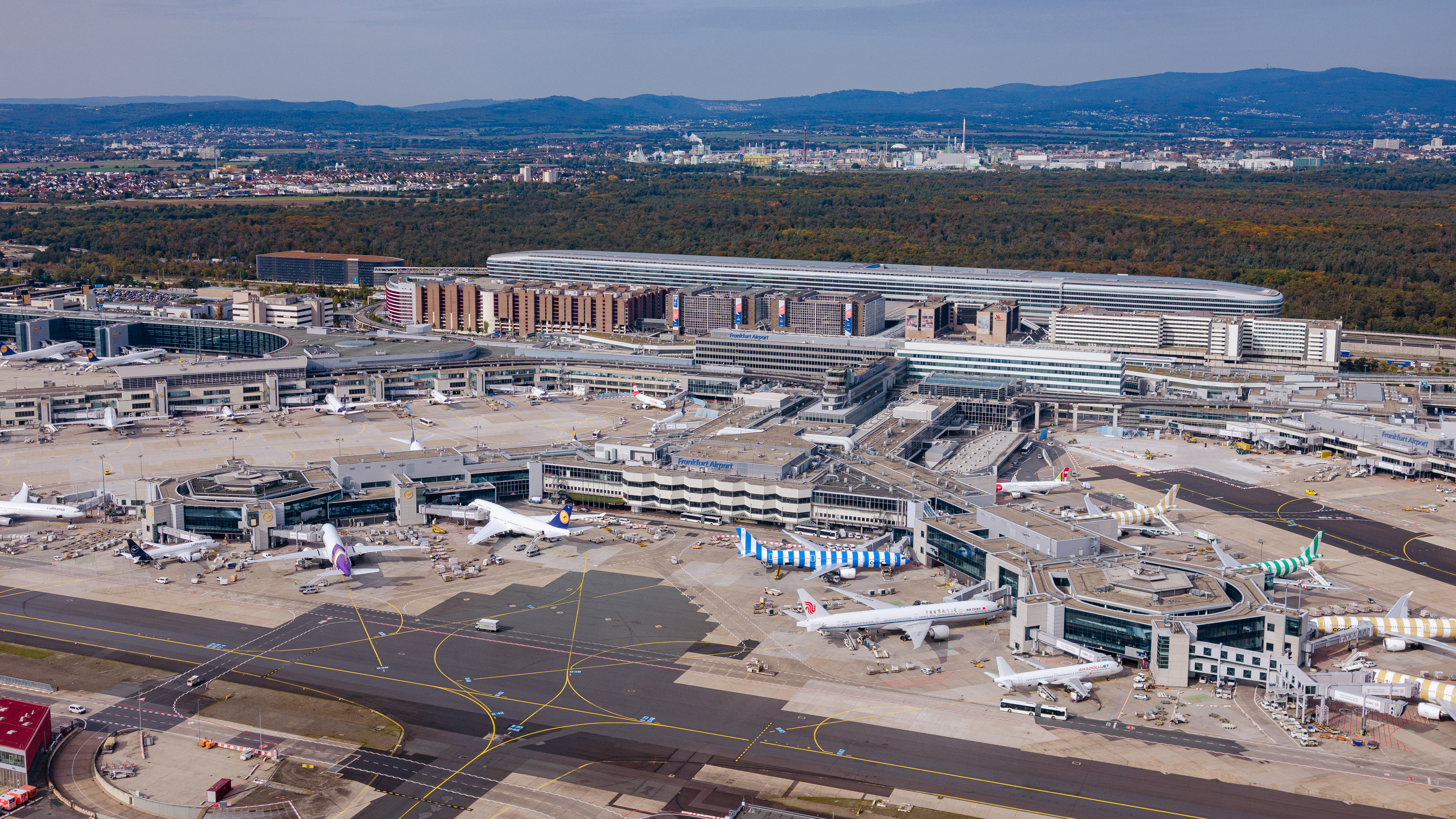
Aerial view of the central airport buildings including The Squaire in the back

Since 2012, the people mover "The Squaire Metro" connects The Squaire with the nine-storey parking structure. On a length of about 300 metres the so-called MiniMetro system with its two cabins can carry up to 1,300 passengers per hour. The constructor of the system was the Italian manufacturer Leitner Ropeways.

==== The fourth runway ====
In 2012, the website Airport Watch reported weekly protests had been occurring at the airport since the opening of a fourth runway a year previously.

==== Developments since 2011 ====
The new runway officially went into operation on 20 October 2011, with an aircraft carrying Chancellor Angela Merkel, performing the first landing on 21 October. The centre line separation from the existing north runway is about 1,400 m (4,593 ft). This allows simultaneous instrument landing system (ILS) operations on these two runways, which has not been possible on the other parallel runways, which do not meet the 3,500 feet (1,100 m) minimum separation for ILS operations. This allowed the airport to increase its capacity from 83 to 126 aircraft movements per hour.

On 11 October 2011, the Hessian Administration Court ruled that night flights between 11pm and 5am (the so-called Mediationsnacht) are no longer allowed at Frankfurt Airport after the inauguration of the new runway, and therefore overrode the approval from the Hessian government from 2007 which allowed 17 scheduled flights per night. On 4 April 2012, the German Administrative Court confirmed the decision of the Hessian Administration Court, banning night flights between 11pm and 5am.

To handle the predicted passenger amount of about 90 million in 2020, a new terminal section adjacent to Terminal 1 for an additional six million passengers opened on 10 October 2012. It is called Flugsteig A-Plus and is exclusively used by Lufthansa mainly for their long-haul flights. Flugsteig A-Plus features eight parking positions that are able to handle four Airbus A380s or seven Boeing 747-8/747–400 simultaneously.

In November 2016, Ryanair announced the opening of a new base at Frankfurt Airport with four routes to Spain and Portugal. This move by Ryanair was heavily blasted, especially by Lufthansa, as Ryanair was granted high discounts and incentives regarding the airport's fees.

==== 2011 shooting ====
Albanian citizen, Arid Uka, a 21 year old at the time, targeted a United States Air Force bus parked outside the terminal building that was supposed to transport fifteen U.S. airmen to Ramstein Air Base. He reportedly walked up to a waiting airman, asked him for a cigarette, and wanted to know whether the airmen were bound for Afghanistan. When the airman said yes, according to German prosecutor Rainer Griesbaum, Uka waited for the airman to turn away and then shot him in the back of the head, killing him. Shouting "Allahu Akbar!" the attacker then entered the bus, shooting and killing the driver, and continued to fire three shots at two other airmen, wounding them. When he pointed his pistol at the head of another airman and pulled the trigger, the weapon jammed. Uka fled, but was pursued by the civilian airport employee Lamar Joseph Conner and Staff Sergeant Trevor Donald Brewer and shortly afterwards overpowered by two German police officers. He was subsequently arrested.

==== COVID-19 pandemic ====
Portions of the airport were closed in early 2020 due to the COVID-19 pandemic. The Northwest Runway and Runway 18 West were closed on 23 March and re-purposed for parking unused aircraft. Terminal 2 was also closed, and all passenger operations were concentrated in Terminal 1. The Northwest Runway re-opened in July to handle summer tourist demand, while Runway 18 West remained closed. With almost no passenger traffic in the spring months, Frankfurt's total passenger volume in 2020 fell to 18.8 million, the lowest figure recorded since 1984.

==== Later ====
In 2023, an outbreak of malaria broke out at the airport. It was followed by another outbreak in 2026 that sickened 6 employees, of which two died.

== Terminals ==
=== Overview ===
Frankfurt Airport features two large main passenger terminals (Terminals 1 and 2), with Terminal 3 open since 22 April 2026 and operating since 23 April 2026, as well as a much smaller dedicated First Class Terminal which is operated and exclusively used by Lufthansa. As is the case at London–Heathrow, Tokyo–Narita and other major airports, terminal operations are grouped for airlines and airline alliances rather than into domestic and international routes. However, there are dedicated sections for Schengen and non-Schengen routes.

Terminal	Concourse	Schengen gates	Non-Schengen gates	Location
1	1A	A1-A42, A50-A69		Terminal 1, Western Concourse, lower departure level
1	1Z		Z11-Z25, Z50-Z69	Terminal 1, Western Concourse, upper departure level
1	1B	B1-B19 (inner area)	B20-B63 (outer area)	Terminal 1, central concourse
1	1C	C1	C2-C20	Terminal 1, eastern concourse
2	2D	D21-D44 (lower departure level)	D1-D20/D50-D54 (upper departure level)	Terminal 2, western concourse
2	2E	E21-E26 (lower departure level)	E2-E13 (upper departure level)	Terminal 2, eastern concourse
3	3H			
3	3J			

=== Terminal 1 ===
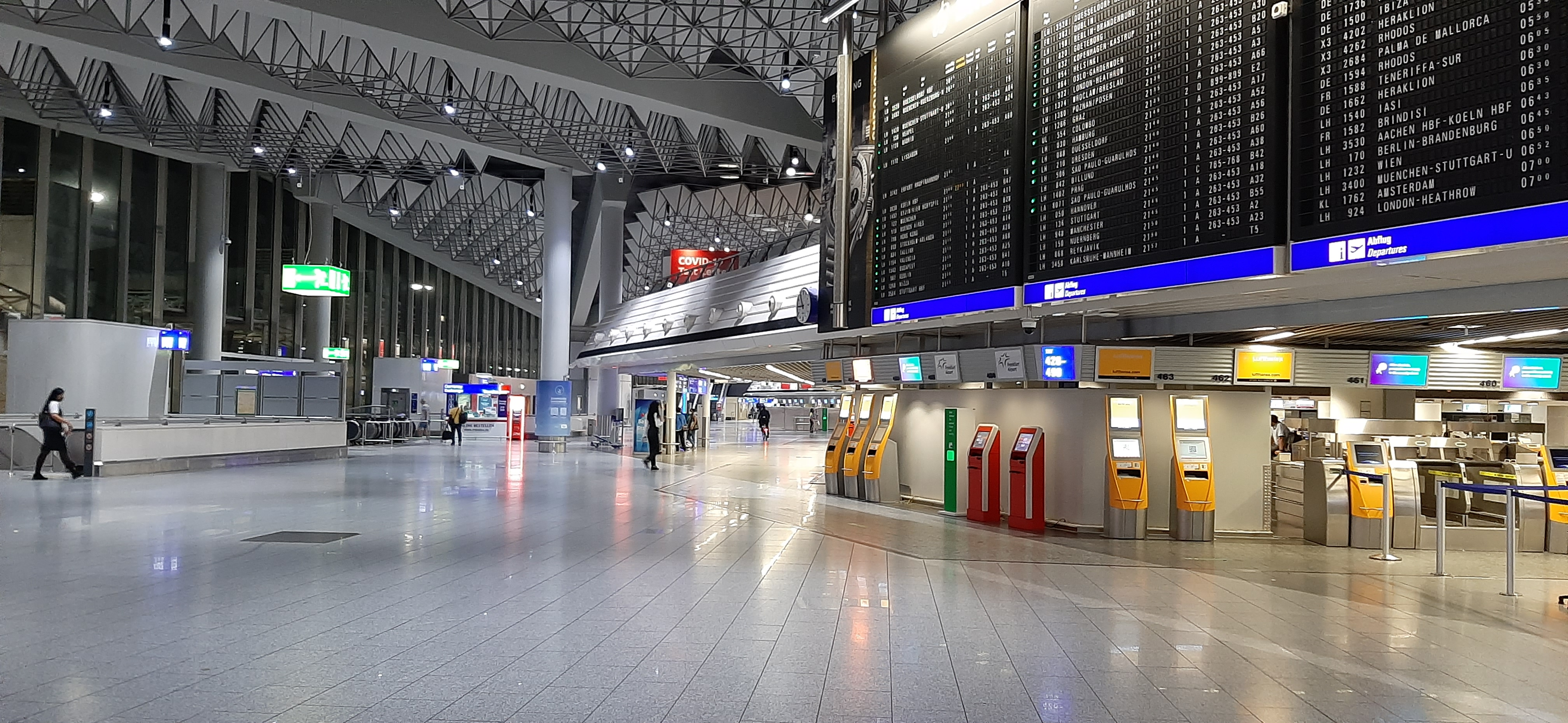
Check-in concourse in Terminal 1

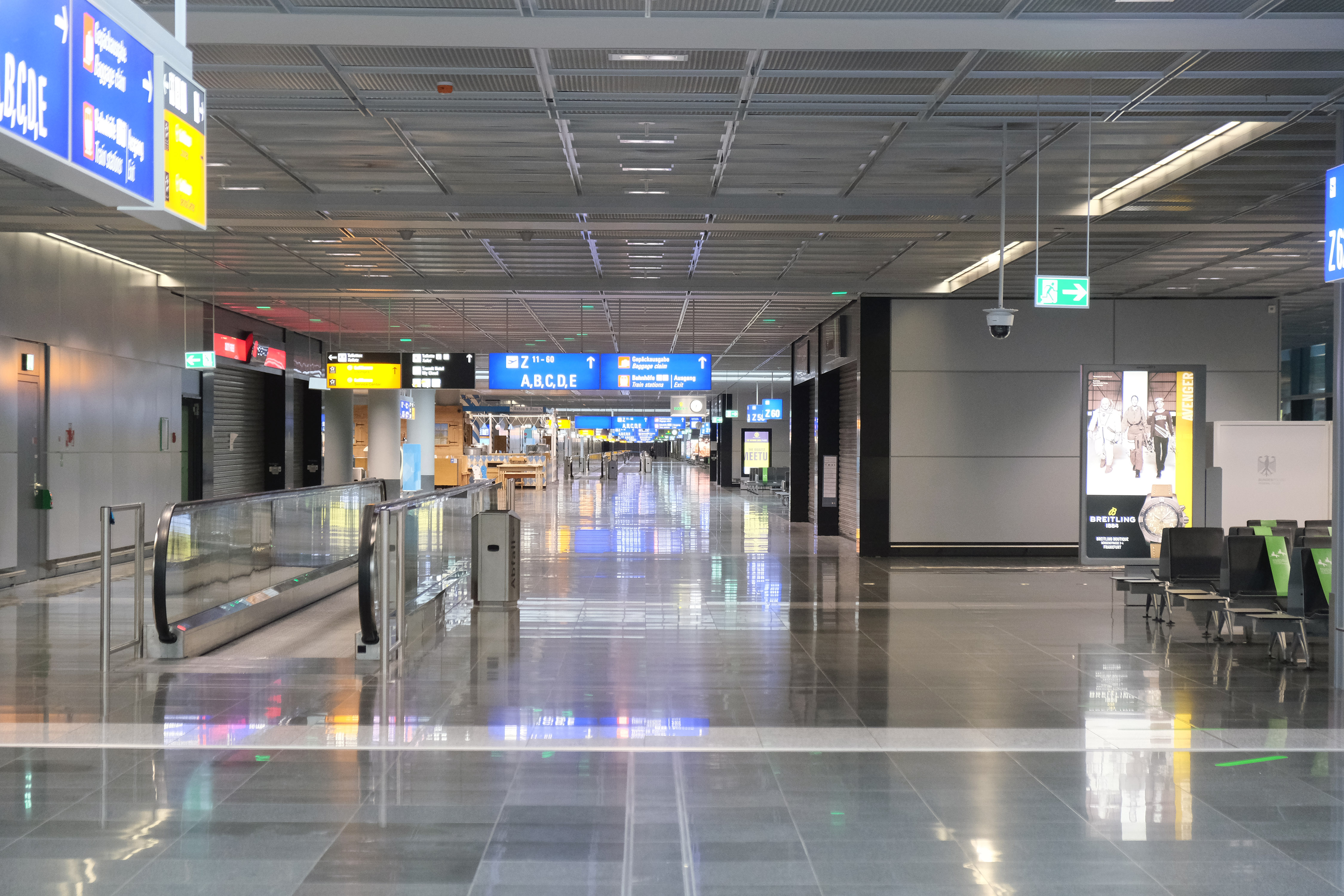
Airside area inside Terminal 1

Terminal 1 opened on 14 March 1972 as Terminal Mitte, and is the oldest and largest of the three passenger terminals. The landside is 420 metres long. It has been enlarged several times, is divided into concourses A, B, C and Z and has a capacity of approximately 50 million passengers per year. Terminal 1 is functionally divided into three levels, the departures level on the upper floor with check-in counters, the arrivals level with baggage claim areas on the ground floor and, underneath, a distribution floor with access to the regional station and underground and multilevel parking. Departures and arrivals levels each have separate street approaches. A bus station is located at the arrivals level. Terminal 1 has a total of 103 gates, which include 54 gates equipped with jetways (25 in Concourse A, 18 in Concourse B, 11 in Concourse C). Concourse Z sits on top of Concourse A sharing the same jet bridges between both concourses. Flights to non-Schengen destinations depart from the Z gates and Schengen flights depart from the A gates.

Pier A was extended by 500 metres in 2000, and a link between Terminal 1 and Terminal 2, as well as the Hall C extension opened in 2008.

On 10 October 2012, an 800-metre-long westward expansion of Terminal 1 called Pier A-Plus went into operation. It provides more stands for wide-body aircraft like the Airbus A380.

Terminal 1 is primarily used by the Lufthansa Group and its Star Alliance partners, amongst them Air Canada, All Nippon Airways, Ethiopian Airlines and United Airlines. Some airlines that are not part of the Lufthansa Group or Star Alliance however also use Terminal 1, of which the largest is Condor (a former Lufthansa subsidiary). Since the secure gates for flights to Israel are located in Concourse C, Israeli flag carrier El Al also uses Terminal 1.

Condor has since announced that they will relocate to Terminal 3 in the Summer of 2027.

=== Terminal 2 ===
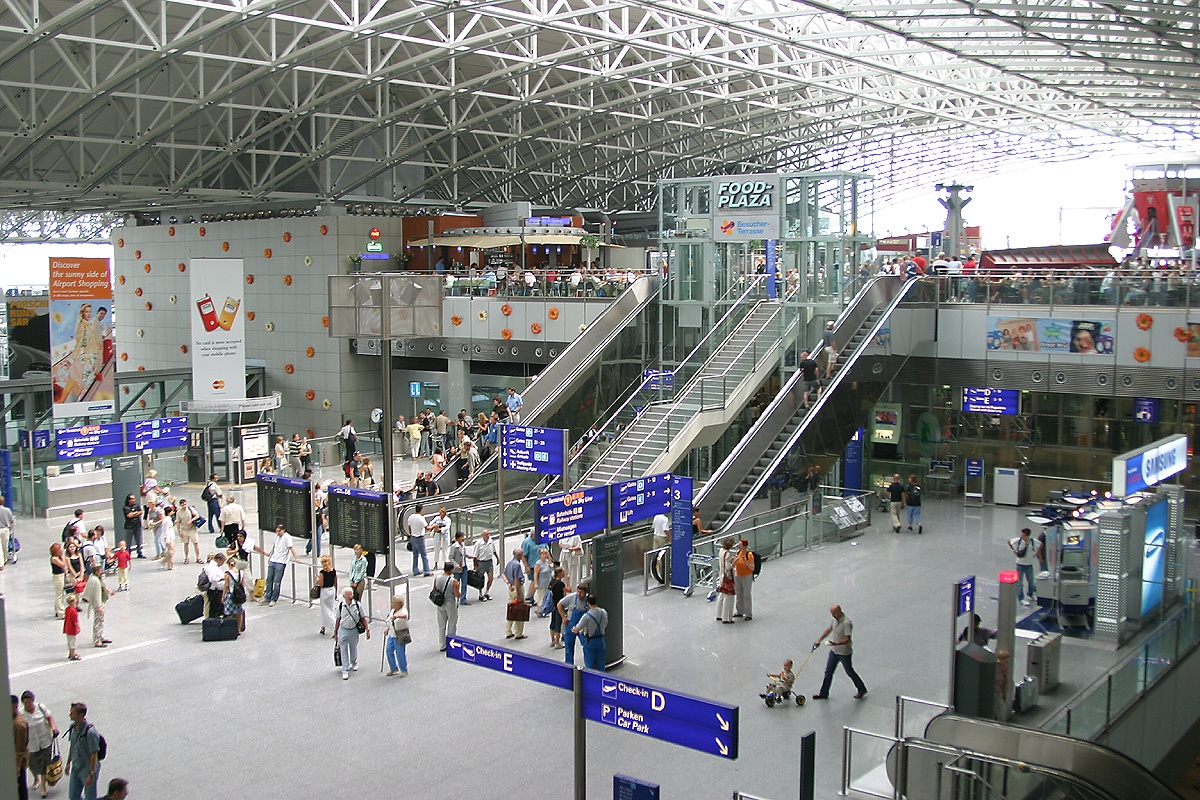
Landside main hall of Terminal 2

Terminal 2, which has a capacity of 15 million passengers a year, was opened in 1994 and is divided into concourses D and E. A continuous concourse between Terminal 1C and 2D provides direct but non-public access between the two terminals. It has eight gates with jetways and 34 apron stands, a total of 42 gates and is able to handle wide-body aircraft such as the Airbus A380.

Fraport announced in late 2022 that Terminal 2 will be temporarily closed for refurbishment starting in 2026. All airlines that once occupied Terminal 2 have relocated to Terminal 3 after it opened April 23, 2026. Terminal 2 closed on June 9, 2026 with operations to resume in the mid-2030s.

=== Terminal 3 ===
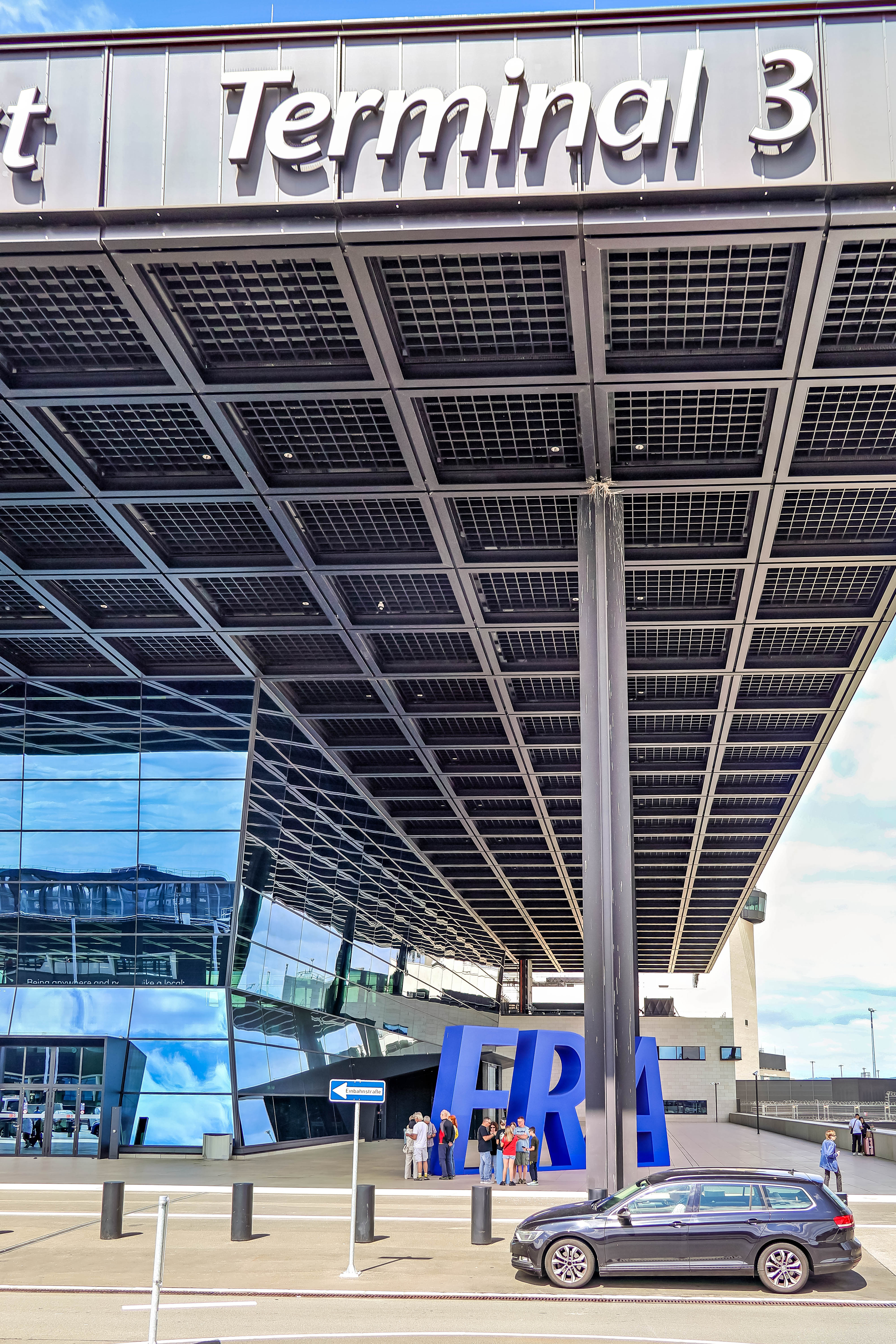
Exterior of Terminal 3 (2026)

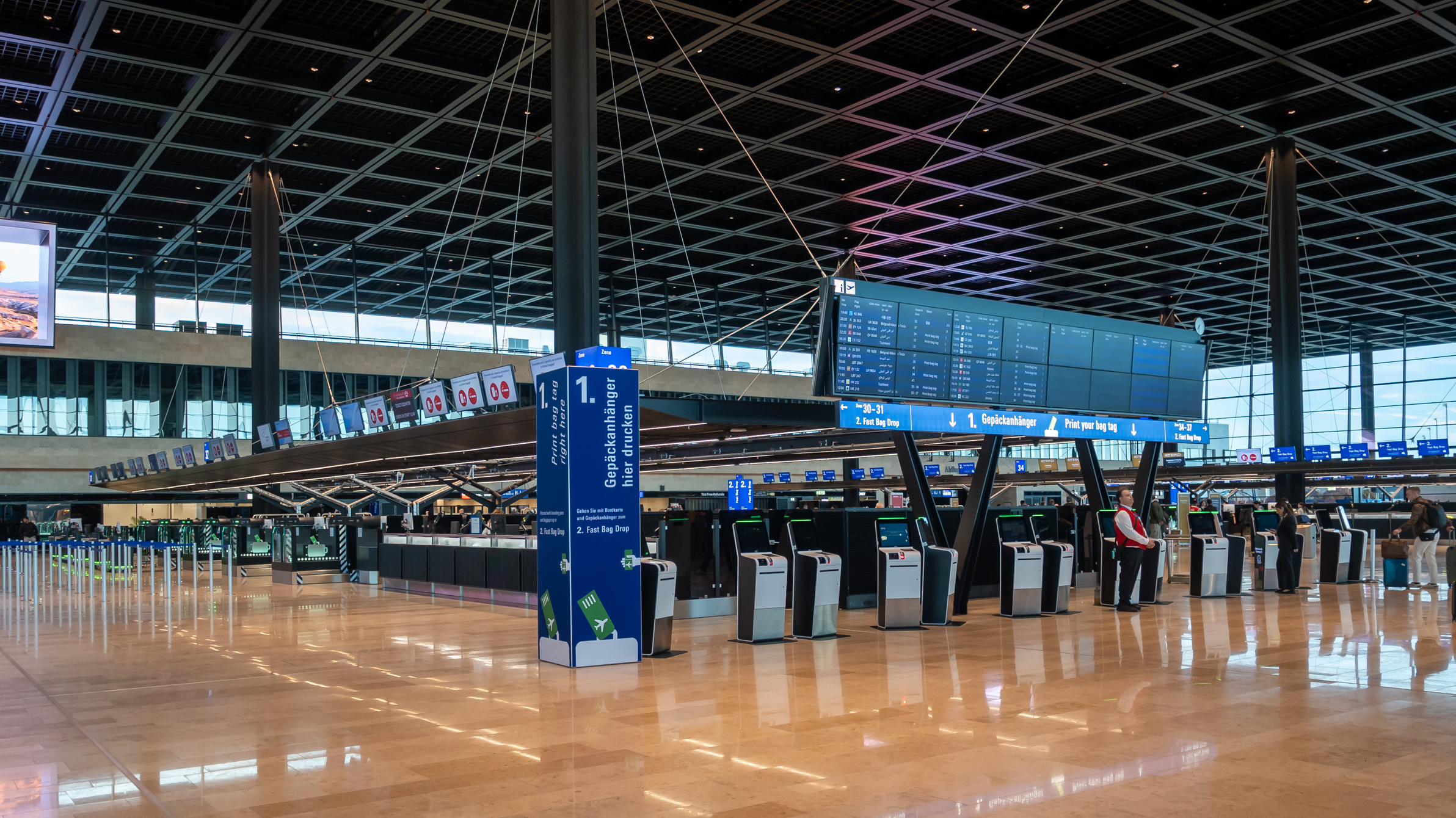
Check-In area of Terminal 3

In 2009, the German government decided to create third terminals for both Frankfurt Airport and Munich Airport in order to handle expected passenger flows of 90 million in Frankfurt by 2020 and 50 million in Munich by 2017. The new terminal is scheduled to be built by Fraport, south of the existing terminals on the grounds of the former Rhein-Main Air Base. The new Terminal 3 is to accommodate up to 25 million passengers and will feature 75 new aircraft positions when completely constructed. An extension of the SkyLine people mover system is planned to connect the new terminal to Terminals 1 and 2 and the airport railway stations.

In August 2014, the city of Frankfurt granted building permission for the first phase of Terminal 3. The groundbreaking for the new terminal took place on 5 October 2015. Its first phase, consisting of the main building and two of the planned four piers (concourses 3H and 3J), open in 2026 and can handle 15 million additional passengers per year. Total cost was estimated at 3 billion euros.

After delays caused by the COVID-19 pandemic, all 56 airlines using Terminal 2 moved to Terminal 3 in four phases.

- On April 23, 2026 Terminal 3 officially opened and the first slate of 13 airlines moved from Terminal 2 to Terminal 3, including oneworld members Cathay Pacific, Oman Air, and Qatar Airways, SkyTeam members China Airlines, China Eastern Airlines, Korean Air, and Saudia, as well as unaffiliated China Southern Airlines, Emirates, Etihad Airways, Gulf Air, Kuwait Airways, and T'Way Air.
- On May 5, 2026, the second slate of 18 airlines moved from Terminal 2 to Terminal 3, including oneworld members Royal Air Maroc and Royal Jordanian Airlines, SkyTeam member Middle East Airlines, as well as unaffiliated Air Algerie, Air Astana, Air Cairo, Air Montenegro, Air Serbia, Centrum Air, FlyErbil, Nesma Airlines, Nouvelair, Plus Ultra, Qanot Sharq, SkyUp Airlines, Tunisair, Turkmenistan Airlines, and Uzbekistan Airways.
- On May 19, 2026, the third slate of 12 airlines moved from Terminal 2 to Terminal 3, including oneworld members American Airlines, British Airways, Japan Airlines, and SriLankan Airlines, SkyTeam members Delta Air Lines and Vietnam Airlines, as well as unaffiliated Aer Lingus, Freebird Airlines, HiSky, MIAT Mongolian Airlines, Pegasus Airlines, and TUI fly.
- On June 9, 2026, the fourth slate of 13 airlines moved from Terminal 2 to Terminal 3, including oneworld members Finnair and Iberia, SkyTeam members Air Europa, Air France, KLM, SAS, and TAROM, as well as unaffiliated Bulgaria Air, easyJet, FlyOne, Icelandair, SATA Air, and SKY express.

== Runways ==
Frankfurt Airport has four runways of which three are arranged parallel in an east–west direction and one in a north–south direction. In 2010 three runways (Runways North, South and West) handled 464,432 aircraft movements, which equated to 83 movements per hour. With the start of operation of the Northwest Runway in October 2011 the airport was predicted to be able to handle 126 movements per hour.

During normal operation, the two outer parallel runways (07L/25R and 07R/25L) are used for landings and the central parallel runway (07C/25C) and the Runway West (18) for take-offs. The three parallel runways have two markings because they can be operated in two directions while the Runway West can only be used in one direction.

Direction (name)	Length × width in m (ft)	Surface	Orientation	Inauguration	Usage
07C/25C (Runway North)	4000 × 60 (13,123 × 197)	Asphalt	East-west	1936	Take-offs and landings
07R/25L (Runway South)	4000 × 45 (13,123 × 148)	Asphalt	East-west	1949	Take-offs and landings
18 (Runway West)	4000 × 45 (13,123 × 148)	Concrete	North-south	1984	Southbound take-offs only
07L/25R (Runway Northwest)	2800 × 45 (9,240 × 148)	Concrete	East-west	2011	Landings only (not certified for Airbus A380, Boeing 747 and MD-11)

== Airlines and destinations ==
=== Passenger ===
Lufthansa and their Star Alliance partners account for the majority of all traffic at Frankfurt Airport. The following airlines offer year-round and seasonal scheduled and charter flights at Frankfurt Airport:

Airlines	Destinations
Aegean Airlines	Athens, Thessaloniki; Seasonal: Heraklion
Aer Lingus	Dublin
Air Algérie	Algiers
Air Arabia	Sharjah (begins 15 December 2026)
Air Astana	Almaty, Astana, Oral
Air Cairo	Hurghada, Sharm El Sheikh, Marsa Alam
Air Canada	Montréal–Trudeau, Toronto–Pearson; Seasonal: Vancouver
Air China	Beijing–Capital, Beijing–Daxing, Chengdu–Tianfu, Shanghai–Pudong, Shenzhen
Air Dolomiti	Amsterdam, Basel/Mulhouse, Billund, Birmingham, Bordeaux, Florence, Graz, London–City, Luxembourg, Lyon, Milan–Linate, Milan–Malpensa, Prague, Trieste, Turin, Verona, Wrocław, Zurich; Seasonal: Biarritz, Bologna, Figari, Innsbruck, Pisa
Air Europa	Madrid
Air France	Paris–Charles de Gaulle
Air India	Delhi–Indira Gandhi, Mumbai–Shivaji
Air Montenegro	Podgorica
Air Serbia	Belgrade
airBaltic	Riga
AJet	Ankara, Istanbul–Sabiha Gökçen; Seasonal: Antalya, Dalaman (begins 26 April 2027), Milas/Bodrum (begins 5 July 2027)
All Nippon Airways	Tokyo–Haneda
American Airlines	Charlotte, Dallas/Fort Worth
Asiana Airlines	Seoul–Incheon (ends 17 December 2026)
Austrian Airlines	Vienna
Azores Airlines	Ponta Delgada
British Airways	London–Heathrow
Brussels Airlines	Brussels
Bulgaria Air	Sofia; Seasonal: Varna
Cathay Pacific	Hong Kong
Centrum Air	Tashkent
China Airlines	Taipei–Taoyuan
China Eastern Airlines	Shanghai–Pudong
China Southern Airlines	Guangzhou, Shenyang, Ürümqi
Condor	Abu Dhabi, Bangkok–Suvarnabhumi, Barbados, Barcelona, Berlin, Budapest, Cairo, Cancún, Fuerteventura, Funchal, Gran Canaria, Hamburg, Hurghada, Johannesburg–O. R. Tambo, Lanzarote, London–Gatwick, Los Angeles, Mauritius, Milan–Malpensa, Montego Bay, Munich, New York–JFK,Paris–Charles de Gaulle, Prague, Puerto Plata, (Note: Condor's flight from Puerto Plata to Frankfurt operates via Santo Domingo; however, the flight from Frankfurt to Puerto Plata is nonstop.) Punta Cana, Sanya, Seattle/Tacoma, Stockholm–Arlanda (begins 13 May 2027), Tbilisi, Tel Aviv, Tenerife–South, Toronto–Pearson, Vienna, Zurich; Seasonal: Agadir, Anchorage, Antalya, Antigua, Athens (begins 28 April 2027), Boston, Calgary, Cape Town, Chania, Chicago–O'Hare (begins 14 May 2027), Corfu, Faro, Florence (begins 6 May 2027), Giza, Grenada, Heraklion, Ibiza, Jerez de la Frontera, Kalamata, Kavala, Kos, Lamezia Terme, La Palma, Larnaca, Las Vegas, Mahé, Málaga, Malé, Mombasa, Olbia, Palma de Mallorca, Phuket, Portland (OR), Preveza/Lefkada, Rhodes, Rome–Fiumicino, Samos, San Francisco, San José del Cabo, Split, Tobago, Vancouver, Venice, Yerevan, Zakynthos, Zanzibar; Seasonal charter: Denpasar
Corendon Airlines	Seasonal: Antalya, İzmir
Croatia Airlines	Dubrovnik, Split, Zagreb
Cubana de Aviación	Havana, Holguin
DAT	Linz
Delta Air Lines	Atlanta, Detroit, New York–JFK
Discover Airlines	Bari, Calgary, Fort Myers, Funchal, Glasgow (begins 29 March 2027), Gran Canaria, Harstad/Narvik, Heraklion, Lanzarote, Larnaca, Las Vegas, Mahé, Marrakesh, Mombasa, Orlando, Palma de Mallorca, Philadelphia, Punta Cana, San José (CR) (begins 14 December 2027), Seattle/Tacoma (begins 28 March 2027), Split, Tampa, Tenerife–South, Windhoek–Hosea Kutako, Varna Seasonal: Agadir, Alta, Belize City (begins 16 December 2027), Bodø, Bristol (begins 17 May 2027), Brindisi, Burgas, Cancún, Chania, Corfu, Djerba, Dubrovnik, Edmonton (begins 1 June 2027), Fuerteventura, Genoa (begins 28 March 2027), Halifax, Hurghada, Ibiza, Inverness (begins 19 June 2027), Jerez de la Frontera, Kalamata, Kefalonia, Kittilä, Kos, La Palma, Lanzarote, Male, Mauritius, Menorca, Minneapolis/Saint Paul, Monastir, Mykonos, Rhodes, Santorini, Savonlinna (begins 19 June 2027), Shannon, Skiathos, Victoria Falls, Zadar, Zakynthos, Zanzibar; Seasonal charter: La Romana
easyJet	Milan–Linate, Rome–Fiumicino
EgyptAir	Cairo
El Al	Tel Aviv
Emirates	Dubai–International
Ethiopian Airlines	Addis Ababa
Etihad Airways	Abu Dhabi
Eurowings	Pristina
Finnair	Helsinki
FlyErbil	Erbil
FlyOne	Bucharest–Otopeni
Gulf Air	Bahrain
HiSky	Bucharest–Otopeni, Chișinău
Iberia	Madrid
Icelandair	Reykjavík–Keflavík
Iraqi Airways	Baghdad, Erbil, Sulaymaniyah
ITA Airways	Rome–Fiumicino
Japan Airlines	Tokyo–Narita
KLM	Amsterdam
Korean Air	Seoul–Incheon
Kuwait Airways	Kuwait City
LATAM Brasil	São Paulo–Guarulhos
LOT Polish Airlines	Warsaw–Chopin
LEAV Aviation	Seasonal: Antalya, Palma de Mallorca
Lufthansa	Abuja, Algiers, Alicante, Almaty, Amman–Queen Alia, Amsterdam, Astana, Athens, Atlanta, Austin, Baku, Barcelona, Basel/Mulhouse, Beirut, Belgrade, Bengaluru, Bergen, Berlin, Bilbao, Billund, Birmingham, Bogotá, Bologna, Bordeaux, Boston, Bremen, Brussels, Bucharest–Otopeni, Budapest, Buenos Aires–Ezeiza, Bydgoszcz, Cairo, Cape Town, Casablanca, Catania, Chennai, Chicago–O'Hare, Chișinău, Columbus–Glenn (begins 5 May 2027), Copenhagen, Dallas/Fort Worth, Dammam, Delhi–Indira Gandhi, Denver, Detroit, Dresden, Dubai–International, Dublin, Düsseldorf, Edinburgh, Erbil, Faro, Funchal, Gdańsk, Glasgow, Gothenburg, Graz, Hamburg, Hanover, Helsinki, Hong Kong, Houston–Intercontinental, Hyderabad, Istanbul, Johannesburg–O. R. Tambo, Katowice, Kraków, Kuala Lumpur–International, Lagos, Leipzig/Halle, Lisbon, Ljubljana, London–Heathrow, Los Angeles, Luanda–Agostinho Neto, Luxembourg, Lyon, Madrid, Malabo, Málaga, Malta, Manchester, Marseille, Mexico City–Benito Juárez, Miami, Milan–Linate, Milan–Malpensa, Mumbai–Shivaji, Munich, Nairobi–Jomo Kenyatta, Nantes, Naples, Newcastle upon Tyne, New York–JFK, Newark, Nice, Nuremberg, Oslo, Palermo, Palma de Mallorca, Paris–Charles de Gaulle, Port Harcourt, Porto, Poznań, Prague, Raleigh/Durham, Reykjavík–Keflavík, Riga, Rio de Janeiro–Galeão, Riyadh, Rome–Fiumicino, Rzeszów, Salzburg, San Francisco, San José (CR) (ends 14 December 2027), São Paulo–Guarulhos, Sarajevo, Seattle/Tacoma, Seoul–Incheon, Seville, Shanghai–Pudong, Singapore, Sofia, St. Louis, Stavanger, Stockholm–Arlanda, Strasbourg, Stuttgart, Sylt, Tallinn, Tehran–Imam Khomeini, Tel Aviv, Thessaloniki, Tirana, Tokyo–Haneda, Tokyo–Narita (resumes 28 March 2027), Toronto–Pearson, Tunis, Valencia, Vancouver, Venice, Vienna, Vilnius, Warsaw–Chopin, Washington–Dulles, Wrocław, Yerevan, Zagreb, Zurich; Seasonal: Asturias, Bastia, Biarritz, Cagliari, Cork, Heraklion, Heringsdorf, Ibiza, Ivalo, Kos, Kuusamo, Lamezia Terme, Montréal–Trudeau, Nagoya-Centrair (resumes 29 March 2027), Olbia, Ponta Delgada, Pula, Rijeka, Rovaniemi, Santiago de Compostela, Tivat, Tromsø, Trondheim
MIAT Mongolian Airlines	Ulaanbaatar
Middle East Airlines	Beirut
Nouvelair	Djerba, Monastir, Tunis
Oman Air	Muscat
Pegasus Airlines	Ankara, Antalya, Istanbul–Sabiha Gökçen; Seasonal: İzmir
Qatar Airways	Doha
Royal Air Maroc	Casablanca, Nador
Royal Jordanian	Amman–Queen Alia
Saudia	Jeddah, Riyadh
Scandinavian Airlines	Copenhagen
Singapore Airlines	New York–JFK, Singapore
Sky Express	Athens
SriLankan Airlines	Colombo–Bandaranaike
SunExpress	Adana/Mersin, Ankara, Antalya, Dalaman, Gaziantep, İzmir; Seasonal: Bodrum, Diyarbakır, Malatya, Samsun
Swiss International Air Lines	Geneva, Zurich
TAP Air Portugal	Lisbon
TAROM	Bucharest–Otopeni
Thai Airways International	Bangkok–Suvarnabhumi
TUI fly Deutschland	Boa Vista, Fuerteventura, Gran Canaria, Hurghada, Lanzarote, Marsa Alam, Sal, Tenerife–North, Tenerife–South; Seasonal: Corfu, Dalaman, Faro, Funchal, Heraklion, Jerez de la Frontera, Kos, Larnaca, Menorca, Palma de Mallorca, Patras, Rhodes
Tunisair	Djerba, Tunis
Turkish Airlines	Istanbul
Turkmenistan Airlines	Ashgabat
United Airlines	Chicago–O' Hare, Denver, Houston–Intercontinental, Newark, San Francisco, Washington–Dulles
Uzbekistan Airways	Tashkent
Vietnam Airlines	Hanoi, Ho Chi Minh City

=== Cargo ===
Airlines	Destinations
AeroLogic	Atlanta, Bahrain, New York–JFK, Osaka–Kansai, Singapore, Taipei–Taoyuan
Air Canada Cargo	Toronto–Pearson
Air China Cargo	Beijing–Capital, Chicago–O'Hare, Shanghai–Pudong
AirZeta	Almaty, London–Stansted, Seoul–Incheon
ANA Cargo	Tokyo–Narita
Cathay Cargo	Delhi–Indira Gandhi, Hong Kong
China Airlines Cargo	Taipei–Taoyuan
China Cargo Airlines	Shanghai–Pudong
China Southern Cargo	Guangzhou, Shenzhen
El Al Cargo	Lublin, Tel Aviv
Emirates SkyCargo	Dubai–Al Maktoum, Dubai–International, Maastricht/Aachen, Mexico City–Benito Juárez
Etihad Cargo	Abu Dhabi, Chicago–O'Hare, Ezhou
FedEx Express	Memphis, Paris–Charles de Gaulle
Korean Air Cargo	London–Heathrow, Seoul–Incheon, Tel Aviv, Vienna
LATAM Cargo Brasil	São Paulo–Guarulhos
LATAM Cargo Chile	Campinas
Lufthansa Cargo	Aguadilla, Almaty, Amsterdam, Atlanta, Bahrain, Bangkok–Suvarnabhumi, Beijing–Capital, Bengaluru, Birmingham, Bogotá, Boston, Buenos Aires–Ezeiza, Cairo, Campinas, Casablanca, Chengdu–Tianfu, Chennai, Chicago–O'Hare, Chongqing, Cologne/Bonn, Curitiba, Dakar–Diass, Dallas/Fort Worth, Delhi–Indira Gandhi, Dhaka, Dublin, Guadalajara, Guangzhou, Hong Kong, Houston–Intercontinental, Hyderabad, Istanbul, Jakarta–Soekarno-Hatta, Jeddah, Johannesburg–O. R. Tambo, Katowice, Kaunas, Larnaca, London–Heathrow, Los Angeles, Madrid, Manila, Manaus, Mexico City–Benito Juárez, Mexico City–Felipe Ángeles, Miami, Mumbai–Shivaji, Nairobi–Jomo Kenyatta, New York–JFK, Novosibirsk, Osaka–Kansai, Quito, Rio de Janeiro–Galeão, Riyadh, Seoul–Incheon, Shanghai–Pudong, Shannon, Sharjah, Shenyang, Shenzhen, Taipei–Taoyuan, Tehran–Imam Khomeini, Tel Aviv, Tokyo–Narita, Toronto–Pearson, Yerevan
Nippon Cargo Airlines	Tokyo–Narita
Royal Air Maroc Cargo	Casablanca
Saudia Cargo	Dammam, Riyadh
SF Airlines	Wuhan
Turkish Cargo	Istanbul

== Other facilities ==
=== CargoCity ===
Frankfurt Airport is the second-largest multimodal transport airport in Europe and has several logistics facilities. These facilities are grouped at two areas

- The 98-hectare CargoCity Süd (South) is home to a cargo centre for dispatch service providers and freight forwarding businesses. Several transport companies like DHL Global Forwarding, Air China, LUG Aircargo Handling (Emirates, Japan Airlines, Korean Air, Cargolux Airlines, Aegean Airlines, Delta Air Lines, Siberian Airlines, South African Airways, Uzbekistan Airways) and Fraport Cargo Services are based here.
- CargoCity Nord (North) is the headquarters of Lufthansa Cargo. Additional facilities here are a Perishables Centre for fresh produced goods and the Frankfurt Animal Lounge for the transport of living animals.

=== Airport City ===
The airport ground and the surrounding area of Frankfurt Airport offer a large variety of on-airport businesses as well as airport-related businesses, including office space, hotels, shopping areas, conference rooms and car parks. The development of an airport city has significantly accelerated in recent years.

==== Frankfurt Airport Centres ====
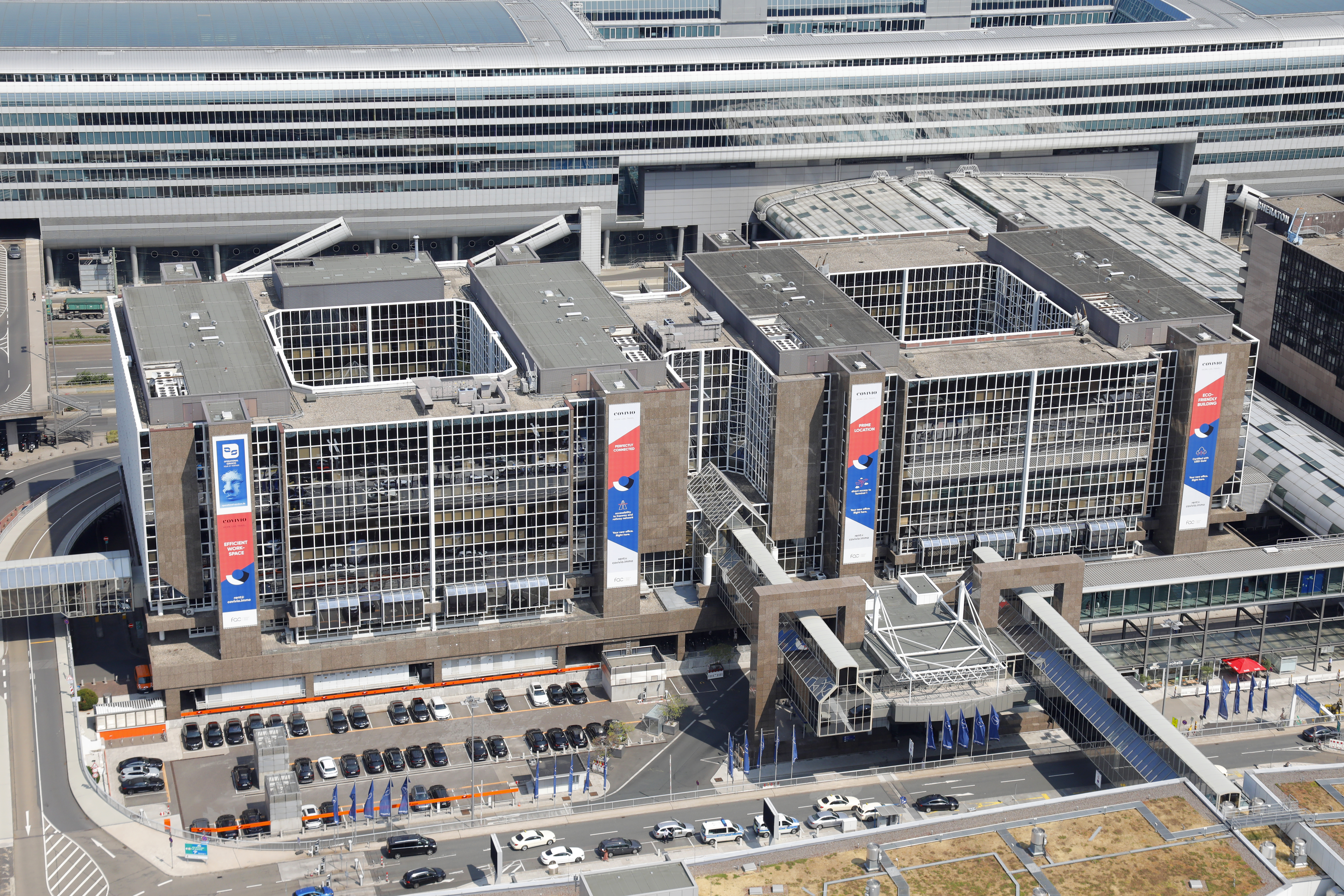
Frankfurt Airport Centre

The Frankfurt Airport Centre 1 (FAC 1) near Terminal 1 offers office and conference facilities, the newer FAC 2 is located within Terminal 2 and offers office space for airlines. FAC Building 234 accommodates the head office of Discover Airlines, previously named Eurowings Discover.

==== Airport City Mall ====
The Airport City Mall is located on the landside of Terminal 1, departure hall B. It offers national and international retailers and label stores, a supermarket and several restaurants.

==== The Squaire ====
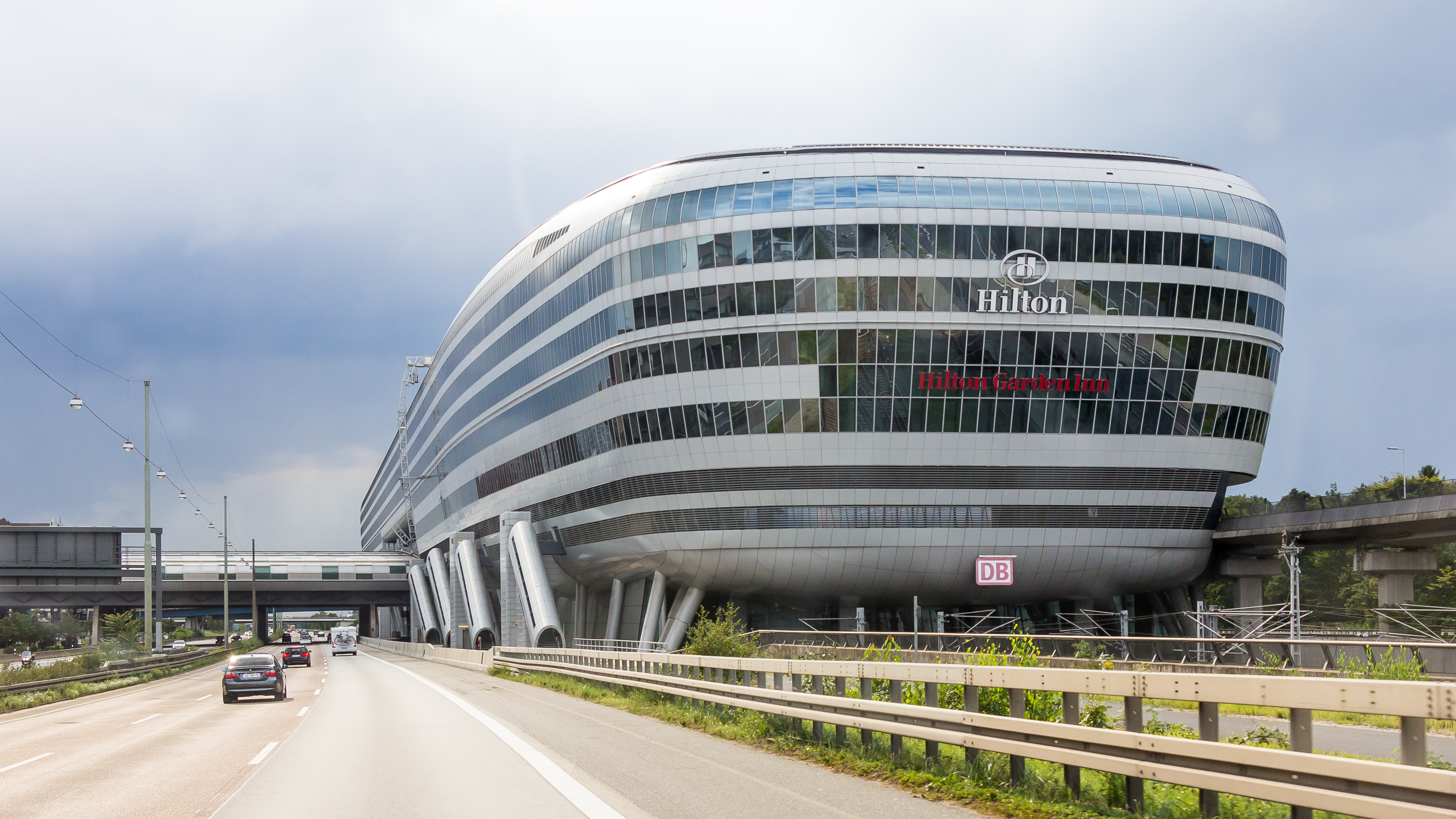
The Squaire

The Squaire is an office and retail building with a total floor area of 140,000 m^{2} (1,506,900 sq ft). It is directly connected to Terminal 1 through a connecting corridor for pedestrians. The accounting firm KPMG, Lufthansa and two Hilton Hotels (Hilton Garden Inn Frankfurt Airport with 334 rooms and Hilton Frankfurt Airport with 249 rooms) occupy space in The Squaire.

==== Main Airport Centre ====
The Main Airport Centre, named after the Main river, is an office building with ten floors and about 51,000 m^{2} (549,000 sq ft) of office space. It is located at the edge of the Frankfurt City Forest near Terminal 2.

==== Sheraton Hotel & Conference Centre ====
Sheraton Hotels and Resorts offers 1,008 guest rooms adjacent to Terminal 1 and a conference centre for up to 200 delegates.

==== Gateway Gardens ====
Gateway Gardens is a former housing area for the US Air Force personnel based at the Rhein-Main Air Base, close to Terminal 2. Like the air base, the housing area was closed in 2005. Since then the area is being developed into a business location for airport-related companies. Lufthansa moved its airline catering subsidiary LSG Sky Chefs to Gateway Gardens, Condor and SunExpress are headquartered here. DB Schenker, the logistics company of Deutsche Bahn, have built a 66 m (217 ft) high-rise building.

In December 2019, local trains were re-routed to run via Gateway Gardens station. The new stop for S-Bahn trains is located between Frankfurt Airport Regional Station and Frankfurt-Stadion station. The journey time will increase by 4 minutes but Deutsche Bahn have stated that they will use new trains (ET423) which will be faster and have more capacity.

=== Further users ===
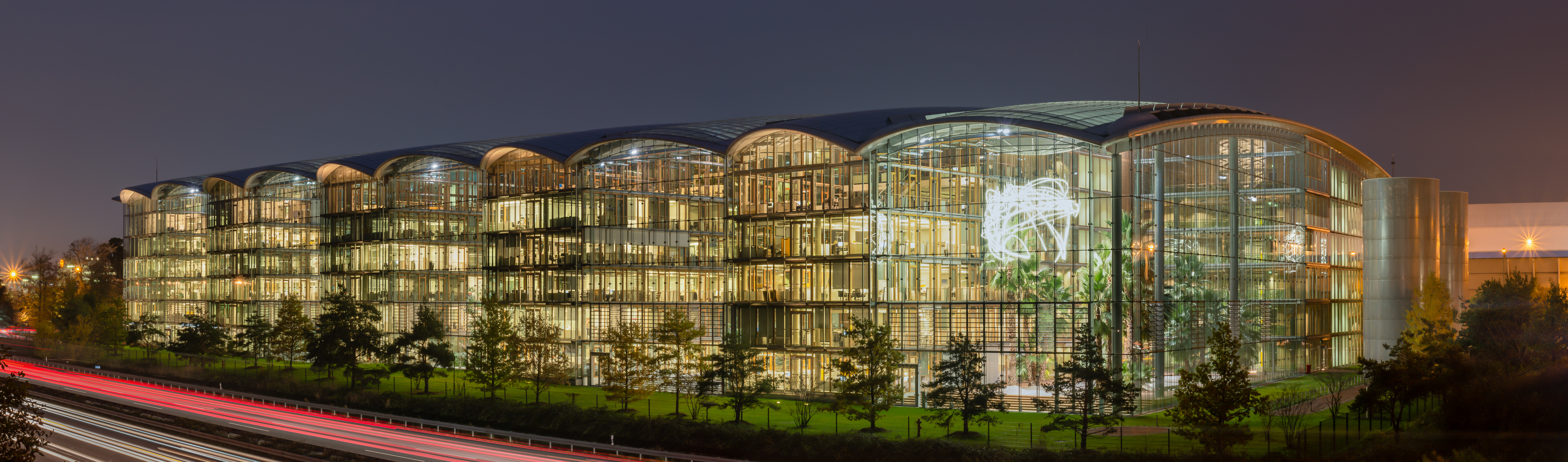
Lufthansa Aviation Centre

- Fraport's facilities are on the property of Frankfurt Airport. Its head office building is by Gate 3. The newly constructed headquarters were inaugurated there in 2012. The Fraport Driving School (Fraport Fahrschule) is in Building 501 of CargoCity South (CargoCity Süd).
- Lufthansa's corporate headquarters, where the board of directors is seated, is the Lufthansa Aviation Centre (LAC), Building 366 at Frankfurt Airport. Several company departments, including Corporate Communications, Investor Relations, and Media Relations, are based at the LAC. Lufthansa also uses several other buildings in the area, including the Lufthansa Flight Training Center for flight training operations and the Lufthansa Basis BG2 as a central base and for crew briefing. As of 2011 Lufthansa Cargo has been headquartered in Building 451 of the Frankfurt Airport area. As of 2012 Lufthansa Cargo is located at Gate 25 in the CargoCity Nord area, Lufthansa Technik is located at Gate 23 and in the CargoCity Süd area.
- Airmail Centre Frankfurt, a joint venture of Lufthansa Cargo, Fraport, and Deutsche Post for airmail transport, has its head office in Building 189, between Terminals 1 and 2.
- Now defunct German leisure airline Aero Lloyd had its head office in Building 182.
- The Star Alliance also had its headquarters at the Frankfurt Airport Centre 1 until its relocation to Singapore in 2023.

== Statistics ==
=== Annual traffic ===
Annual passenger traffic
Year	Passengers	% change
2000	49,360,620	Steady
2001	48,559,980	▼ -1.6%
2002	48,450,356	▼ -0.2%
2003	48,351,664	▼ -0.2%
2004	51,098,271	▲5.6%
2005	52,219,412	▲2.2%
2006	52,810,683	▲1.1%
2007	54,161,856	▲2.5%
2008	53,467,450	▼ -1.3%
2009	50,932,840	▼ -4.3%
2010	53,009,221	▲4%
2011	56,436,255	▲6.4%
2012	57,520,001	▲2%
2013	58,036,948	▲1%
2014	59,570,000	▲2.6%
2015	61,032,022	▲2.4%
2016	60,792,308	▼ -0.4%
2017	64,500,386	▲6.1%
2018	69,514,414	▲7.8%
2019	70,560,987	▲1.5%
2020	18,768,601	▼ -73.4%
2021	24,814,921	▲32.2%
2022	48,923,474	▲97.2%
2023	59,359,539	▲21.3%
2024	61,564,957	▲3.7%
2025	63,189,666	▲2.6%

=== Route statistics ===
Busiest routes at Frankfurt Airport (2023)
Rank	Destination	Departing passengers	Operating airlines
1	London–Heathrow	663,712	British Airways, Lufthansa
2	Berlin–Brandenburg	590,952	Lufthansa
3	Hamburg	531,011	Lufthansa
4	Vienna	487,940	Austrian Airlines, Lufthansa
5	Munich	477,400	Lufthansa
6	Dubai–International	440,236	Emirates, Lufthansa
7	Madrid	432,743	Air Europa, Iberia, Lufthansa
8	Palma de Mallorca	418,946	Condor, Discover Airlines, Lufthansa, TUI fly Deutschland
9	Istanbul	405,832	Lufthansa, Turkish Airlines
10	Barcelona	405,266	Discover Airlines, Lufthansa

Busiest domestic routes at Frankfurt Airport (2023)
Rank	Destination	Departing passengers	Operating airlines
1	Berlin–Brandenburg	590,952	Lufthansa
2	Hamburg	531,011	Lufthansa
3	Munich	477,400	Lufthansa
4	Hannover	142,476	Lufthansa
5	Bremen	132,644	Lufthansa
6	Düsseldorf	125,488	Lufthansa
7	Dresden	122,622	Lufthansa
8	Stuttgart	117,335	Lufthansa
9	Leipzig/Halle	99,131	Lufthansa
10	Nuremberg	98,947	Lufthansa

Busiest European routes at Frankfurt Airport (2023)
Rank	Destination	Departing passengers	Operating airlines
1	London–Heathrow	663,712	British Airways, Lufthansa
2	Vienna	487,940	Austrian Airlines, Lufthansa
3	Madrid	432,743	Air Europa, Iberia, Lufthansa
4	Palma de Mallorca	418,946	Condor, Discover Airlines, Lufthansa, TUI fly Deutschland
5	Istanbul	405,832	Lufthansa, Turkish Airlines
6	Barcelona	405,266	Discover Airlines, Lufthansa
7	Paris–Charles de Gaulle	374,596	Air France, Lufthansa
8	Lisbon	348,435	Lufthansa, TAP Air Portugal
9	Amsterdam	319,636	KLM, Lufthansa
10	Zurich	293,482	Lufthansa, Swiss International Air Lines

Busiest intercontinental routes at Frankfurt Airport (2023)
Rank	Destination	Departing passengers	Operating airlines
1	Dubai–International	440,236	Emirates, Lufthansa
2	Toronto–Pearson	386,210	Air Canada, Condor, Lufthansa
3	New York–JFK	354,927	Condor, Delta, Lufthansa, Singapore Airlines
4	Antalya	333,928	AJet, Condor, Corendon Airlines, Discover Airlines, Pegasus Airlines, SunExpress, Turkish Airlines
5	Chicago–O'Hare	331,175	Lufthansa, United Airlines
6	Washington–Dulles	322,066	Lufthansa, United Airlines
7	San Francisco	320,163	Condor, Lufthansa, United Airlines
8	Doha	296,002	Qatar Airways
9	Singapore	290,476	Lufthansa, Singapore Airlines
10	Seoul–Incheon	289,842	Asiana Airlines, Korean Air, Lufthansa

== Ground transport ==
Frankfurt Airport can be accessed by car, taxi, train or bus as it features an extensive transport network. There are two railway stations at the airport: one for suburban/regional trains and one for long-distance trains.

=== Inter-terminal transit ===
Passengers and visitors can change terminals with the people mover system SkyLine which has three stops in Terminal 1 (at gates A/Z, B and C), one in Terminal 2 for all gates and one in terminal 3. Some stops can only be used by passengers in or outside the Schengen zone which is achieved by separated cars and station entrances. The travel time between the terminals is 2 minutes with trains arriving every 2–3 minutes during the day. Each train has two cars, one airside (outside the Schengen area) and one landside (within the Schengen area). Most stations have a platform on each side of the train, so landside passengers can only step out onto the landside platform, and airside passengers can only step out onto the airside platform. Additionally, there is a regular bus service between the terminals.

=== Rail ===
==== Regional station ====
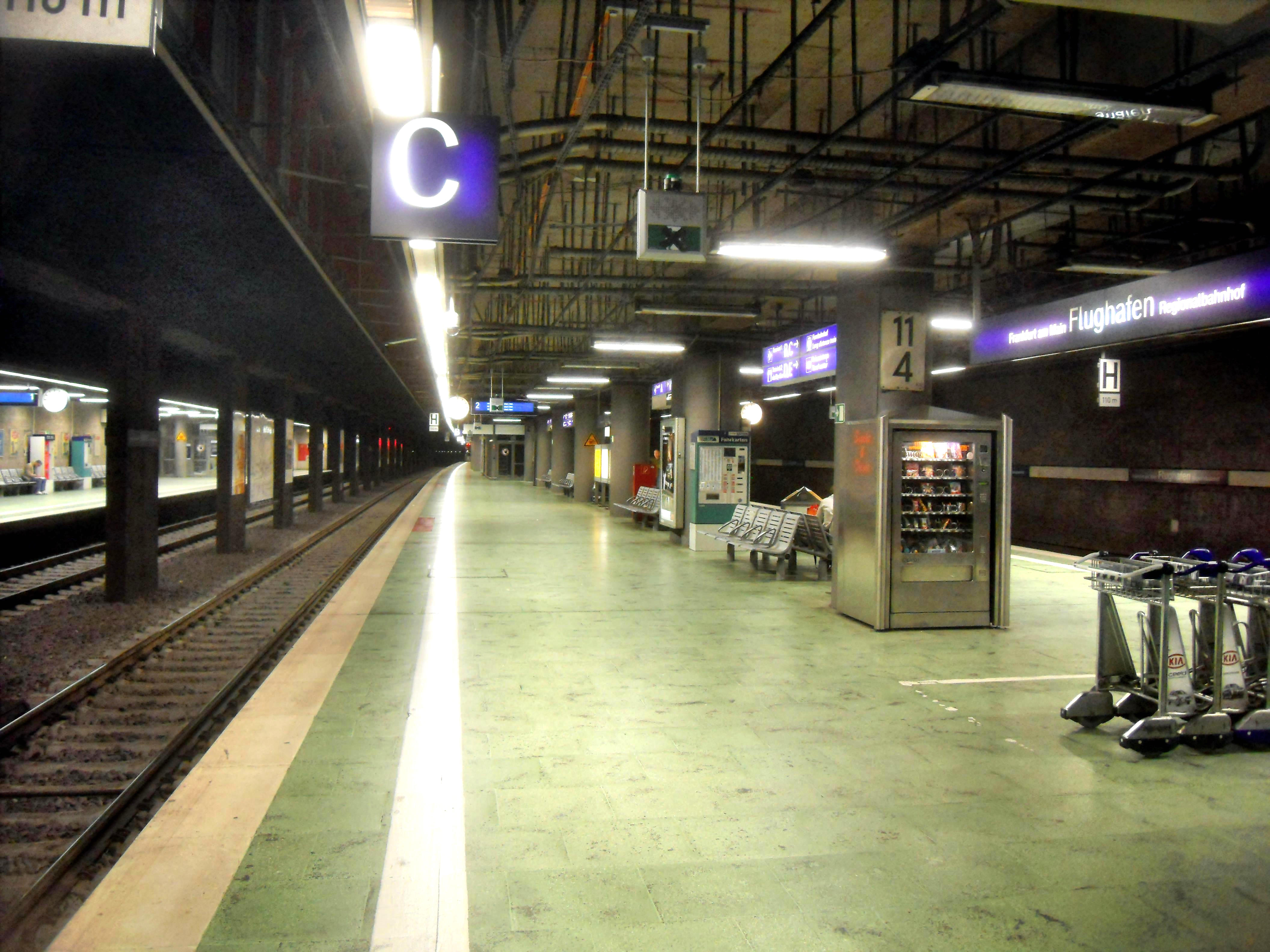
Regional station

Frankfurt Airport regional station (Frankfurt Flughafen Regionalbahnhof) at Terminal 1, concourse B, provides access to the S-Bahn commuter rail lines S8 and S9. Each of these lines have trains departing every 15 minutes during daytime to Hanau Central Station eastwards via Frankfurt Central Station and Offenbach East Station or Wiesbaden Central Station westwards via Rüsselsheim or Mainz Central Station (line S8) or Mainz-Kastel Station (line S9).

The journey time to Frankfurt Central Station is 10–12 minutes.

Regional Express (RE) trains to Saarbrücken, Koblenz or Würzburg call at this station. These trains provide less frequent but additional connections between Frankfurt Airport and the Central Station.

==== Long-distance station ====
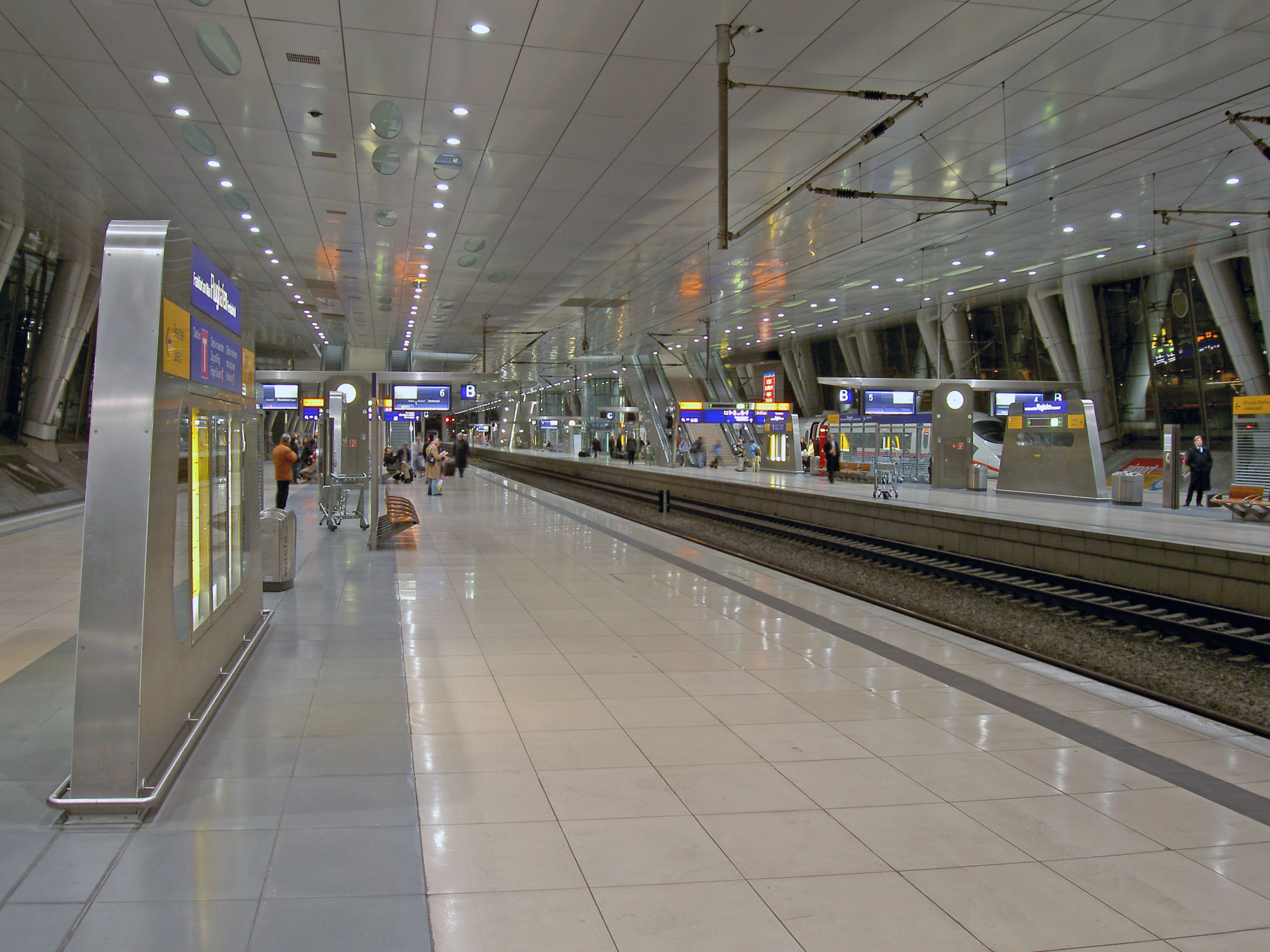
Long-distance station

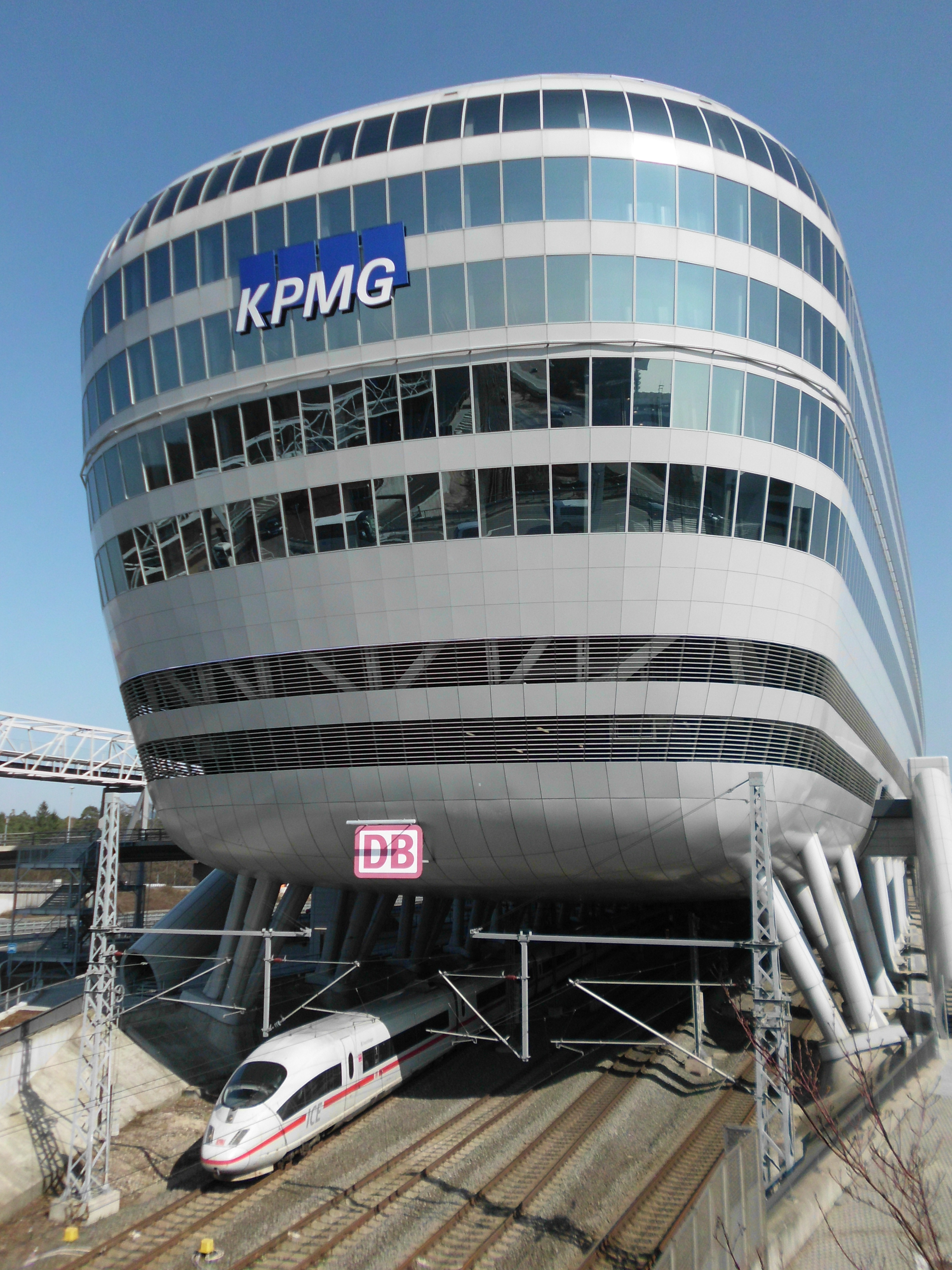
ICE 3 departing westward underneath The Squaire

Frankfurt Airport long-distance station (Frankfurt Flughafen Fernbahnhof) was opened in 1999. The station is squeezed in between the motorway A 3 and the four-lane Bundesstraße B43, linked to Terminal 1 by a connecting corridor for pedestrians that bridges the Autobahn. It is the end point of the newly built Cologne–Frankfurt high-speed rail line, which links southern Germany to the Rhine-Ruhr metropolitan area, the Netherlands and Belgium via Cologne at speeds up to 300 km/h (190 mph). About 10 trains per hour depart in all directions.

Deutsche Bahn operates the AIRail Service in conjunction with Lufthansa, American Airlines and Emirates. The service operates to the central stations of Bonn, Cologne, Düsseldorf, Freiburg, Karlsruhe, Leipzig, Hamburg, Hannover, Mannheim, Munich, Nuremberg, Stuttgart and to Kassel-Wilhelmshöhe.

=== Car ===
Frankfurt Airport is located in the Frankfurt City Forest and directly connected to an Autobahn intersection called Frankfurter Kreuz where the A3 and A5 meet. It takes a 10–15 minutes by car or taxi to get to Frankfurt Central Station or the centre of the city.

Passengers driving their own cars can park in multilevel parking garages (mostly underground) along the terminals. A long term holiday parking lot is located south of the runways and connected by shuttle bus to the terminals.

=== Bus and coaches ===
Various transport companies provide bus services to the airport from the surrounding areas as well as by coach to long-distance destinations.

Previously All Nippon Airways operated a bus service to Düsseldorf exclusively for ANA customers; that way Düsseldorf passengers would be transported to Frankfurt Airport to board their ANA flights. In 2014 ANA established a separate flight from Tokyo to Düsseldorf, causing the bus services to end.

=== Ground transport statistics ===
In 2024, 47% of surveyed passengers whose air travel originated in Frankfurt came by private car, 25% came by rail (13% using the local metropolitan train, 11% using the ICE and 1% using other forms of long-distance trains), 15% came by taxi, 6% came by a private shuttle service, 2% came with a rental car, and 2% arrived by bus.

== Incidents and accidents ==
- On 4 January 1938, a Deutsche Lufthansa Junkers Ju 52 crashed in a snowstorm on approach to FRA due to icing. All three crew and three passengers were killed.
- On 29 September 1938, a Luftwaffe Junkers Ju-52 crashed due to a preliminary ground contact caused by a wrong estimation of height. One occupant of the four on board was killed.
- On 22 March 1952, a KLM Royal Dutch Airlines Douglas DC-6 on a return flight from Johannesburg to Amsterdam crashed 7 km NE of FRA into a forest. Nine crew and 36 passengers of the 47 total on board died.
- On 14 October 1953, a Sabena Convair CV-240 crashed near Kelstenbach shortly after takeoff following loss of engine power 1 km N of FRA. All four crew and 40 passengers died.
- On 21 January 1967, an Air Ferry Douglas C-54, a cargo flight, struck trees some 2700 metres short of the runway while on a night-time instrument landing system approach. Both occupants were killed.
- On 24 November 1972, an Air Canada McDonnell Douglas DC-8 bound for Montreal, Canada was hijacked on the ground at FRA and a hijacker demanded a release of prisoners. The plane was stormed and the hijacker arrested. One person died.
- On 22 May 1983, during an air show at Rhein-Main Air Base, a Canadian RCAF Lockheed F-104 Starfighter crashed into a nearby road, hitting a car and killing all passengers, a vicar's family of five. His niece escaped the burning car but died 81 days later from serious burns. The pilot was able to eject.
- On 19 June 1985, a bomb cloaked in a canvas bag was detonated approx at 14:42 in the afternoon in Hall B of the Rhein Main Frankfurt Airport, decimating that section of the airport. The blast resulted in three deaths and 32 injuries, of which four were considered serious.
- In May 1999, a violent illegal immigrant was being deported by police, from Frankfurt to Cairo. He was restrained before the flight took off and when an officer attempted to talk to him later, he found that he was no longer alive.
- In September 2007, German authorities arrested three suspected terrorists for plotting a "massive" terror attack, which posed "an imminent threat" to Frankfurt Airport and the US Air Force base in Ramstein.
- On 2 March 2011, a gunman opened fire on a bus carrying US Air Force personnel at Frankfurt Airport, killing two and wounding two others.
- On 11 June 2018, Lufthansa Flight 426, an Airbus A340, preparing for a flight to Philadelphia International Airport sustained damage on pushback from the gate, the tow tug caught fire and the aircraft sustained damage to the nose and cockpit section. Ten airport staff, consisting of ground crew and emergency responders, suffered minor injuries as a result of smoke inhalation. The aircraft was written off.

== In popular culture ==
- Frankfurt Airport is featured in the Discovery Channel series X-Ray Mega Airport (also known as Inside Frankfurt Airport).
- Jinder Mahal pinned R-Truth at the Frankfurt Airport for the 24/7 Championship. This title change was shown on WWE.com and WWE's official social media accounts.

== See also ==
- Horst Julius Freiherr Treusch von Buttlar-Brandenfels
- Deutsche Zeppelin Reederei
- List of airports in Germany
- List of busiest airports by cargo traffic
- List of busiest airports by international passenger traffic
- List of the busiest airports in Germany
- Transport in Germany
