= Lufthansa City Airlines =

Regional airline of Germany

Lufthansa City Airlines GmbH

- Lufthansa City Airlines Airbus A320neo
IATA	ICAO	Call sign
VL	LHX	CITYAIR
- Founded: 5 April 2022; 4 years ago
- Commenced operations: 26 June 2024; 2 years ago
- Hubs: Munich Airport; Frankfurt Airport
- Frequent-flyer program: Miles & More
- Alliance: Star Alliance (affiliate)
- Fleet size: 18
- Parent company: Lufthansa Group
- Website: www.lufthansa-city.com

Lufthansa City Airlines (branded as Lufthansa City) is a German airline and a subsidiary of the Lufthansa Group. It operates short- and medium-haul services within Lufthansa's network, including feeder flights for the group's hubs at Munich Airport and Frankfurt Airport. The airline was founded in 2022 as City Airlines, received its air operator's certificate from the German Federal Aviation Authority in June 2023, and began scheduled operations on 26 June 2024.

Lufthansa has described the airline as part of a strategy to strengthen the competitiveness of its short-haul network and support long-haul growth from Germany. The creation and expansion of Lufthansa City Airlines became controversial among pilot and cabin-crew unions, which argued that the new operation was being used to replace Lufthansa CityLine and reduce labour costs under new collective-bargaining arrangements.

== History ==
=== Formation and launch ===
Lufthansa Group announced in October 2023 that City Airlines would begin operations in summer 2024, initially with Airbus A319 aircraft and with recruitment for cockpit and cabin crew beginning in November 2023. The group said the airline would operate from Munich and Frankfurt, provide feeder services for Lufthansa, and operate alongside Lufthansa CityLine. The airline subsequently adopted the public brand name Lufthansa City.

In February 2024, Lufthansa Group confirmed the airline's first destinations from Munich: Berlin, Hamburg, Bremen, Düsseldorf, Cologne, Hanover, Birmingham, Bordeaux and Manchester. Ticket sales began on 24 April 2024 under the IATA designator VL. The first scheduled flight, VL2508 from Munich to Birmingham, departed on 26 June 2024 using an Airbus A320neo.

Lufthansa City Airlines expanded during 2025. In April 2025 it took delivery of its first factory-new Airbus A320neo, registered D-AIJP and named Ingelheim am Rhein. Lufthansa Group said at the time that the aircraft brought the airline's fleet to eight aircraft and that further A320neo aircraft would expand the fleet to 15 aircraft by the end of 2025. In its 2025 annual report, Lufthansa Group reported that Lufthansa City Airlines had operated 11 Airbus A320neo and four Airbus A319 aircraft from Munich at the end of 2025, and that its fleet was planned to grow to 20 A320neos, four A319s and one A220 by the end of 2026.

Lufthansa City Airlines joined Star Alliance on 9 September 2025. On 9 February 2026, the airline opened its Frankfurt base with flight VL946 from Frankfurt to Manchester. Lufthansa Group said the initial Frankfurt schedule would include Manchester, Berlin, Valencia, Düsseldorf and Málaga, with additional destinations following in summer 2026 and the local Frankfurt fleet planned to reach seven Airbus A320neo aircraft by September 2026.

=== Rationale and labour controversy ===
Lufthansa Group's public rationale for City Airlines was that a more competitive short-haul network was needed to support the group's German hubs and planned long-haul growth. In November 2023, aero.de reported comments by Lufthansa Group chief executive Carsten Spohr that City Airlines would have the second-highest pay agreement among German airlines after the Lufthansa mainline, while still saving Lufthansa about one to two million euros per year and A320 aircraft compared with mainline operation. Spohr said the new air operator certificate would also help offset cost increases from the latest pilot agreement for Lufthansa's core airlines.

By June 2024, Spohr had publicly described Lufthansa City Airlines as the future replacement for Lufthansa CityLine, which had long operated feeder flights for Lufthansa's hubs. He said that CityLine would no longer be able to use larger aircraft with more than 95 seats under a collective-bargaining restriction with Vereinigung Cockpit, while its smaller Bombardier CRJ900 aircraft were nearing technical cycle limits. Airliners.de reported that Lufthansa management also wanted to lower the cost of feeder flights by moving some work away from the higher collective wage standards of the core Lufthansa brand and negotiating new agreements for the new operation.

Unions disputed Lufthansa's explanation. Vereinigung Cockpit said in June 2024 that Spohr's account of the 95-seat restriction was shortened and misleading, arguing that the union had repeatedly offered to adjust the rule to allow Lufthansa CityLine to continue operating. The union described the new airline as an unnecessary and possibly impermissible circumvention of existing collective agreements. The flight attendants' union UFO had already warned in October 2023 that City Airlines could lead to the rapid end of Lufthansa CityLine and said Lufthansa was seeking significant concessions from CityLine cabin staff in pay, working time, deployment conditions, leave entitlement and roster stability as part of any move to the new airline.

In April 2026, Lufthansa City Airlines and the ver.di union announced a first collective labour agreement for cockpit and cabin crew, with provisions covering pay, working conditions, company pension plans and performance-based compensation. Lufthansa City Airlines said most of its flight crew had chosen ver.di as their representative, while the agreements were to apply retroactively from 1 April 2026 and run for three years, subject to committee approval. Six days later, Lufthansa Group announced that it would permanently remove Lufthansa CityLine's 27 operational aircraft from the flight programme from 18 April 2026, citing higher kerosene costs, burdens from labour disputes and the high operating costs and technical age of the remaining CityLine Canadair jets. The group said transfer options to Lufthansa City Airlines had previously been offered to cockpit and cabin crews.

== Destinations ==
Lufthansa City Airlines operates within the Lufthansa network, with flights sold through Lufthansa Group sales channels under the VL airline code. Its first routes were from Munich, while Frankfurt operations began in February 2026. The following destinations have been announced or operated by Lufthansa City Airlines:

Country	City	Airport	Notes	Refs
Bulgaria	Sofia	Vasil Levski Sofia Airport		
Finland	Helsinki	Helsinki Airport	Frankfurt network expansion from summer 2026	
Finland	Oulu	Oulu Airport		
France	Bordeaux	Bordeaux–Mérignac Airport		
France	Marseille	Marseille Provence Airport	Frankfurt network expansion from summer 2026	
France	Paris	Charles de Gaulle Airport		
Germany	Berlin	Berlin Brandenburg Airport		
Germany	Bremen	Bremen Airport		
Germany	Cologne/Bonn	Cologne Bonn Airport		
Germany	Düsseldorf	Düsseldorf Airport		
Germany	Frankfurt	Frankfurt Airport	Hub	
Germany	Hamburg	Hamburg Airport		
Germany	Hanover	Hannover Airport		
Germany	Munich	Munich Airport	Hub	
Germany	Münster/Osnabrück	Münster Osnabrück Airport		
Ireland	Dublin	Dublin Airport		
Italy	Catania	Catania–Fontanarossa Airport		
Italy	Naples	Naples International Airport		
Italy	Rome	Leonardo da Vinci–Fiumicino Airport		
Malta	Valletta	Malta International Airport		
Portugal	Faro	Faro Airport		
Romania	Bucharest	Bucharest Henri Coandă International Airport		
Romania	Timișoara	Timișoara Traian Vuia International Airport		
Spain	Alicante	Alicante–Elche Miguel Hernández Airport		
Spain	Barcelona	Josep Tarradellas Barcelona–El Prat Airport		
Spain	Bilbao	Bilbao Airport	Frankfurt network expansion from summer 2026	
Spain	Ibiza	Ibiza Airport	Frankfurt network expansion from summer 2026	
Spain	Málaga	Málaga Airport		
Spain	Palma de Mallorca	Palma de Mallorca Airport		
Spain	Seville	Seville Airport		
Spain	Valencia	Valencia Airport		
Sweden	Stockholm	Stockholm Arlanda Airport	Frankfurt network expansion from summer 2026	
United Kingdom	Birmingham	Birmingham Airport	First scheduled destination	
United Kingdom	Edinburgh	Edinburgh Airport		
United Kingdom	London	Heathrow Airport		
United Kingdom	Manchester	Manchester Airport	First Frankfurt destination	

=== Codeshare agreements ===
Lufthansa City Airlines maintains a codeshare agreement with Lufthansa.

== Fleet ==
=== Current fleet ===
As of July 2026, Lufthansa City Airlines operates the following aircraft:

Lufthansa City fleet
Aircraft	In service	Planned by end 2026	Orders/options	Passengers	Notes
Airbus A220-300	0	1	40 firm orders, plus 20 options	148	First delivery scheduled for 2026.
Airbus A319	4	4	—	150	
Airbus A320neo	14	20	—	180	First factory-new aircraft delivered in April 2025.
Total	18	25	40 firm orders, plus 20 options		

=== Fleet development ===
Lufthansa Group expect the fleet to reach 25 aircraft by the end of 2026, including the airline's first Airbus A220.
