= SkyLine (Frankfurt) =

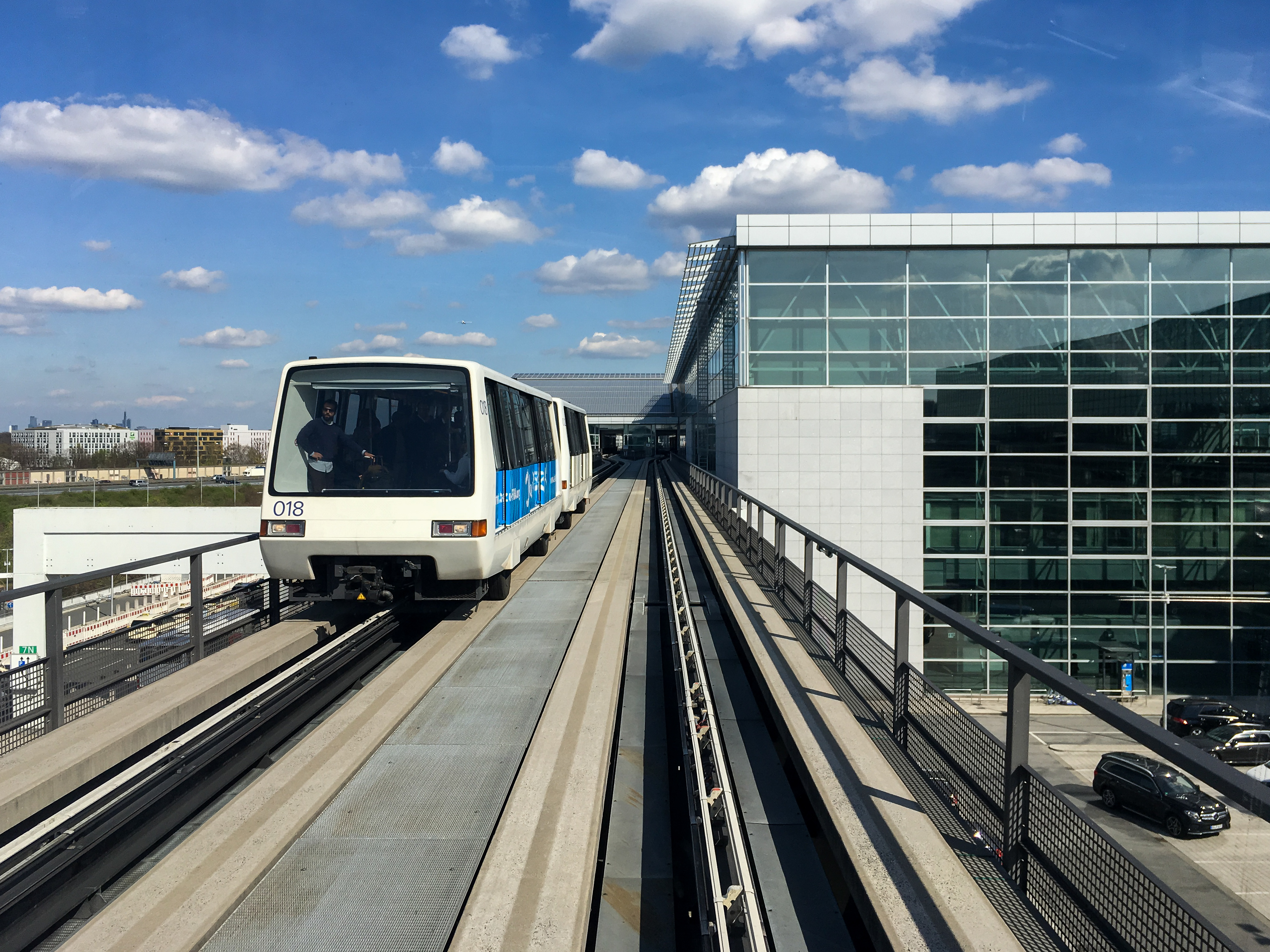

Overview
- Status: Operational
- Owner: Frankfurt Airport/Fraport AG
- Locale: Frankfurt, Hesse, Germany
- Stations: 4

Service
- Type: People mover
- Operator: Frankfurt Airport/Fraport AG
- Rolling stock: Bombardier CX-100 (Original); Siemens Airval (Extension)
- Ridership: 10,000,000 journeys per year

History
- Opened: 1994

Technical
- Line length: 5.6 km (3.5 mi)
- Character: Fully elevated, grade-separated
- Track gauge: 2,642 mm
- Operating speed: 80 km/h (50 mph)

SkyLine is a free automatic people mover system at Frankfurt Airport which opened in 1994. Using Bombardier CX-100 for the original section and Siemens Airval for the extension, the system links the three airport terminals within 8 minutes.

The 60 million annual passengers of the airport and its 75,000 employees generate an annual traffic of 10 million journeys on Skyline.

The line is not to be confused with the Squaire-Metro, a MiniMetro system connecting "The Squaire" to a nine-storey car park.

== Routes and stations ==
The SkyLine runs above the departure floor of Terminals 1, 2 and 3. Unlike the regional train station, this people mover was not part of the original plan for Terminal 1's construction, and only became necessary once Terminal 2 was built. The original SkyLine route is 5.6 km (3.47 mi) long and has eight stations. As part of the Terminal 3 expansion project, a second double-track SkyLine route was added, partially running parallel to the original alignment between Terminals 1 and 2, and can reach speeds up to 80 km/h (50 mph) at a straight part of the line while elevation lowered to ground level to avoid blocking visibility of landing aircraft.The two lines have eight track switches in total and seven stations, west to east:

- Terminal 1, Concourse A, Z
- Terminal 1, Concourse B (access to buses, long-distance train station and regional train station)
- Terminal 1, Concourse C (only for non-Schengen transfer passengers, future transfer from old to new Skyine)
- Terminal 2 (Enlarged for transfer from old to new Skyline)
- Terminal 3

East of Terminal 2 station is a depot and maintenance yard.

Terminal 1, Concourse C station was opened on 21 June 2017.

=== Temporary suspension of the new line ===
The new line that connects terminals 1, 2 and 3 was shortly out of service from May to June 2026 due to technical adjustments and optimizations identified during the first weeks of high-volume operations. Instead, 20 buses ran every 2 minutes from 05:00 to 23:00, and from 23:00 to 05:00 buses ran every 10 minutes. Since 15 June 2026, the line is back in operation.

=== Closure of Terminal 2 ===
Despite the closure of Terminal 2 for renovations on 9 June 2026, the SkyLine station on both lines remains open as "key infrastructure", just like the baggage belts, the apron and the parking garage.

== Frequency ==
The SkyLine has a headway of 2 minutes and operates from 05:00 to 23:00. During the airport's nighttime service break, a bus shuttle operates instead. The Skyline can be used free of charge.

== Operation ==
The system was built by AEG – later part of AdTranz – in 1994 and moved 10,000,000 passengers in the year 2000.

The original SkyLine uses 18 2-car Bombardier CX-100 trainsets. The rubber-tyred vehicles drive on concrete roll ways and get their current from a central guide and third rail. Each car has two double-leaf doors per side. The top/operating speed is 80 km/h (50 mph). Traction is provided by two Bombardier 1460-P4 DC motors. The line is automated and driverless; platform screen doors prevent passengers from getting onto the tracks and/or entering restricted areas.

The extension SkyLine between Terminal 2 and Terminal 3 uses Airval technology supplied by Siemens Mobility and is capable of a maximum operating speed of 80 km/h

== Separation of airside and landside areas ==
The two-car trainsets of the first line each have a "transit" car and a "domestic" car. The western car is for landside visitors, Schengen connections and passengers starting/ending their journeys in Frankfurt. The eastern car, on the other hand, is only accessible to non-Schengen transfer passengers (non-Schengen – non-Schengen connections). With the exception of Terminal 1, Concourse C station, all stations have a central platform and two side platforms each (Spanish solution of sorts).

The two cars open their doors to different sides. One side of the platform is the Schengen side, while the other side is the non-Schengen side. Since the SkyLine transports passengers that have not gone through border control to enter the Schengen area and the tracks pass by restricted areas, part of the tracks is fenced off with razor wire.

Platform side for Schengen and non-Schengen passengers
Station	Exit for Schengen	Exit for non-Schengen
Terminal 1, Concourse A, Z	left (island platform)	right (side platforms)
Terminal 1, Concourse B	left (island platform)	right (side platforms)
Terminal 1, Concourse C (non-Schengen only)	no exit	left (island platform)
Terminal 2, Concourse D, E	right (side platforms)	left (island platform)

== Extensions ==
A second route was opened in 2026. It starts at "Fernbahnhof" (long-distance train station), above the regional train station's connection passageway to the long-distance station. From there, it runs elevated to Terminal 2, Concourse D, E station, which is designed for an interchange between the two lines. The station turns into a 5-platform (3 island, 2 side) interchange. The line then continues east to the A5 motorway, dropping down to ground level to not hinder the sight of landing Aircraft, then curve south to parallel it and run at-grade but still grade-separated, with an emergency stop placed halfway, until finally reaching Terminal 3 station. The new line is about 5.7 km (3.54 mi) long. Operating speed is 80 km/h (50 mph) on the Terminal 2 – Terminal 3 section.

The system was constructed by a consortium led by Siemens Mobility using the Airval technology.
