= List of busiest airports by international passenger traffic =

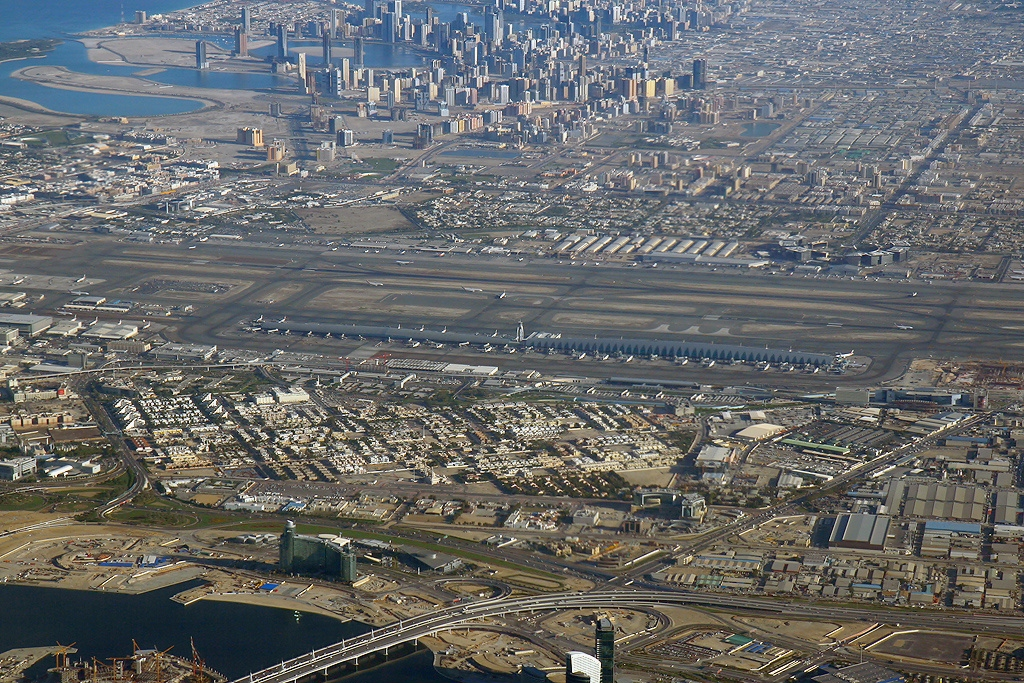
Dubai International Airport is the world's busiest airport by international passenger traffic

The following is a list of the world's busiest airports by international passenger traffic. For the list of world's busiest airports by total passenger traffic (both domestic and international), see List of busiest airports by passenger traffic.

== 2025 statistics ==
Airports Council International's preliminary figures are as follows.

Rank	City	Airport	Location	Code (IATA/ICAO)	Total passengers	Rank change	% change
1.	Dubai	(United Arab Emirates) Dubai International Airport	Al Garhoud, Dubai, United Arab Emirates	DXB/OMDB	95,192,160	Steady	▲3.1%
2.	London	(United Kingdom) London Heathrow Airport	Hillingdon, Greater London, United Kingdom	LHR/EGLL	79,874,784	Steady	▲0.9%
3.	Seoul	(South Korea) Incheon International Airport	Jung-gu, Incheon, South Korea	ICN/RKSI	73,554,772	Steady	▲4.1%
4.	Singapore	Singapore Changi Airport	Changi, East Region, Singapore	SIN/WSSS	69,402,000	Steady	▲3.5%
5.	Amsterdam	(Netherlands) Amsterdam Airport Schiphol	Haarlemmermeer, North Holland, Netherlands	AMS/EHAM	68,767,548	Steady	▲2.9%
6.	Istanbul	(Turkey) Istanbul Airport	Arnavutköy, Istanbul, Turkey	IST/LTFM	66,608,849	▲1	▲5.8%
7.	Paris	(France) Paris-Charles de Gaulle Airport	Roissy-en-France, Val d'Oise, Île-de-France, France	CDG/LFPG	66,135,938	▼1	▲2.6%
8.	Hong Kong	Hong Kong International Airport	Chek Lap Kok, New Territories, Hong Kong	HKG/VHHH	60,824,359	▲1	▲14.9%
9.	Frankfurt	(Germany) Frankfurt Airport	Flughafen, Frankfurt, Hesse, Germany	FRA/EDDF	57,528,528	▼1	▲2.4%
10.	Doha	(Qatar) Hamad International Airport	Doha, Qatar	DOH/OTHH	54,338,667	Steady	▲3.1%

== 2024 statistics ==
Airports Council International's preliminary figures are as follows.

Rank	City	Airport	Location	Code (IATA/ICAO)	Total passengers	Rank change	% change
1.	Dubai	(United Arab Emirates) Dubai International Airport	Al Garhoud, Dubai, United Arab Emirates	DXB/OMDB	92,331,506	Steady	▲6.1%
2.	London	(United Kingdom) London Heathrow Airport	Hillingdon, Greater London, United Kingdom	LHR/EGLL	79,194,330	Steady	▲5.7%
3.	Seoul	(South Korea) Incheon International Airport	Jung-gu, Incheon, South Korea	ICN/RKSI	70,669,246	▲4	▲26.7%
4.	Singapore	Singapore Changi Airport	Changi, East Region, Singapore	SIN/WSSS	67,063,000	▲1	▲14.8%
5.	Amsterdam	(Netherlands) Amsterdam Airport Schiphol	Haarlemmermeer, North Holland, Netherlands	AMS/EHAM	66,822,849	▼2	▲8.0%
6.	Paris	(France) Paris-Charles de Gaulle Airport	Roissy-en-France, Val d'Oise, Île-de-France, France	CDG/LFPG	64,469,356	▼2	▲5.0%
7.	Istanbul	(Turkey) Istanbul Airport	Arnavutköy, Istanbul, Turkey	IST/LTFM	63,036,930	▼1	▲8.1%
8.	Frankfurt	(Germany) Frankfurt Airport	Flughafen, Frankfurt, Hesse, Germany	FRA/EDDF	56,185,219	Steady	▲3.9%
9.	Hong Kong	Hong Kong International Airport	Chek Lap Kok, New Territories, Hong Kong	HKG/VHHH	52,949,047	▲3	▲34.4%
10.	Doha	(Qatar) Hamad International Airport	Doha, Qatar	DOH/OTHH	52,714,976	▼1	▲14.8%

== 2023 statistics ==
Airports Council International's preliminary figures are as follows.

Rank	City	Airport	Location	Code (IATA/ICAO)	Total passengers	Rank change	% change
1.	Dubai	(United Arab Emirates) Dubai International Airport	Al Garhoud, Dubai, United Arab Emirates	DXB/OMDB	86,994,365	Steady	▲31.7%
2.	London	(United Kingdom) London Heathrow Airport	Hillingdon, Greater London, United Kingdom	LHR/EGLL	74,909,019	Steady	▲28.6%
3.	Amsterdam	(Netherlands) Amsterdam Airport Schiphol	Haarlemmermeer, North Holland, Netherlands	AMS/EHAM	61,882,546	Steady	▲17.9%
4.	Paris	(France) Paris-Charles de Gaulle Airport	Roissy-en-France, Val d'Oise, Île-de-France, France	CDG/LFPG	61,412,198	Steady	▲18.6%
5.	Singapore	Singapore Changi Airport	Changi, East Region, Singapore	SIN/WSSS	58,411,000	▲4	▲83.1%
6.	Istanbul	(Turkey) Istanbul Airport	Arnavutköy, Istanbul, Turkey	IST/LTFM	58,271,042	▼1	▲20.0%
7.	Seoul	(South Korea) Incheon International Airport	Jung-gu, Incheon, South Korea	ICN/RKSI	55,763,768	▲25	▲212.9%
8.	Frankfurt	(Germany) Frankfurt Airport	Flughafen, Frankfurt, Hesse, Germany	FRA/EDDF	54,089,293	▼2	▲20.8%
9.	Doha	(Qatar) Hamad International Airport	Doha, Qatar	DOH/OTHH	45,913,805	▼1	▲28.5%
10.	Madrid	(Spain) Madrid-Barajas Airport	Madrid, Comunidad de Madrid, Spain	MAD/LEMD	43,799,968	▼3	▲20.9%

== 2022 statistics ==
Airports Council International's preliminary figures are as follows.

Rank	City	Airport	Location	Code (IATA/ICAO)	Total passengers	Rank change	% change
1.	Dubai	(United Arab Emirates) Dubai International Airport	Al Garhoud, Dubai, United Arab Emirates	DXB/OMDB	66,069,981	Steady	▲127.0%
2.	London	(United Kingdom) London Heathrow Airport	Hillingdon, Greater London, United Kingdom	LHR/EGLL	58,243,060	▲5	▲230.5%
3.	Amsterdam	(Netherlands) Amsterdam Airport Schiphol	Haarlemmermeer, North Holland, Netherlands	AMS/EHAM	52,467,346	Steady	▲105.8%
4.	Paris	(France) Paris-Charles de Gaulle Airport	Roissy-en-France, Val d'Oise, Île-de-France, France	CDG/LFPG	51,763,569	▲1	▲128.9%
5.	Istanbul	(Turkey) Istanbul Airport	Arnavutköy, Istanbul, Turkey	IST/LTFM	48,569,571	▼3	▲83.3%
6.	Frankfurt	(Germany) Frankfurt Airport	Flughafen, Frankfurt, Hesse, Germany	FRA/EDDF	44,771,711	▼2	▲97.3%
7.	Madrid	(Spain) Madrid-Barajas Airport	Madrid, Comunidad de Madrid, Spain	MAD/LEMD	36,231,191	▲2	▲136.2%
8	Doha	(Qatar) Hamad International Airport	Doha, Qatar	DOH/OTHH	35,726,721	▼2	▲160.4%
9.	Singapore	Singapore Changi Airport	Changi, East Region, Singapore	SIN/WSSS	31,902,000	▲86	▲952.9%
10.	London	(United Kingdom) London Gatwick Airport	Crawley, West Sussex, United Kingdom	LGW/EGKK	30,145,083	▲45	▲501.5%

== 2021 statistics ==
Airports Council International's preliminary figures are as follows.

Rank	City	Airport	Location	Code (IATA/ICAO)	Total passengers	Rank change	% change
1.	Dubai	(United Arab Emirates) Dubai International Airport	Al Garhoud, Dubai, United Arab Emirates	DXB/OMDB	29,110,609	Steady	▲12.7%
2.	Istanbul	(Turkey) Istanbul Airport	Arnavutköy, Istanbul, Turkey	IST/LTFM	26,505,670	▲4	▲66.0%
3.	Amsterdam	(Netherlands) Amsterdam Airport Schiphol	Haarlemmermeer, North Holland, Netherlands	AMS/EHAM	25,488,783	▼1	▲22.1%
4.	Frankfurt	(Germany) Frankfurt Airport	Flughafen, Frankfurt, Hesse, Germany	FRA/EDDF	22,697,490	▲1	▲34.8%
5.	Paris	(France) Paris-Charles de Gaulle Airport	Roissy-en-France, Val d'Oise, Île-de-France, France	CDG/LFPG	22,616,995	▼1	▲18.7%
6.	Doha	(Qatar) Hamad International Airport	Doha, Qatar	DOH/OTHH	17,701,978	▲1	▲41.4%
7.	London	(United Kingdom) London Heathrow Airport	Hillingdon, Greater London, United Kingdom	LHR/EGLL	17,624,931	▼4	▼14.7%
8	Antalya	(Turkey) Antalya Airport	Antalya, Turkey	AYT/LTAI	17,247,876	▲23	▲160.4%
9.	Madrid	(Spain) Madrid-Barajas Airport	Madrid, Comunidad de Madrid, Spain	MAD/LEMD	15,337,775	▲1	▲38.8%
10.	Cancún	(Mexico) Cancún International Airport	Cancún, Mexico	CUN/MMUN	13,261,951	▲18	▲94.5%

== 2020 statistics ==
Airports Council International's preliminary figures are as follows.

Rank	City	Airport	Location	Code (IATA/ICAO)	Total passengers	Rank change	% change
1.	Dubai	(United Arab Emirates) Dubai International Airport	Al Garhoud, Dubai, United Arab Emirates	DXB/OMDB	25,831,363	Steady	▼70.1%
2.	Amsterdam	(Netherlands) Amsterdam Airport Schiphol	Haarlemmermeer, North Holland, Netherlands	AMS/EHAM	20,880,990	▲1	▼70.9%
3.	London	(United Kingdom) London Heathrow Airport	Hillingdon, Greater London, United Kingdom	LHR/EGLL	20,650,473	▼1	▼72.8%
4.	Paris	(France) Paris-Charles de Gaulle Airport	Roissy-en-France, Val d'Oise, Île-de-France, France	CDG/LFPG	19,057,856	▲2	▼72.7%
5.	Frankfurt	(Germany) Frankfurt Airport	Flughafen, Frankfurt, Hesse, Germany	FRA/EDDF	16,837,104	▲3	▼73.3%
6.	Istanbul	(Turkey) Istanbul Airport	Arnavutköy, Istanbul, Turkey	IST/LTFM	15,936,505	▲8	▼59.7%
7.	Doha	(Qatar) Hamad International Airport	Doha, Qatar	DOH/OTHH	12,522,288	▲8	▼67.7%
8	Seoul	(South Korea) Seoul Incheon International Airport	Jung-gu, Incheon, South Korea	ICN/RKSI	11,955,756	▼3	▼83.1%
9.	Singapore	Singapore Changi Airport	Changi, East Region, Singapore	SIN/WSSS	11,635,000	▼2	▼82.8%
10.	Madrid	(Spain) Madrid-Barajas Airport	Madrid, Comunidad de Madrid, Spain	MAD/LEMD	11,052,157	▲1	▼75.4%

== 2019 statistics ==
Airports Council International's (January–December) preliminary figures are as follows.

Rank	City	Airport	Location	Code (IATA/ICAO)	Total passengers	Rank change	% change
1.	Dubai	(United Arab Emirates) Dubai International Airport	Al Garhoud, Dubai, United Arab Emirates	DXB/OMDB	86,328,896	Steady	▼2.9%
2.	London	(United Kingdom) London Heathrow Airport	Hillingdon, Greater London, United Kingdom	LHR/EGLL	76,043,973	Steady	▲1.0%
3.	Amsterdam	(Netherlands) Amsterdam Airport Schiphol	Haarlemmermeer, North Holland, Netherlands	AMS/EHAM	71,679,691	▲1	▲1.0%
4.	Hong Kong	Hong Kong International Airport	Chek Lap Kok, New Territories, Hong Kong	HKG/VHHH	71,287,552	▼1	▼4.1%
5.	Seoul	(South Korea) Seoul Incheon International Airport	Jung-gu, Incheon, South Korea	ICN/RKSI	70,578,050	Steady	▲4.3%
6.	Paris	(France) Paris-Charles de Gaulle Airport	Roissy-en-France, Val d'Oise, Île-de-France, France	CDG/LFPG	69,823,084	Steady	▲5.2%
7.	Singapore	Singapore Changi Airport	Changi, East Region, Singapore	SIN/WSSS	67,601,000	Steady	▲4.2%
8.	Frankfurt	(Germany) Frankfurt Airport	Flughafen, Frankfurt, Hesse, Germany	FRA/EDDF	63,067,739	Steady	▲2.1%
9.	Bangkok	(Thailand) Suvarnabhumi Airport	Racha Thewa, Bang Phli, Samut Prakan, Thailand	BKK/VTBS	52,933,565	Steady	▲4.1%
10.	Taipei	(Taiwan) Taoyuan International Airport	Dayuan, Taoyuan, Taiwan	TPE/RCTP	48,360,290	▲1	▲4.8%
11.	Madrid	(Spain) Madrid-Barajas Airport	Madrid, Comunidad de Madrid, Spain	MAD/LEMD	44,917,756	▲3	▲7.3%
12.	Kuala Lumpur	(Malaysia) Kuala Lumpur International Airport	Sepang, Selangor, Malaysia	KUL/WMKK	44,854,685	Steady	▲3.1%
13.	London	(United Kingdom) London Gatwick Airport	Crawley, West Sussex, United Kingdom	LGW/EGKK	43,123,851	Steady	▲1.8%
14.	Istanbul	(Turkey) Istanbul Airport	Arnavutköy, Istanbul, Turkey	IST/LTFM	39,434,579	▲NEW	0.0%
15.	Doha	(Qatar) Hamad International Airport	Doha, Qatar	DOH/OTBD	38,786,566	▲3	▲12.4%
16.	Barcelona	(Spain) Barcelona–El Prat Airport	El Prat de Llobregat, Barcelona, Catalonia, Spain	BCN/LEBL	38,630,785	▼1	▲5.4%
17.	Munich	(Germany) Munich Airport	Oberding/Hallbergmoos/Marzling, Erding/Freising, Bavaria, Germany	MUC/EDDM	38,309,112	▼1	▲4.8%
18.	Tokyo	(Japan) Narita International Airport	Narita, Chiba, Japan	NRT/RJAA	36,645,448	▼1	▲3.8%
19.	New York City	(United States) John F. Kennedy International Airport	Queens, New York City, New York, United States	JFK/KJFK	34,317,281	Steady	▲2.4%
20.	Dublin	(Republic of Ireland) Dublin Airport	Swords, County Dublin, Ireland	DUB/EIDW	32,572,741	▲NEW	▲4.6%

== 2018 statistics ==
Airports Council International's (January–December) preliminary figures are as follows.

Rank	City	Airport	Location	Code (IATA/ICAO)	Total passengers	Rank change	% change
1.	Dubai	(United Arab Emirates) Dubai International Airport	Al Garhoud, Dubai, United Arab Emirates	DXB/OMDB	88,885,367	Steady	▲1.3%
2.	London	(United Kingdom) London Heathrow Airport	Hillingdon, Greater London, United Kingdom	LHR/EGLL	75,306,939	Steady	▲2.9%
3.	Hong Kong	Hong Kong International Airport	Chek Lap Kok, New Territories, Hong Kong, China	HKG/VHHH	74,360,976	Steady	▲2.6%
4.	Amsterdam	(Netherlands) Amsterdam Airport Schiphol	Haarlemmermeer, North Holland, Netherlands	AMS/EHAM	70,956,258	Steady	▲3.7%
5.	Seoul	(South Korea) Seoul Incheon International Airport	Jung-gu, Incheon, South Korea	ICN/RKSI	67,676,147	▲2	▲10.0%
6.	Paris	(France) Paris-Charles de Gaulle Airport	Roissy-en-France, Val d'Oise, Île-de-France, France	CDG/LFPG	66,383,494	▼1	▲4.2%
7.	Singapore	Singapore Changi Airport	Changi, East Region, Singapore	SIN/WSSS	64,890,000	▼1	▲5.4%
8.	Frankfurt	(Germany) Frankfurt Airport	Flughafen, Frankfurt, Hesse, Germany	FRA/EDDF	61,774,663	Steady	▲8.1%
9.	Bangkok	(Thailand) Suvarnabhumi Airport	Racha Thewa, Bang Phli, Samut Prakan, Thailand	BKK/VTBS	50,868,846	Steady	▲4.2%
10.	Istanbul	(Turkey) Atatürk International Airport	Yeşilköy, Bakırköy, Istanbul, Turkey	IST/LTBA	49,130,261	▲1	▲10.1%
11.	Taipei	(Taiwan) Taoyuan International Airport	Dayuan, Taoyuan, Taiwan	TPE/RCTP	46,152,164	▼1	▲3.8%
12.	Kuala Lumpur	(Malaysia) Kuala Lumpur International Airport	Sepang, Selangor, Malaysia	KUL/WMKK	43,531,741	Steady	▲2.8%
13.	London	(United Kingdom) London Gatwick Airport	Crawley, West Sussex, United Kingdom	LGW/EGKK	41,476,858	Steady	▲2.1%
14.	Madrid	(Spain) Madrid-Barajas Airport	Madrid, Comunidad de Madrid, Spain	MAD/LEMD	41,857,125	Steady	▲8.8%
15.	Barcelona	(Spain) Barcelona–El Prat Airport	El Prat de Llobregat, Barcelona, Catalonia, Spain	BCN/LEBL	36,545,787	▲2	▲6.2%
16.	Munich	(Germany) Munich Airport	Oberding/Hallbergmoos/Marzling, Erding/Freising, Bavaria, Germany	MUC/EDDM	36,545,787	Steady	▲5.3%
17.	Tokyo	(Japan) Narita International Airport	Narita, Chiba, Japan	NRT/RJAA	35,300,076	▲1	▲6.7%
18.	Doha	(Qatar) Hamad International Airport	Doha, Qatar	DOH/OTBD	34,495,078	▼3	▼2.2%
19.	New York City	(United States) John F. Kennedy International Airport	Queens, New York City, New York, United States	JFK/KJFK	33,485,078	Steady	▲2.8%
20.	Toronto	(Canada) Toronto Pearson International Airport	Mississauga, Ontario, Canada	YYZ/CYYZ	31,610,348	Steady	▲6.7%

== 2017 statistics ==
Airports Council International's (January–December) preliminary figures are as follows.

Rank	City	Airport	Location	Code (IATA/ICAO)	Total passengers	Rank change	% change
1.	Dubai	(United Arab Emirates) Dubai International Airport	Al Garhoud, Dubai, United Arab Emirates	DXB/OMDB	87,722,023	Steady	▲5.6%
2.	London	(United Kingdom) London Heathrow Airport	Hillingdon, Greater London, United Kingdom	LHR/EGLL	73,187,198	Steady	▲3.0%
3.	Hong Kong	Hong Kong International Airport	Chek Lap Kok, New Territories, Hong Kong, China	HKG/VHHH	72,462,116	Steady	▲3.4%
4.	Amsterdam	(Netherlands) Amsterdam Airport Schiphol	Haarlemmermeer, North Holland, Netherlands	AMS/EHAM	68,401,146	Steady	▲7.7%
5.	Paris	(France) Paris-Charles de Gaulle Airport	Roissy-en-France, Val d'Oise, Île-de-France, France	CDG/LFPG	63,697,227	Steady	▲5.5%
6.	Singapore	Singapore Changi Airport	Changi, East Region, Singapore	SIN/WSSS	61,574,000	Steady	▲5.9%
7.	Seoul	(South Korea) Seoul Incheon International Airport	Jung-gu, Incheon, South Korea	ICN/RKSI	61,520,572	Steady	▲7.6%
8.	Frankfurt	(Germany) Frankfurt Airport	Flughafen, Frankfurt, Hesse, Germany	FRA/EDDF	57,122,348	Steady	▲6.4%
9.	Bangkok	(Thailand) Suvarnabhumi Airport	Racha Thewa, Bang Phli, Samut Prakan, Thailand	BKK/VTBS	48,811,600	Steady	▲7.8%
10.	Taipei	(Taiwan) Taoyuan International Airport	Dayuan, Taoyuan, Taiwan	TPE/RCTP	44,479,754	Steady	▲6.2%
11.	Istanbul	(Turkey) Atatürk International Airport	Yeşilköy, Bakırköy, Istanbul, Turkey	IST/LTBA	44,476,589	Steady	▲7.5%
12.	Kuala Lumpur	(Malaysia) Kuala Lumpur International Airport	Sepang, Selangor, Malaysia	KUL/WMKK	42,354,534	▲2	▲14.6%
13.	London	(United Kingdom) London Gatwick Airport	Crawley, West Sussex, United Kingdom	LGW/EGKK	41,476,858	▼1	▲5.3%
14.	Madrid	(Spain) Madrid-Barajas Airport	Madrid, Comunidad de Madrid, Spain	MAD/LEMD	38,479,159	▲1	▲6.7%
15.	Doha	(Qatar) Hamad International Airport	Doha, Qatar	DOH/OTBD	35,262,164	▼2	▼5.3%
16.	Munich	(Germany) Munich Airport	Oberding/Hallbergmoos/Marzling, Erding/Freising, Bavaria, Germany	MUC/EDDM	34,721,745	Steady	▲6.6%
17.	Barcelona	(Spain) Barcelona–El Prat Airport	El Prat de Llobregat, Barcelona, Catalonia, Spain	BCN/LEBL	34,527,018	Steady	▲6.8%
18.	Tokyo	(Japan) Narita International Airport	Narita, Chiba, Japan	NRT/RJAA	33,090,944	Steady	▲3.4%
19.	New York City	(United States) John F. Kennedy International Airport	Queens, New York City, New York, United States	JFK/KJFK	32,431,419	Steady	▲2.1%
20.	Toronto	(Canada) Toronto Pearson International Airport	Mississauga, Ontario, Canada	YYZ/CYYZ	29,655,141	▲2	▲8.1%

== 2016 statistics ==
Airports Council International's (January–December) preliminary figures are as follows.

Rank	City	Airport	Location	Code (IATA/ICAO)	Total passengers	Rank change	% change
1.	Dubai	(United Arab Emirates) Dubai International Airport	Garhoud, Dubai, United Arab Emirates	DXB/OMDB	83,105,798	Steady	▲7.3%
2.	London	(United Kingdom) London Heathrow Airport	Hillingdon, Greater London, United Kingdom	LHR/EGLL	71,030,114	Steady	▲1.7%
3.	Hong Kong	Hong Kong International Airport	Chek Lap Kok, New Territories, Hong Kong, China	HKG/VHHH	70,098,216	Steady	▲3.0%
4.	Amsterdam	(Netherlands) Amsterdam Airport Schiphol	Haarlemmermeer, North Holland, Netherlands	AMS/EHAM	63,533,504	▲1	▲9.1%
5.	Paris	(France) Paris-Charles de Gaulle Airport	Roissy-en-France, Val d'Oise, Île-de-France, France	CDG/LFPG	60,384,622	▼1	Steady
6.	Singapore	Singapore Changi Airport	Changi, East Region, Singapore	SIN/WSSS	58,158,000	Steady	▲6.1%
7.	Seoul	(South Korea) Seoul Incheon International Airport	Jung-gu, Incheon, South Korea	ICN/RKSI	57,152,206	▲1	▲17.3%
8.	Frankfurt	(Germany) Frankfurt Airport	Flughafen, Frankfurt, Hesse, Germany	FRA/EDDF	53,707,953	▼1	▼0.5%
9.	Bangkok	(Thailand) Suvarnabhumi Airport	Racha Thewa, Bang Phli, Samut Prakan, Thailand	BKK/VTBS	45,291,073	Steady	▲4.7%
10.	Taipei	(Taiwan) Taoyuan International Airport	Dayuan, Taoyuan, Taiwan	TPE/RCTP	41,876,848	▲1	▲9.9%
11.	Istanbul	(Turkey) Atatürk International Airport	Yeşilköy, Bakırköy, Istanbul, Turkey	IST/LTBA	41,281,937	▼1	▼2.2%
12.	London	(United Kingdom) London Gatwick Airport	Crawley, West Sussex, United Kingdom	LGW/EGKK	39,264,495	Steady	▲7.1%
13.	Doha	(Qatar) Hamad International Airport	Doha, Qatar	DOH/OTBD	37,216,179	▲3	▲20.4%
14.	Kuala Lumpur	(Malaysia) Kuala Lumpur International Airport	Sepang, Selangor, Malaysia	KUL/WMKK	36,962,822	▼1	▲7.3%
15.	Madrid	(Spain) Madrid-Barajas Airport	Madrid, Comunidad de Madrid, Spain	MAD/LEMD	36,074,688	▼1	▲6.8%
16.	Munich	(Germany) Munich Airport	Oberding/Hallbergmoos/Marzling, Erding/Freising, Bavaria, Germany	MUC/EDDM	32,569,420	▼1	▲4.0%
17.	Barcelona	(Spain) Barcelona–El Prat Airport	El Prat de Llobregat, Barcelona, Catalonia, Spain	BCN/LEBL	32,316,655	▲2	▲11.1%
18.	Tokyo	(Japan) Narita International Airport	Narita, Chiba, Japan	NRT/RJAA	31,991,208	▼1	▲4.7%
19.	New York City	(United States) John F. Kennedy International Airport	Queens, New York City, New York, United States	JFK/KJFK	31,627,923	▼1	▲5.2%
20.	Rome	(Italy) Leonardo da Vinci–Fiumicino Airport	Fiumicino, Rome, Italy	FCO/LIRF	29,096,160	Steady	▲2.9%
21.	Dublin	(Republic of Ireland) Dublin Airport	Swords, County Dublin, Ireland	DUB/EIDW	28,764,506	▲4	▲14.9%
22.	Toronto	(Canada) Toronto Pearson International Airport	Mississauga, Ontario, Canada	YYZ/CYYZ	27,428,638	Steady	▲7.1%
23.	Zürich	(Switzerland) Zurich Airport	Kloten/Rümlang/Oberglatt, Bülach/Dielsdorf, ZH, Switzerland	ZRH/LSZH	27,413,593	Steady	▲3.1%
24.	Copenhagen	(Denmark) Copenhagen Airport	Tårnby, Hovedstaden, Denmark	CPH/EKCH	26,394,122	▼2	▲4.4%
25.	Abu Dhabi	(United Arab Emirates) Abu Dhabi International Airport	Abu Dhabi, United Arab Emirates	AUH/OMAA	25,964,178	▲3	▲9.7%
26.	Shanghai	(China) Shanghai Pudong International Airport	Pudong, Shanghai, China	PVG/ZSPD	24,865,920	Steady	▲6.8%

== 2015 statistics ==
Airports Council International's (January–December) figures are as follows.

Rank	Airport	Location	Code (IATA/ICAO)	Total passengers	Rank change	% change
1.	(United Arab Emirates) Dubai International Airport	Garhoud, Dubai, United Arab Emirates	DXB/OMDB	77,453,466	Steady	▲10.7%
2.	(United Kingdom) London Heathrow Airport	Hillingdon, Greater London, United Kingdom	LHR/EGLL	69,816,491	Steady	▲2.5%
3.	Hong Kong International Airport	Chek Lap Kok, New Territories, Hong Kong, China	HKG/VHHH	68,139,897	Steady	▲8.3%
4.	(France) Paris-Charles de Gaulle Airport	Roissy-en-France, Val d'Oise, Île-de-France, France	CDG/LFPG	60,369,798	Steady	▲3.0%
5.	(Netherlands) Amsterdam Airport Schiphol	Haarlemmermeer, North Holland, Netherlands	AMS/EHAM	58,245,545	Steady	▲6.0%
6.	Singapore Changi Airport	Changi, East Region, Singapore	SIN/WSSS	54,835,000	Steady	▲2.9%
7.	(Germany) Frankfurt Airport	Flughafen, Frankfurt, Hesse, Germany	FRA/EDDF	53,994,154	Steady	▲2.4%
8.	(South Korea) Seoul Incheon International Airport	Jung-gu, Incheon, South Korea	ICN/RKSI	48,720,319	Steady	▲8.5%
9.	(Thailand) Suvarnabhumi Airport	Racha Thewa, Bang Phli, Samut Prakan, Thailand	BKK/VTBS	43,251,807	▲1	▲16.3%
10.	(Turkey) Atatürk International Airport	Yeşilköy, Bakırköy, Istanbul, Turkey	IST/LTBA	41,998,251	▼1	▲11.1%
11.	(Taiwan) Taoyuan International Airport	Dayuan, Taoyuan, Taiwan	TPE/RCTP	38,103,889	Steady	▲7.6%
12.	(United Kingdom) London Gatwick Airport	Crawley, West Sussex, United Kingdom	LGW/EGKK	36,667,769	Steady	▲6.4%
13.	(Malaysia) Kuala Lumpur International Airport	Sepang, Selangor, Malaysia	KUL/WMKK	34,434,015	Steady	▲0.1%
14.	(Spain) Madrid-Barajas Airport	Madrid, Comunidad de Madrid, Spain	MAD/LEMD	33,787,171	▲2	▲14.1%
15.	(Germany) Munich Airport	Oberding/Hallbergmoos/Marzling, Erding/Freising, Bavaria, Germany	MUC/EDDM	31,313,329	▼1	▲3.5%
16.	(Qatar) Hamad International Airport	Doha, Qatar	DOH/OTBD	30,906,303	▲4	▲17.3%
17.	(Japan) Narita International Airport	Narita, Chiba, Japan	NRT/RJAA	30,547,564	▼2	▲3.2%
18.	(United States) John F. Kennedy International Airport	Queens, New York City, New York, United States	JFK/KJFK	30,017,244	▼1	▲6.2%
19.	(Spain) Barcelona–El Prat Airport	El Prat de Llobregat, Barcelona, Catalonia, Spain	BCN/LEBL	29,077,820	▼1	▲6,7%
20.	(Italy) Leonardo da Vinci–Fiumicino Airport	Fiumicino, Rome, Italy	FCO/LIRF	28,280,267	▼1	▲5.4%
21.	(Switzerland) Zurich Airport	Kloten/Rümlang/Oberglatt, Bülach/Dielsdorf, ZH, Switzerland	ZRH/LSZH	25,613,593	Steady	▲3.1%
22.	(Canada) Toronto Pearson International Airport	Mississauga, Ontario, Canada	YYZ/CYYZ	25,123,887	▲1	▲7.6%
23.	(Republic of Ireland) Dublin Airport	Swords, County Dublin, Ireland	DUB/EIDW	24,876,506	▲4	▲14.9%
24.	(Denmark) Copenhagen Airport	Tårnby, Hovedstaden, Denmark	CPH/EKCH	24,639,122	▼2	▲4.4%
25.	(China) Shanghai Pudong International Airport	Pudong, Shanghai, China	PVG/ZSPD	23,384,559	▲4	▲18.3%
26.	(United Arab Emirates) Abu Dhabi International Airport	Abu Dhabi, United Arab Emirates	AUH/OMAA	23,225,980	▲4	▲18.6%
27.	(Belgium) Brussels Airport	Zaventem, Flemish Brabant, Flanders, Belgium	BRU/EBBR	22,841,994	▼1	▲6.9%
28.	(Austria) Vienna International Airport	Vienna, Austria	VIE/LOWW	22,147,203	▼2	▲1.5%
29.	(United States) Miami International Airport	Miami-Dade County, Florida, United States	MIA/KMIA	21,206,557	▼1	▲5.5%
30.	(Turkey) Antalya Airport	Antalya, Turkey	AYT/LTAI	20,863,040	▼6	▼5.8%

== 2014 statistics ==
Airports Council International's (January–December) figures are as follows.

Rank	Airport	Location	Code (IATA/ICAO)	Total passengers	Rank change	% change
1.	(United Arab Emirates) Dubai International Airport	Garhoud, Dubai, United Arab Emirates	DXB/OMDB	69,954,392	▲1	▲6.2%
2.	(United Kingdom) London Heathrow Airport	Hillingdon, Greater London, United Kingdom	LHR/EGLL	68,091,095	▼1	▲1.9%
3.	Hong Kong International Airport	Chek Lap Kok, New Territories, Hong Kong, China	HKG/VHHH	62,929,420	Steady	▲6.2%
4.	(France) Paris-Charles de Gaulle Airport	Roissy-en-France, Val d'Oise, Île-de-France, France	CDG/LFPG	58,623,111	Steady	▲3.3%
5.	(Netherlands) Amsterdam Airport Schiphol	Haarlemmermeer, North Holland, Netherlands	AMS/EHAM	54,940,534	▲1	▲4.6%
6.	Singapore Changi Airport	Changi, East Region, Singapore	SIN/WSSS	54,093,070	▼1	▲1%
7.	(Germany) Frankfurt Airport	Flughafen, Frankfurt, Hesse, Germany	FRA/EDDF	52,713,013	Steady	▲2.7%
8.	(South Korea) Seoul Incheon International Airport	Jung-gu, Incheon, South Korea	ICN/RKSI	44,906,813	▲1	▲10.1%
9.	(Turkey) Atatürk International Airport	Yeşilköy, Bakırköy, Istanbul, Turkey	IST/LTBA	38,152,871	▲2	▲11.6%
10.	(Thailand) Suvarnabhumi Airport	Racha Thewa, Bang Phli, Samut Prakan, Thailand	BKK/VTBS	37,183,099	▼3	▼10%
11.	(Taiwan) Taoyuan International Airport	Dayuan, Taoyuan, Taiwan	TPE/RCTP	35,402,285	▲4	▲11.3%
12.	(United Kingdom) London Gatwick Airport	Crawley, West Sussex, United Kingdom	LGW/EGKK	34,438,531	▲3	▲8.8%
13.	(Malaysia) Kuala Lumpur International Airport	Sepang, Selangor, Malaysia	KUL/WMKK	34,431,775	▼1	▲5.6%
14.	(Germany) Munich Airport	Oberding/Hallbergmoos/Marzling, Erding/Freising, Bavaria, Germany	MUC/EDDM	30,269,007	▲1	▲3.6%
15.	(Japan) Narita International Airport	Narita, Chiba, Japan	NRT/RJAA	29,625,075	▼1	▼2.9%
16.	(Spain) Madrid-Barajas Airport	Madrid, Comunidad de Madrid, Spain	MAD/LEMD	29,618,803	▲1	▲6.9%
17.	(United States) John F. Kennedy International Airport	Queens, New York City, New York, United States	JFK/KJFK	28,471,427	▲1	▲7.3%
18.	(Spain) Barcelona–El Prat Airport	El Prat de Llobregat, Barcelona, Catalonia, Spain	BCN/LEBL	27,246,041	▲2	▲9%
19.	(Italy) Leonardo da Vinci–Fiumicino Airport	Fiumicino, Rome, Italy	FCO/LIRF	26,840,909	Steady	▲7.1%
20.	(Qatar) Hamad International Airport	Doha, Qatar	DOH/OTBD	26,356,392	▲2	▲13.3%
21.	(Switzerland) Zurich Airport	Rümlang/Oberglatt, Bülach/Dielsdorf, ZH, Switzerland	ZRH/LSZH	24,836,044	Steady	▲2.5%
22.	(Denmark) Copenhagen Airport	Tårnby, Hovedstaden, Denmark	CPH/EKCH	23,610,452	Steady	▲6.9%
23.	(Canada) Toronto Pearson International Airport	Mississauga, Ontario, Canada	YYZ/CYYZ	23,279,850	Steady	▲7.2%
24.	(Turkey) Antalya Airport	Antalya, Turkey	AYT/LTAI	22,072,307	▲3	▲2.2%
25.	(Austria) Vienna International Airport	Vienna, Austria	VIE/LOWW	21,831,400	▲1	▲2.2%
26.	(Belgium) Brussels Airport	Zaventem, Flemish Brabant, Flanders, Belgium	BRU/EBBR	21,718,462	▲3	▲14.7%
27.	(Republic of Ireland) Dublin Airport	Swords, County Dublin, Ireland	DUB/EIDW	21,635,155	▲1	▲7.7%
28.	(United States) Miami International Airport	Miami-Dade County, Florida, United States	MIA/KMIA	20,096,541	▼3	▼0.5%
29.	(China) Shanghai Pudong International Airport	Pudong, Shanghai, China	PVG/ZSPD	19,954,392	▲NEW	▲9.4%
30.	(United Arab Emirates) Abu Dhabi International Airport	Abu Dhabi, United Arab Emirates	AUH/OMAA	19,765,240	▲NEW	▲10.2%
31.	(United Kingdom) Manchester Airport	Manchester, Greater Manchester, United Kingdom	MAN/EGCC	19,484,972	▲NEW	▲5.7%

== 2013 statistics ==
Airports Council International's (January–December) figures are as follows.

Rank	Airport	Location	Code (IATA/ICAO)	Total passengers	Rank change	% change
1.	(United Kingdom) London Heathrow Airport	Hillingdon, Greater London, United Kingdom	LHR/EGLL	66,689,466	Steady	▲3.5%
2.	(United Arab Emirates) Dubai International Airport	Garhoud, Dubai, United Arab Emirates	DXB/OMDB	65,872,250	Steady	▲15.3%
3.	Hong Kong International Airport	Chek Lap Kok, New Territories, Hong Kong, China	HKG/VHHH	59,294,439	Steady	▲6.5%
4.	(France) Paris-Charles de Gaulle Airport	Roissy-en-France, Val d'Oise, Île-de-France, France	CDG/LFPG	56,767,748	Steady	▲1.0%
5.	Singapore Changi Airport	Changi, East Region, Singapore	SIN/WSSS	52,775,360	▲2	▲5.7%
6.	(Netherlands) Amsterdam Airport Schiphol	Haarlemmermeer, North Holland, Netherlands	AMS/EHAM	52,527,699	▼1	▲3.0%
7.	(Germany) Frankfurt Airport	Flughafen, Frankfurt, Hesse, Germany	FRA/EDDF	51,315,550	▼1	▲1.1%
8.	(Thailand) Suvarnabhumi Airport	Racha Thewa, Bang Phli, Samut Prakan, Thailand	BKK/VTBS	41,302,852	Steady	▲4.9%
9.	(South Korea) Seoul Incheon International Airport	Jung-gu, Incheon, Sudogwon, South Korea	ICN/RKSI	40,785,953	Steady	▲6.4%
10.	(Turkey) Atatürk International Airport	Yeşilköy, Bakırköy, Istanbul, Turkey	IST/LTBA	34,079,118	Steady	▲14.2%
11.	(Malaysia) Kuala Lumpur International Airport	Sepang, Selangor, Malaysia	KUL/WMKK	32,605,356	▲1	▲18.1%
12.	(United Kingdom) London Gatwick Airport	Crawley, West Sussex, United Kingdom	LGW/EGKK	31,657,805	▼1	▲4.2%
13.	(Japan) Narita International Airport	Narita, Chiba, Japan	NRT/RJAA	30,516,135	Steady	▲3.0%
14.	(Germany) Munich Airport	Oberding/Hallbergmoos/Marzling, Erding/Freising, Bavaria, Germany	MUC/EDDM	29,216,808	Steady	▲2.1%
15.	(Taiwan) Taoyuan International Airport	Dayuan, Taoyuan, Taiwan	TPE/RCTP	28,608,274	▲1	▲10.2%
16.	(Spain) Madrid-Barajas Airport	Madrid, Comunidad de Madrid, Spain	MAD/LEMD	27,711,197	▼1	▼9.5%
17.	(United States) John F. Kennedy International Airport	Queens, New York City, New York, United States	JFK/KJFK	26,530,698	Steady	▲5.9%
18.	(Italy) Leonardo da Vinci–Fiumicino Airport	Fiumicino, Rome, Italy	FCO/LIRF	25,069,617	Steady	▲0.6%
19.	(Spain) Barcelona–El Prat Airport	El Prat de Llobregat, Barcelona, Catalonia, Spain	BCN/LEBL	25,003,256	Steady	▲5.8%
20.	(Switzerland) Zurich Airport	Kloten, ZH, Switzerland	ZRH/LSZH	24,227,178	Steady	▲0.4%
21.	(Qatar) Doha International Airport	Doha, Qatar	DOH/OTBD	23,266,396	Steady	▲9.9%
22.	(Denmark) Copenhagen Airport	Tårnby, Hovedstaden, Denmark	CPH/EKCH	22,096,855	Steady	▲3.7%
23.	(Canada) Toronto Pearson International Airport	Mississauga, Ontario, Canada	YYZ/CYYZ	21,638,571	Steady	▲1.8%
24.	(Turkey) Antalya Airport	Antalya, Turkey	AYT/LTAI	21,492,138	▲1	▲6.8%
25.	(Austria) Vienna International Airport	Vienna, Austria	VIE/LOWW	21,357,730	▼1	▼0.7%
26	(United States) Miami International Airport	Miami-Dade County, Florida, United States	MIA/KMIA	20,201,626	Steady	▲4.3%
27.	(Republic of Ireland) Dublin Airport	Swords, County Dublin, Ireland	DUB/EIDW	20,092,659	Steady	▲5.6%
28.	(Belgium) Brussels Airport	Zaventem, Flemish Brabant, Flanders, Belgium	BRU/EBBR	18,932,137	Steady	▲0.8%
29.	(Russia) Sheremetyevo International Airport	Khimki, Moscow Oblast, Russia	SVO/UUEE	18,581,906	▲NEW	▲8.3%

== 2011 statistics ==
Airports Council International's (January–December) figures are as follows.

Rank	Airport	Location	Code (IATA/ICAO)	Total passengers	Rank change	% change
1.	(United Kingdom) London Heathrow Airport	Hillingdon, Greater London, United Kingdom	LHR/EGLL	64,687,737	Steady	▲6.2%
2.	(France) Paris-Charles de Gaulle Airport	Roissy-en-France, Val d'Oise, Île-de-France, France	CDG/LFPG	55,674,880	Steady	▲4.8%
3.	Hong Kong International Airport	Chek Lap Kok, New Territories, Hong Kong, China	HKG/VHHH	52,749,262	Steady	▲6.0%
4.	(United Arab Emirates) Dubai International Airport	Garhoud, Dubai, United Arab Emirates	DXB/OMDB	50,192,013	▲1	▲8.4%
5.	(Netherlands) Amsterdam Airport Schiphol	Haarlemmermeer, North Holland, Netherlands	AMS/EHAM	49,680,283	▲1	▲10.1%
6.	(Germany) Frankfurt Airport	Flughafen, Frankfurt, Hesse, Germany	FRA/EDDF	49,477,184	▼2	▲6.9%
7.	Singapore Changi Airport	Changi, East Region, Singapore	SIN/WSSS	45,429,263	Steady	▲11.0%
8.	(Thailand) Suvarnabhumi Airport	Racha Thewa, Bang Phli, Samut Prakan, Thailand	BKK/VTBS	35,009,002	▲3	▲11.4%
9.	(South Korea) Seoul Incheon International Airport	Jung-gu, Incheon, Sudogwon, South Korea	ICN/RKSI	34,537,845	▼1	▲4.8%
10.	(Spain) Madrid-Barajas Airport	Madrid, Comunidad de Madrid, Spain	MAD/LEMD	32,449,857	Steady	▲4.7%
11.	(United Kingdom) London Gatwick Airport	Crawley, West Sussex, United Kingdom	LGW/EGKK	29,923,391	▲1	▲7.5%
12.	(Germany) Munich Airport	Oberding/Hallbergmoos/Marzling, Erding/Freising, Bavaria, Germany	MUC/EDDM	27,879,045	▲1	▲10.1%
13.	(Japan) Narita International Airport	Narita, Chiba, Japan	NRT/RJAA	26,331,010	▼4	▼18.1%
14.	(Malaysia) Kuala Lumpur International Airport	Sepang, Selangor, Malaysia	KUL/WMKK	25,915,723	▲4	▲10.7%
15.	(Italy) Leonardo da Vinci Airport	Fiumicino, Rome, Italy	FCO/LIRF	24,448,925	Steady	▲5.0%
16.	(United States) John F. Kennedy International Airport	Queens, New York City, New York, United States	JFK/KJFK	24,164,827	Steady	▲4.6%
17.	(Turkey) Atatürk International Airport	Yeşilköy, Bakırköy, Istanbul, Turkey	IST/LTBA	23,973,158	Steady	▲32.2%
18.	(Switzerland) Zurich Airport	Rümlang/Oberglatt, Bülach/Dielsdorf, ZH, Switzerland	ZRH/LSZH	23,628,718	▲1	▲6.6%
19.	(Taiwan) Taoyuan International Airport	Dayuan, Taoyuan, Taiwan	TPE/RCTP	23,137,062	▼5	0.0%
20.	(Spain) Barcelona Airport	El Prat de Llobregat, Barcelona, Catalonia, Spain	BCN/LEBL	21,663,602	▲6	▲23.5%
21.	(Turkey) Antalya Airport	Antalya, Turkey	AYT/LTAI	20,511,172	▲2	▲13.6%
22.	(Austria) Vienna Airport	Vienna, Austria	VIE/LOWW	20,398,766	▲NEW	▲8.0%
23.	(Canada) Toronto Pearson International Airport	Mississauga, Ontario, Canada	YYZ/CYYZ	20,355,771	▼3	▲6.0%
24.	(Denmark) Copenhagen Airport	Tårnby, Hovedstaden, Denmark	CPH/EKCH	20,233,904	▼3	▲6.7%
25.	(Republic of Ireland) Dublin Airport	Swords, County Dublin, Republic of Ireland	DUB/EIDW	18,607,651	▼1	▲3.1%
26.	(Belgium) Brussels Airport	Zaventem, Flemish Brabant, Flanders, Belgium	BRU/EBBR	18,590,891	▲3	▲9.6%
27	(United States) Miami International Airport	Miami-Dade County, Florida, United States	MIA/KMIA	18,417,513	▲1	▲9.0%
28.	(Qatar) Doha International Airport	Doha, Qatar	DOH/OTBD	18,108,521	▲NEW	▲15.2%
29.	(Italy) Malpensa Airport	Somma Lombardo, Varese, Lombardy, Italy	MXP/LIMC	17,551,677	▼4	▲1.3%
30.	(United Kingdom) Manchester Airport	Manchester, Greater Manchester, United Kingdom	MAN/EGCC	16,605,737	▲NEW	▲7.7%

== See also ==
- List of busiest airports by passenger traffic
- List of busiest airports by cargo traffic
- List of busiest airports by aircraft movements
- List of international airports by country
- Airport of entry
