= Flughafen (Frankfurt am Main) =

Frankfurt-Flughafen
- Quarter of Frankfurt am Main
- Location of Flughafen (red) and the Ortsbezirk Süd (light red) within Frankfurt am Main
- Interactive map of Frankfurt-Flughafen
- Location within Germany Location within Hesse
- Coordinates: 50°03′40″N 08°33′51″E
- Country: Germany
- State: Hesse
- Admin. region: Darmstadt
- District: Urban district
- City: Frankfurt am Main

Area
  - Total: 20 km^{2} (7.7 sq mi)
- Time zone: UTC+01:00 (CET)
  - Summer (DST): UTC+02:00 (CEST)
- Postal codes: 60549
- Dialling codes: 069
- Vehicle registration: F

Frankfurt-Flughafen (German pronunciation: [ˈfluːkˌhaːfn̩], lit. 'Airport') is a quarter of Frankfurt am Main, Germany. It is part of the Ortsbezirk Süd and is subdivided into the Stadtbezirke Unterwald and Flughafen.

Frankfurt-Flughafen contains the whole airport ground of Frankfurt Airport after which the district is named. With only 218 inhabitants it is the least populated (and least densely populated) district but with 71,500 people employed at about 500 airport companies (2010) it is also the district with the most employees. Due to its statistical anomalies, it also enjoys the highest per capita income in the city. Frankfurt-Flughafen is the second largest district by area after Sachsenhausen. It is entirely surrounded by the Frankfurt City Forest.

Frankfurt-Flughafen does not lack infrastructure: Within the district are two train stations (Frankfurt Airport regional station and Frankfurt Airport long-distance station), several hotels, a hospital, places of worship for all major religious groups, many restaurants (including Europe's largest McDonald's) and shops.

== Economy ==
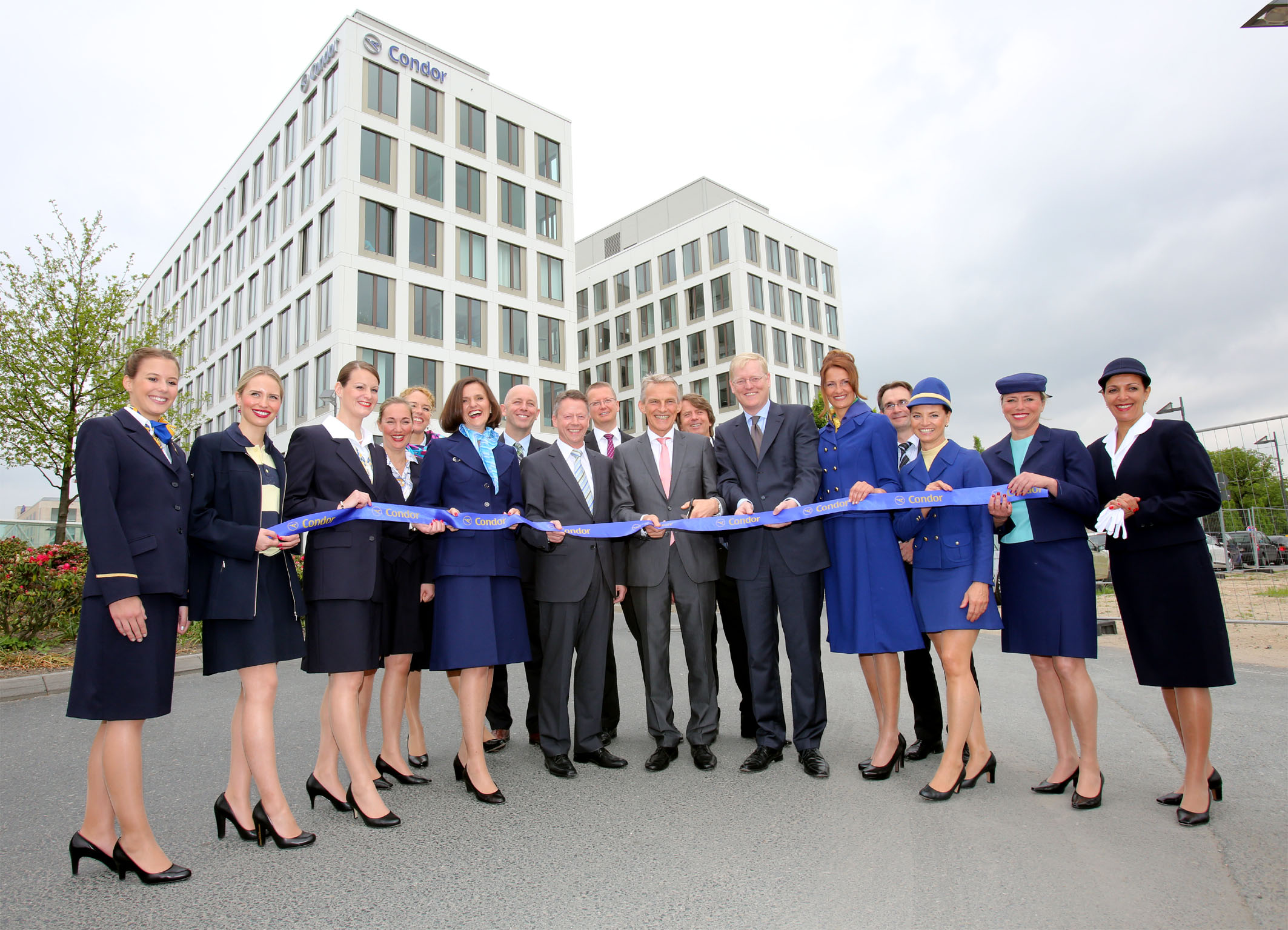
Gateway Gardens, head office of Condor Airlines and SunExpress Deutschland

Several companies have their head office or offices within the area, e.g. Fraport (the airport operator), Lufthansa, Condor and the Star Alliance.

The airport ground and the surrounding area of Frankfurt Airport offer a large variety of on-airport businesses as well as airport-related businesses, like office space, hotels, shopping areas, conference rooms and car parks. The development of an airport city has significantly increased in recent years.

=== Sheraton Hotel & Conference Center ===
Sheraton Hotels and Resorts offers 1,008 guest rooms adjacent to Terminal 1 and a conference center for up to 200 delegates.

=== Frankfurt Airport Centers ===
The Frankfurt Airport Center 1 (FAC 1) near Terminal 1 offers office and conference facilities, the newer FAC 2 is located within Terminal 2 and offers office space for airlines.

=== Airport City Mall ===
The Airport City Mall is located on the landside of Terminal 1, departure hall B. It offers national and international retailers and label stores, a supermarket and several restaurants.

=== The Squaire ===
The Squaire is an office building with a total floor area of 140,000 m^{2} (1,506,900 sq ft). It is directly connected to Terminal 1 through a connecting corridor for pedestrians. The accounting firm KPMG, Lufthansa and two Hilton Hotels (Hilton Garden Inn Frankfurt Airport with 334 rooms and Hilton Frankfurt Airport with 249 rooms) occupy space in The Squaire.

=== Main Airport Center ===
The Main Airport Center, named after the Main river, is an office building with ten floors and about 51,000 m^{2} (549,000 sq ft) of office space. It is located at the edge of the Frankfurt City Forrest near Terminal 2.

=== Gateway Gardens ===
Gateway Gardens, across the Bundesautobahn 3 from Frankfurt Airport, close to Terminal 2, is a former housing area for the United States Air Force personnel based at the Rhein-Main Air Base. Prior to its redevelopment, the land of Gateway Gardens housed residences of families stationed at a U.S. military base. Like the air base, the housing area was closed in 2005. Since then the area is being developed into a business location for airport-related companies. Lufthansa moved its airline catering subsidiary LSG Sky Chefs to Gateway Gardens, Condor Flugdienst and SunExpress Deutschland are headquartered here. DB Schenker, the logistics company of Deutsche Bahn, is currently building a 66 m (217 ft) high-rise building.

In January 2010 Condor held a groundbreaking for Gateway Gardens. Ralf Teckentrup, the CEO of Condor, said that the new headquarters would place the airline's operations closer to Frankfurt Airport. 380 ground employees were to work in the building, and pre-flight briefings for about 2,000 flight attendants will be held in the building.

Groß & Partner and OFB Projektentwicklung developed the seven-floor facility. The 14,600-square-metre (157,000 sq ft) building is situated between the park and the central plaza, in the "Quartier Mondo" area of Gateway Gardens. It houses Condor's corporate headquarters, a training and education center with a flight simulator, and the airline's flight operations facility. 2,700 square metres (29,000 sq ft) of the facility includes small units rented to other tenants and a café and restaurant on the building's first floor. The building opened in the spring of 2012.

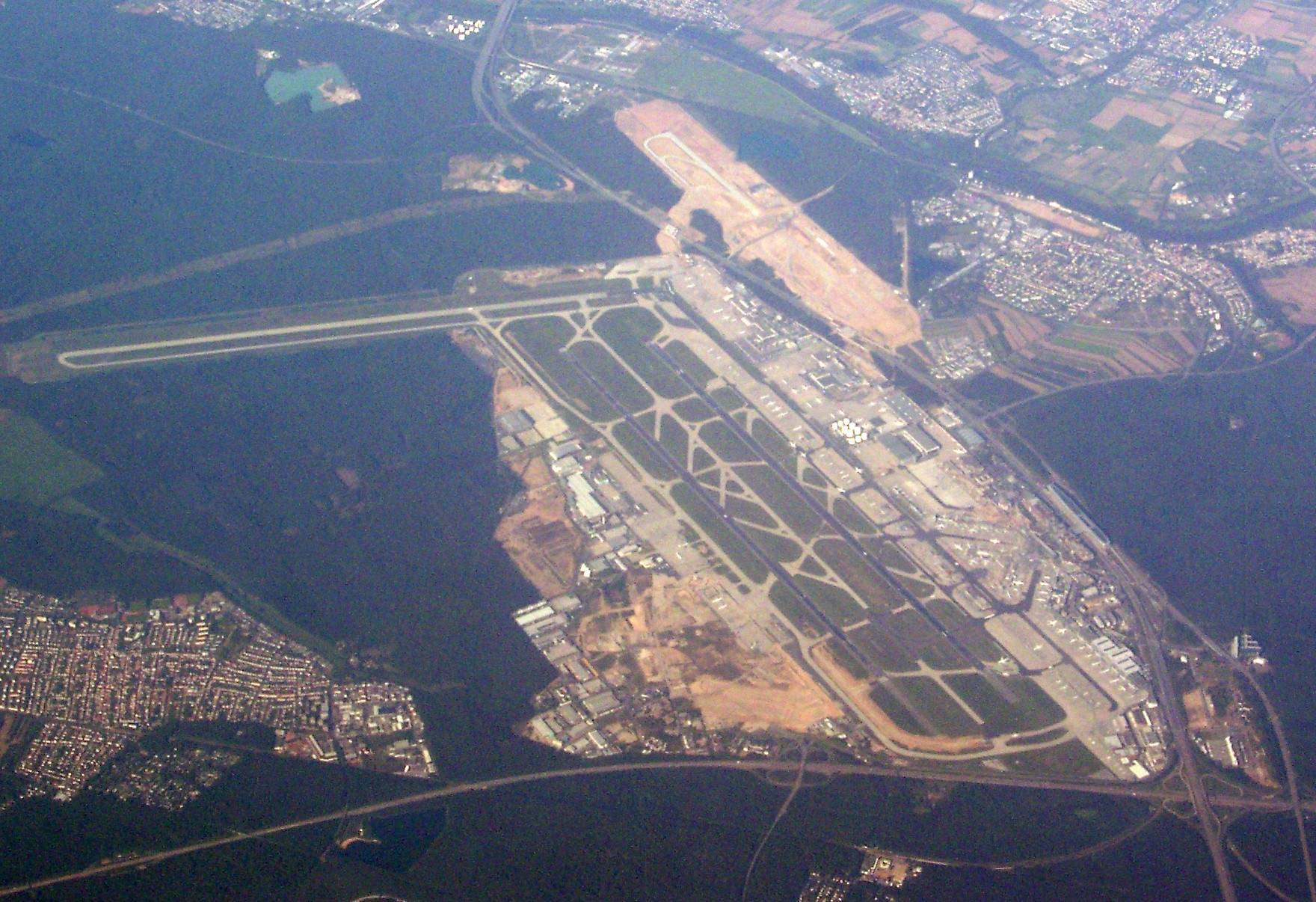
Frankfurt Airport from the air (2010)

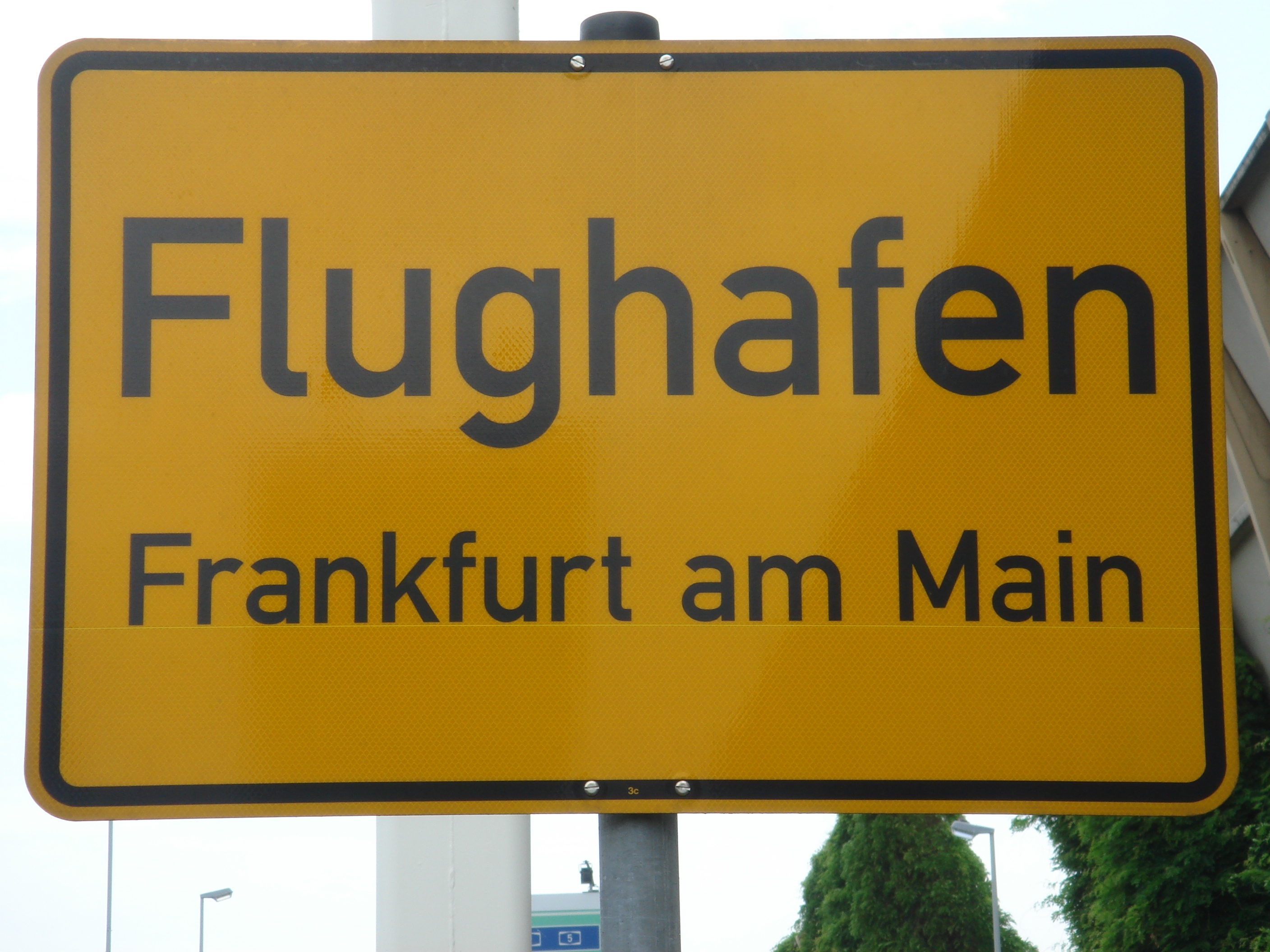
Welcome sign to the district

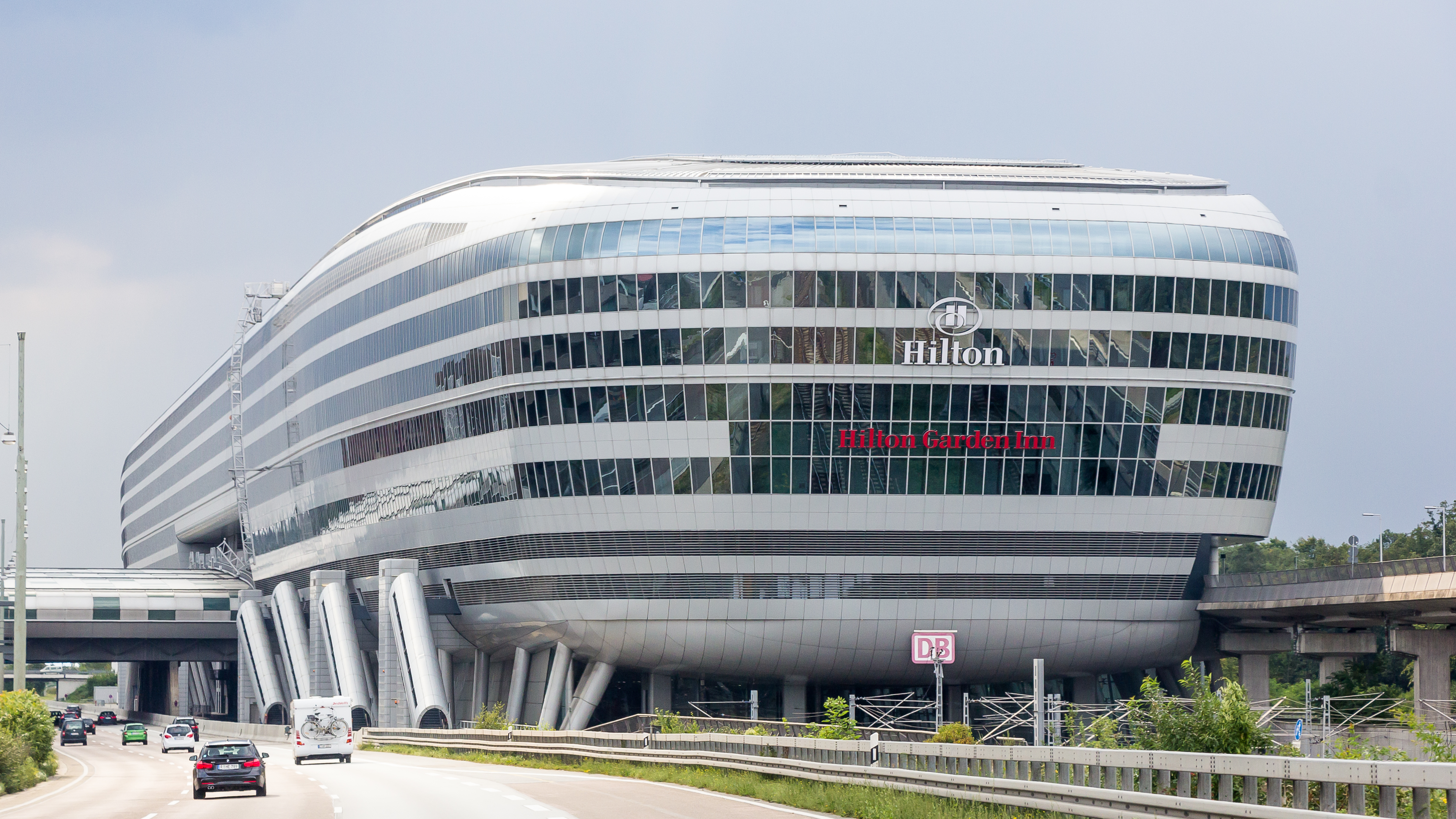
Office building The Squaire

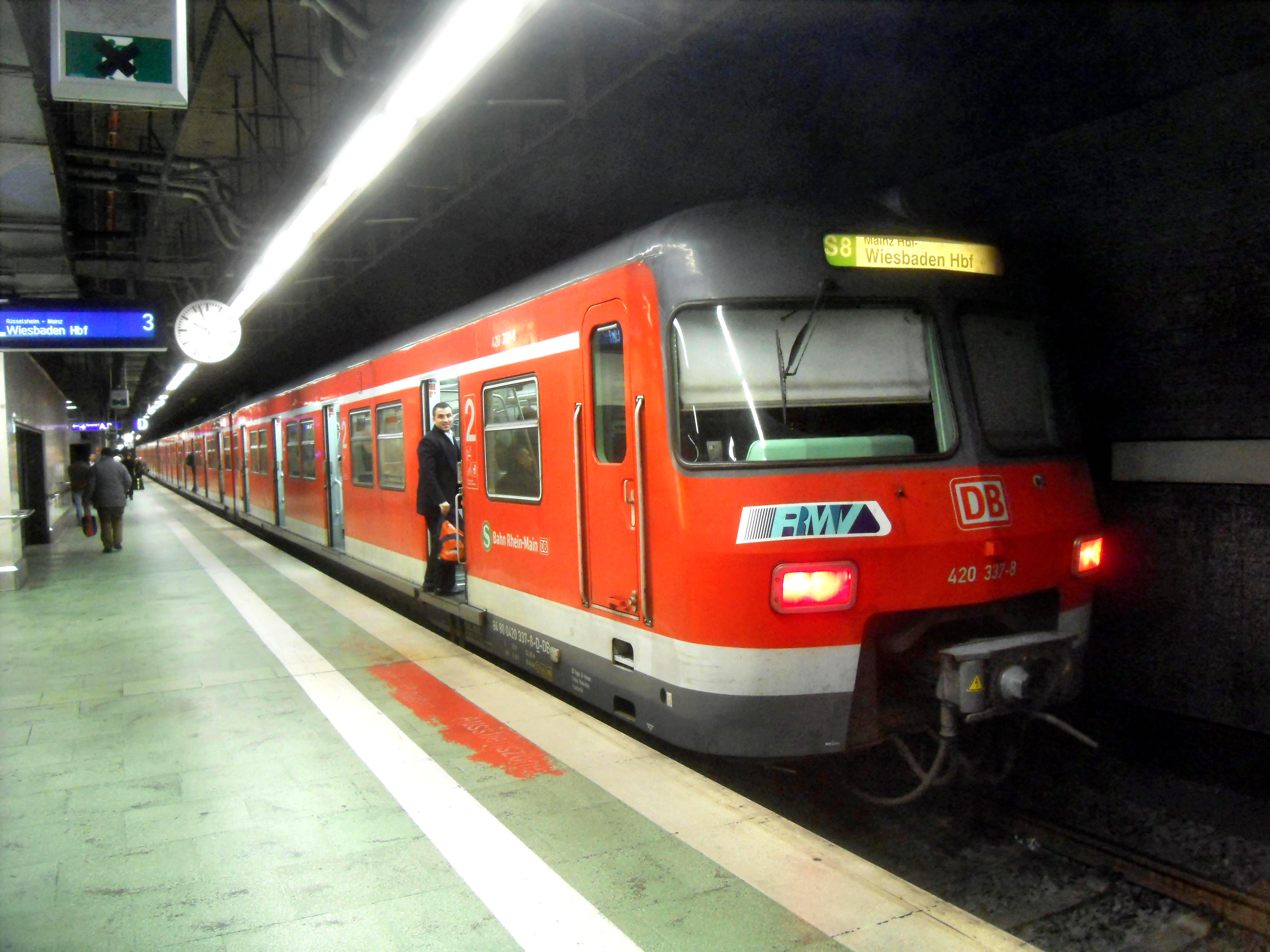
Frankfurt Airport regional station
