= Frankfurt Airport (disambiguation) =

Frankfurt Airport (IATA: FRA) is the busiest airport in Germany, located in Frankfurt am Main, Hesse.

Frankfurt Airport may also refer to:

- Frankfurt Egelsbach Airport, a general aviation airport, located in Egelsbach, Hesse, near Frankfurt am Main Airport.
- Frankfurt-Hahn Airport (IATA: HHN), a converted U.S. air base, located in Kirchberg, Rhineland-Palatinate, which is popular with low-cost airlines.
- Frankfurt am Main-Flughafen, a city district of Frankfurt am Main, Hesse.
