= Charles Bidwell =

American sociologist

Charles Edward Bidwell (1932–2016, in Chicago, US) was a sociologist and the William Claude Reavis Professor Emeritus at the University of Chicago. He is best known for his contributions to the sociology of education. His research topics included the formal and informal organization of schools, the role of schools in society, and how their role has changed over time. Bidwell was editor of the American Journal of Sociology, the Sociology of Education, and the American Journal of Education. In 2007, he received the Willard Waller Award in recognition of his career of distinguished scholarship.

== Selected publications ==
- "The Collegial Focus and Student Achievement: Consequences of High School Faculty Social Organization for Students . Achievement in Mathematics and Science," Sociology of Education 74 (July, 2001):181-209. (With Jeffrey Yasumoto and Kazuaki Uekawa)
- "School as Context and Construction: A Social Psychological Approach to the Study of Schooling." In Handbook of the Sociology of Education, ed. Maureen T. Hallinan. New York: Kluwer Academic/Plenum, 2000.
- Structuring in Organizations: Ecosystem Theory Evaluated. Greenwich CT and London, England: JAI Press, 1988. (With John D. Kasarda)
- "The Sociology of Education" in Neil J. Smelser (ed.) Handbook of Sociology, Beverly Hills, Ca. Sage Publishing Co, 1988, pp. 449–471. (With Noah Friedkin)
- The Organization and its Ecosystem: A Theory of Structuring in Organizations. Greenwich, Conn. and London, England: JAI Press, 1985. (With John D. Kasarda)
- "The School as a Formal Organization." In Handbook of Organizations, ed. James G. March. Chicago: Rand McNally, 1965.
