= Hilton Frankfurt Airport =

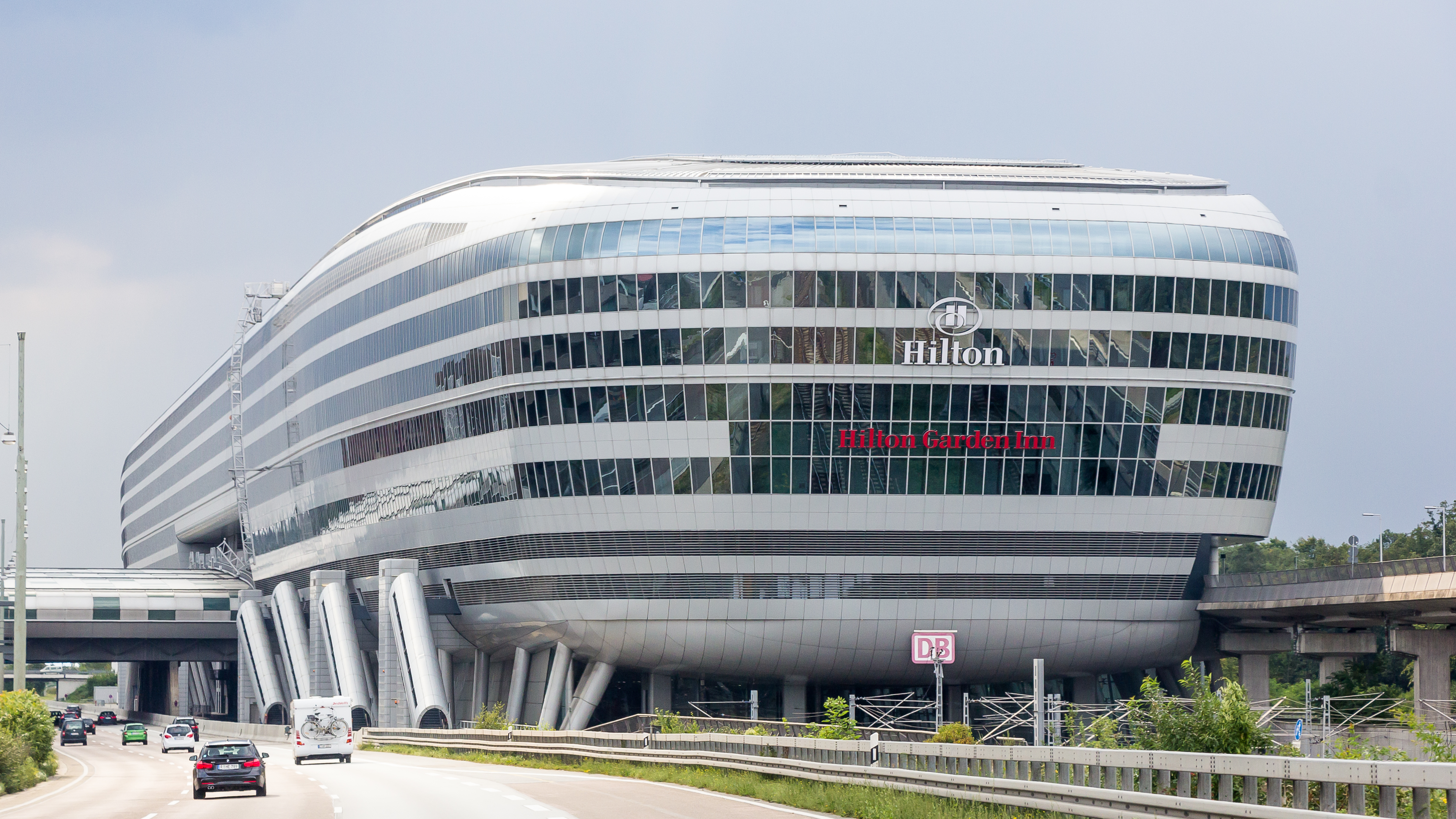
- The Squaire contains both the Hilton and a Hilton Garden Inn
- Interactive map of the Hilton Frankfurt Airport area

General information
- Type: Hotel
- Architectural style: Modern
- Location: The Squaire Am Flughafen, Frankfurt am Main, Germany
- Coordinates: 50°03′12.5″N 8°34′22.1″E
- Opening: 2011
- Owner: Hilton Worldwide

Other information
- Number of rooms: 249

Website
- hilton.com

Hilton Frankfurt Airport is a four-star hotel, located in the groundscraper The Squaire in Frankfurt, Germany. The hotel was officially opened in December 2011 and is part of the Hilton Hotels & Resorts chain. It is situated directly above the Intercity Express (ICE) long-distance railway station and has a skywalk to Terminal 1 of Frankfurt Airport and connection to Frankfurter Kreuz, the intersection of the A3 and A5 motorways.

== Description ==
The hotel is one of two Hilton hotels located on the premises of The Squaire building, occupying a total area of 34,500 sq m. Hilton Frankfurt Airport hotel incorporates 249 guestrooms and suites and two executive floors with a lounge, a business centre and 11 meeting rooms. John D. Kasarda has referred to the hotel as one of "the most popular places to hold business meetings in Germany". The hotel's interior is designed by the company JOI-Design from Hamburg.

== Acccolades ==
- Hilton Frankfurt Airport was presented with the award for Best Airport Hotel Europe at the Skytrax World Airport Awards Gala, held on 26 March 2014 in Barcelona.
- The hotel has also been voted "Best Airport Hotel in the World" by Business Traveler magazine North America and awarded "Europe's Leading Airport Hotel" at the World Travel Awards.
- The Hilton Frankfurt Airport hotel has received the "Best Airport Hotel in Germany", "Best Airport Hotel in Europe" and "Best International Airport Hotel" awards in two consecutive years.
