= Aerotropolis =

Airport-centered metropolitan subregion

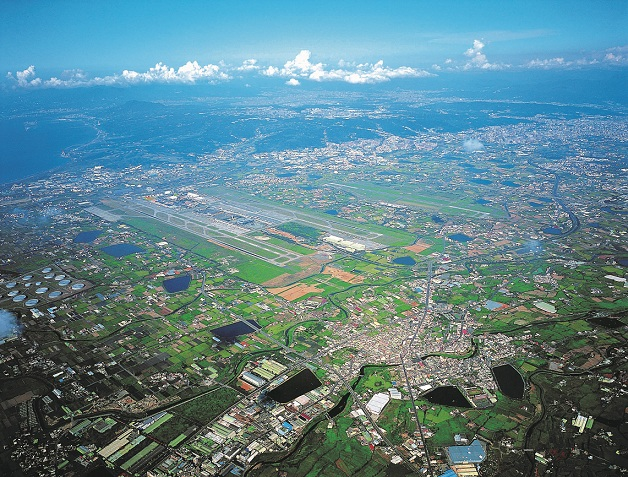
Taoyuan Aerotropolis is an example of a large urban planning development at the Taiwan Taoyuan International Airport in Taoyuan City, Taiwan.

An aerotropolis is a metropolitan subregion whose infrastructure, land use, and economy are centered on an airport. It fuses the terms "aero-" (aviation) and "metropolis" and is similar to the concept described as an airport city. Like the traditional metropolis made up of a central city core and its outlying commuter-linked suburbs, the aerotropolis consists of 1) the airport's aeronautical, logistics, and commercial infrastructure forming a multimodal, multifunctional airport city at its core and 2) outlying corridors and clusters of businesses and associated residential developments that feed off each other and their accessibility to the airport. The word aerotropolis was first used by New York commercial artist Nicholas DeSantis, whose drawing of a skyscraper rooftop airport in the city was presented in the November 1939 issue of Popular Science. The term was repurposed by air commerce researcher and industry business consultant John D. Kasarda in 2000 based on his prior research on airport-driven economic development.

== Airports, connectivity, and development ==
According to Kasarda, airports have evolved as drivers of business location and urban development in the 21st century in the same way as highways did in the 20th century, railroads in the 19th century, and seaports in the 18th century. The engine of the aerotropolis is the airport and its air routes, which offer firms speedy connectivity to their suppliers, customers, and enterprise partners. Some aerotropolis businesses are more dependent on distant suppliers or customers halfway around the world than those located nearby. As economies become increasingly globalized, time-sensitive, and reliant on air commerce for trade in goods and services, the speed and agility aviation provides to long-distance movement of people and goods generate competitive advantages for firms and places. In the aerotropolis model, time and cost of connectivity replace space and distance as the primary metrics shaping development, with "economies of speed" becoming as salient for the competitiveness of firms and places as economies of scale and economies of scope. In this model, it is not how far but how fast widely separated firms and places can connect.

The aerotropolis encompasses aviation-dependent businesses and the commercial services that support them and the multitude of air travelers who pass through the airport annually. These businesses include, among others, high-tech and advanced manufacturing, logistics, and e-commerce fulfillment; high-value perishables and biomeds; destination retail, sports, entertainment, and medical/wellness complexes; hotels; conference centers, trade, and exhibition centers; and offices for businesspeople who travel frequently by air or engage in global commerce. Business parks, logistics parks, R&D parks, time-critical distribution centers, and information technology complexes as well as hotels, conference, and entertainment venues are most frequently visible around major new airports on metropolitan peripheries where there is sufficient land and along the transportation corridors radiating from them. As increasing numbers of aviation-oriented firms and commercial service providers cluster around and outward from airports, the aerotropolis is becoming a major urban destination where air travelers and locals alike work, shop, meet, exchange knowledge, conduct business, eat, sleep, and are entertained, often without going more than 15 minutes from the airport. The outcome is a new form of transit-oriented development centered on runways and along their connecting surface transportation arteries.

The aerotropolis is more, though, than clusters and corridors of airport-linked commercial, industrial, and logistics facilities. It also consists of living urban places that must be planned and designed as appealing environmental and social realms.

Some aerotropolises have arisen spontaneously, responding to organic market forces with a lack of urban planning, contributing to sprawl while creating highway congestion, pollution, and other negative externalities. Applying principles of smart urban growth and sustainability are essential to the formation of a successful aerotropolis, as is stakeholder alignment. Governance entities aligning airport management, airport-surrounding communities, and city and regional officials with local business and economic development leaders should implement aerotropolis planning to achieve greater economic efficiencies along with more attractive and sustainable development.

== Criticisms of the concept ==
A major criticism is the question of whether oil will stay relatively inexpensive and widely available in the future or whether a downturn in global oil production ("peak oil") will adversely affect aviation and thus the aerotropolis. Others have criticized the aerotropolis model for overstating the number and types of goods that travel by air. While many types of high-value goods like electronics tend to be shipped by air, larger, bulkier items like cars and grain do not. Those who point this out suggest that the relationship between seaports, airports, and rail facilities should be studied in more depth. Further criticisms of the aerotropolis include loss of farmland and forests, eviction and/or the exclusion of local residents and communities from the economic benefits of the aerotropolis, and locking in high-carbon infrastructure for decades to come.

Social critics argue that the aerotropolis favors the interests of business over that of people and that its mixed-use commercial/residential developments typically lack urban ambience. Some have questioned why people would ever want to live next to an airport, given aircraft noise. Still, others claim that while there are cases where the aerotropolis concept has worked well (e.g., Amsterdam Schiphol and Dallas-Fort Worth airport areas), it has often failed to live up to expectations when applied elsewhere.
