= IVG Immobilien =

German real estate company

IVG Immobilien AG
- Type: Aktiengesellschaft
- Traded as: FWB: IVG
- Industry: Real estate
- Founded: 2002
- Headquarters: Bonn, Germany
- Key people: Ralf Jung (CEO), Dietmar Binkowska (Chairman of the supervisory board)
- Products: Investment in and development of commercial property and underground hydrocarbon storage caverns
- Operating income: €256.2 million (2010)
- Net income: ▼ (€8.8 million) (2010)
- Total assets: €7.292 billion (end 2010)
- Total equity: €1.286 billion (end 2010)
- Number of employees: 551 (FTE, end 2012)
- Website: www.ivg.de

IVG Immobilien (formerly known as IndustrieVerwaltungsGesellschaft mbH) is a German real estate company headquartered in Bonn, Germany. It is a leading commercial property owner in Germany and other European countries.

== Activities ==
The core business of IVG Immobilien AG is the acquisition and management of commercial properties in Germany. It holds a private portfolio worth around €3.5 billion and is the largest holder of income-producing office properties in Germany.

== Investments ==
=== Storage caverns ===
The investment company IVG Caverns GmbH focuses on the construction of caverns for the storage of crude oil and natural gas, as well as their operation and leasing. Cavern lessees are companies in the energy sector and state oil storage organizations.

=== Institutional funds ===
The investment company IVG Institutional Funds GmbH is a provider and manager of structured real estate products for institutional investors with assets under management of around €11 billion as an integrated investment platform with a Europe-wide network of branches, the company offers services within the structuring and Management of real estate investment products. IVG Institutional Funds focuses primarily on commercial properties in the office, retail and logistics sectors in Europe.

=== Brownfield sites ===
As the successor of the former mining business, IVG also owns several brownfield sites. By agreement with the state of Lower Saxony, in April 2014, IVG is obliged to restore or remove such contamination. For this purpose, IVG will provide €2 million annually over the next 15 years for testing and remediation.

== History ==
IVG was founded in 1916 as a "Montanindustrie" - coal and steel industry - enterprise. In 1951 it was converted into an industrial company whose sole shareholder was the Federal Republic of Germany through the Federal Ministry of Finance. In 1986 the company was converted to a public company and partially privatized. In 1993 IVG was full privatized though a stock market offering.

In 1996, IVG was renamed IVG Holding AG and from 1997 focused on office and commercial property development and ownership. In 2002, after disposing of non-real estate businesses, it was renamed IVG Immobilien AG.

In April 2004, IVG acquired 50.1 percent of Oppenheim Real Estate Investment Company Ltd. (OIC) and, in 2005, IVG acquired 33 gas storage caverns owned by the Federal Republic of Germany in Etzel, near Wilhelmshaven. IVG's interest in OIC increased to 94 percent in 2006/2007 and OIC was renamed IVG Institutional Funds GmbH and integrated into the former IVG Funds.

On 21 February 2007, IVG Immobilien AG and UK investment firm Evans Randall completed their joint purchase of the Gherkin building in London for GB£630 million, making it Britain's most expensive office building. Gherkin went into receivership in April 2014 due to mortgage defaults that stretch back to 2009. The accountancy firm Deloitte has been appointed receiver and says it will conduct a sale of the building.

== Management history ==
From 1995 to 2006, Eckart John von Freyend was IVG's CEO. At the end of his contract on July 1, 2006, he was appointed to the supervisory board of the company, where he remained until April 2010. His successor as CEO of IVG Immobilien AG was Wolf Leichnitz. On September 30, 2008, Leichnitz resigned for personal reasons. Leichnitz was followed on November 1, 2008, by Gerhard Niesslein as executive chair of the company. After Niesslein had unexpectedly not renewed his contract, which expired at the end of October 2011, Wolfgang Schäfer, the former CFO, followed as chief executive officer on November 1, 2011.

== 2013-2014 insolvency proceedings ==
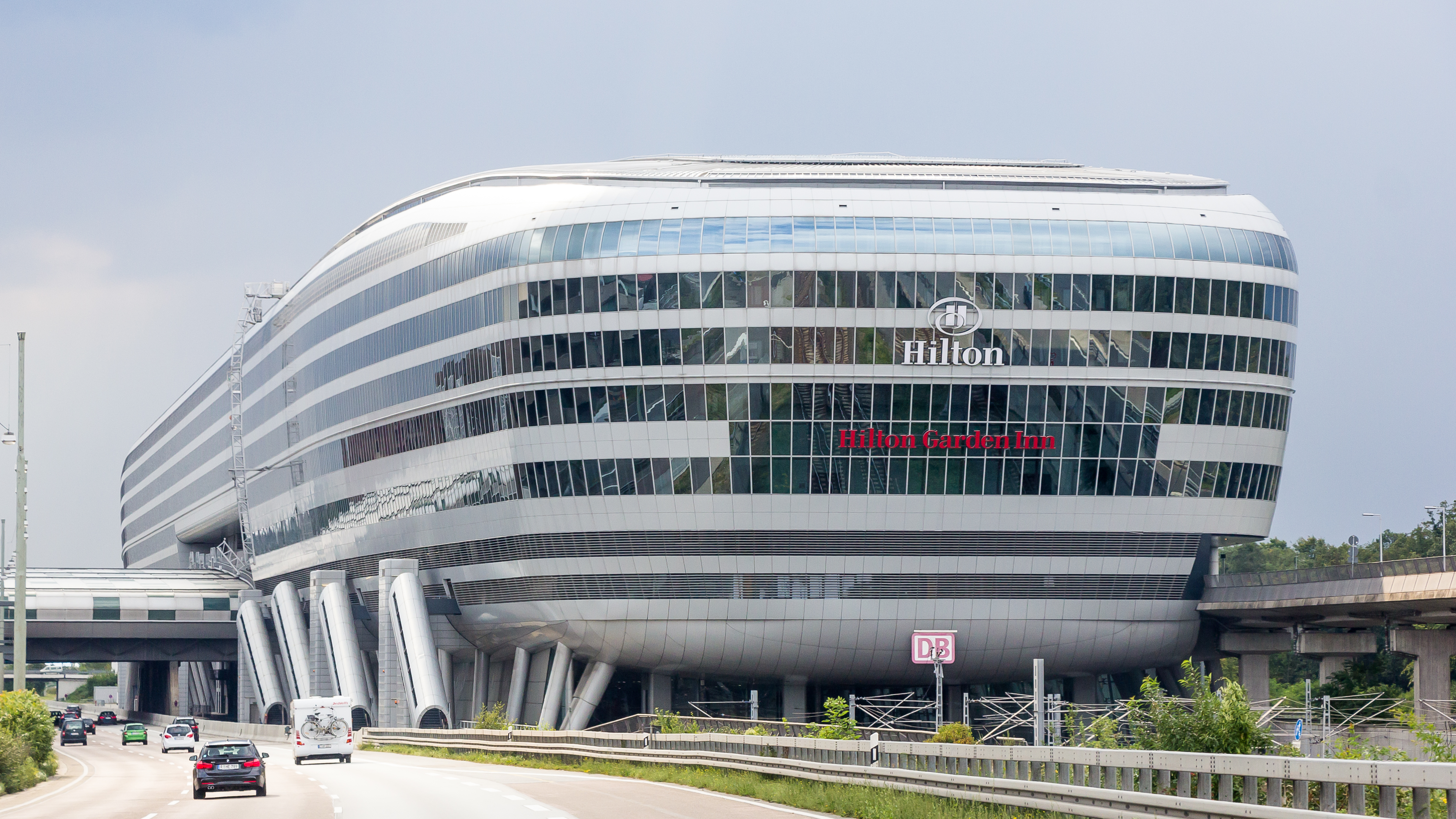
The Squaire (Frankfurt Airport, next to Bundesautobahn 3)

In the summer of 2013, the company fought the threat of bankruptcy. IVG's stock market capitalization had fallen to around €54 million. Write-downs on its property portfolio, breakdowns in project development and especially the construction cost overruns for the Squaire project at Frankfurt Airport were the primary cause of IVG's insolvency.

In August, the group announced that €350 million would be written off the value of IVG's assets, reducing the share capital by more than half. On August 11, 2013, major creditor groups agreed to a restructuring plan and to provide a bridge financing, to be initially secured by the assets of the company. However, not all stakeholders gave the required consent, making a nonjudicial restructuring impossible.

On August 21, 2013, the executive board of the company sought insolvency protection. On November 1, 2013, the Amtsgericht Bonn granted the request of the company to initiate protection proceedings under self-administration. IVG had, as of August 2013, around €4.2 billion of debt and assets under management of more than €20 billion. On March 20, 2014, the majority of the parties (creditors and shareholders) agreed at the insolvency court in Bonn to the insolvency plan prepared by the executive board. It provided for payment of a rate of at least 60 percent to unsubordinated, unsecured creditors with the balance to be converted through debt-to-equity swaps, granting the creditors newly issued shares in the company. Existing shareholders' shares were extinguished and no recovery was planned for subordinate creditors. (DGAP-Ad hoc March 20, 2014). Immediately following the meeting (n-TV, March 17, 2014) the former CEO, Wolfgang Schäfer, was reappointed. The Amtsgericht Bonn confirmed the insolvency plan on June 13, 2014. Appeals against confirmation were rejected by the district court in Bonn on July 11, 2014, and judicial confirmation of the insolvency plan became effective on July 15, 2014. The insolvency of IVG Immobilien AG was formally ended on August 14, 2014.

Wolfgang Schäfer stepped down from office on March 17, 2014, which had been expected, after he had driven the restructuring of the company by initiating insolvency proceedings and playing a major role in the creation of the insolvency plan. Schäfer remained in office until the end of the insolvency proceedings in September 2014. The restructuring expert Hans-Joachim Ziem was also appointed to the board. Ralf Jung took over as CEO of the company with effect from 21 September 2014, at which time Hans-Joachim Ziem left the board.
