= Marzling =

- Municipality
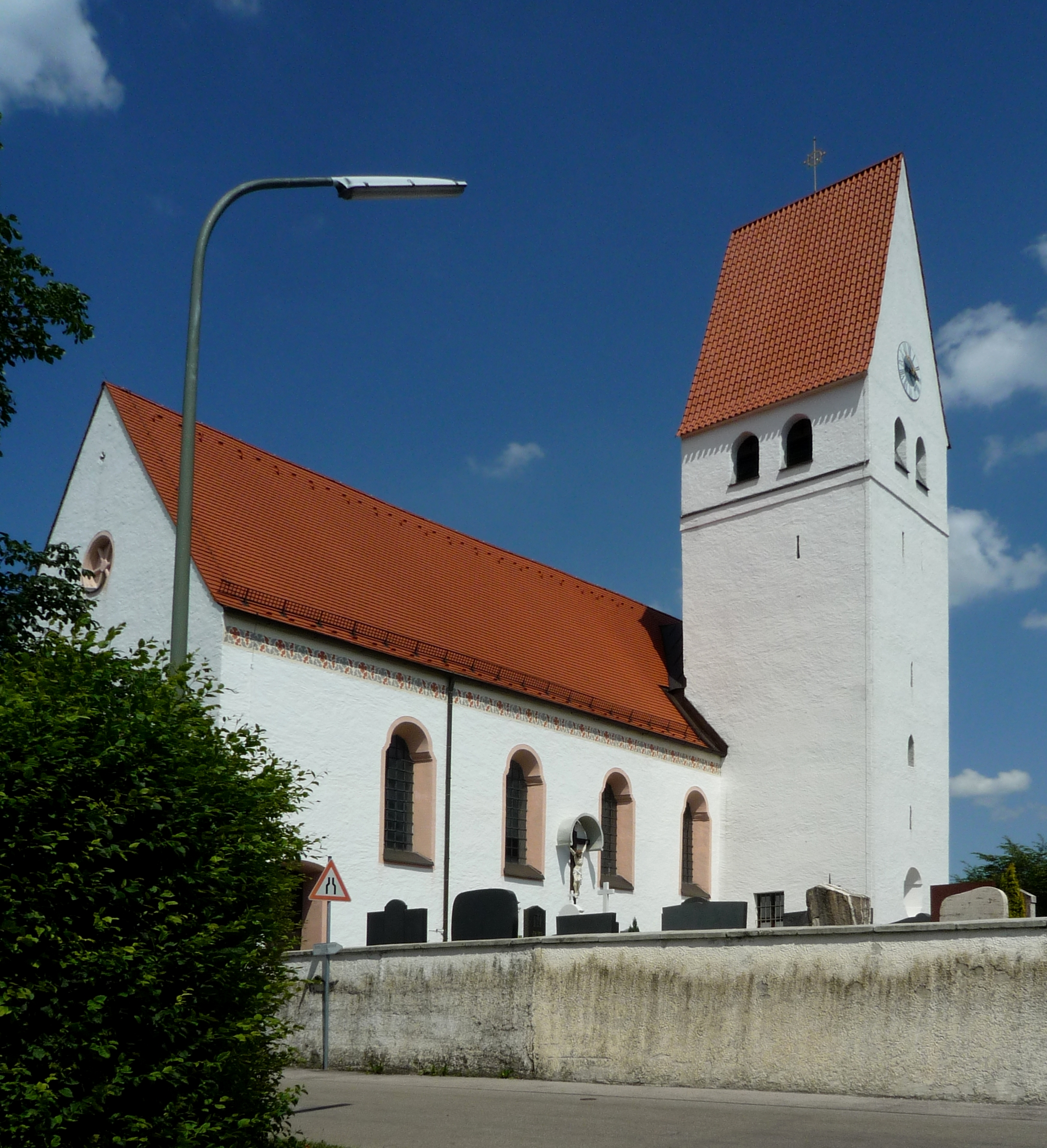
- Church of Saint Martin

- Coat of arms

- Location of Marzling within Freising district
- Interactive map of Marzling
- Location within Germany Location within Bavaria
- Coordinates: 48°24′N 11°48′E
- Country: Germany
- State: Bavaria
- Admin. region: Oberbayern
- District: Freising

Government
  - Mayor (2020–26): Martin Ernst

Area
  - Total: 20.5 km^{2} (7.9 sq mi)
- Elevation: 443 m (1,453 ft)

Population (2025-12-31)
  - Total: 3,259
  - Density: 159/km^{2} (412/sq mi)
- Time zone: UTC+01:00 (CET)
  - Summer (DST): UTC+02:00 (CEST)
- Postal codes: 85417
- Dialling codes: 08161
- Vehicle registration: FS
- Website: www.marzling.de

Marzling (German pronunciation: [ˈmaʁtslɪŋ]) is a municipality in the district of Freising in Bavaria in Germany.
