= Airport city =

Inside-the-fence area of an airport

The airport city is a model for urban development that focuses on improving the livability of the areas within and immediately surrounding a large airport in support of a variety of economic and social activities. An "airport city" is differentiated from a "city airport" by its design, which includes both the interior and outside areas. An "airport city" offers various amenities found in an urban center in addition to the transportation services of an airport.

Airport cities can be a part of a regional concept promoted as an "aerotropolis", particularly by John D. Kasarda, who began using the term in 2000. Kasarda is a faculty member at the University of North Carolina's Kenan-Flagler Business School and is the CEO of Aerotropolis Business Concepts LLC (an airport-economy consulting firm) and the Aerotropolis Institute of China.

Airport cities may be found at major airports worldwide, particularly in Europe. Some older airports are being redeveloped or expanded toward the airport city model on large tracts of unused airport land. Some new airports in Asia are also being planned as airport cities. North America, South America, and Africa all have airport cities and aerotropolis developments.

== General description and driving principles ==
The airport city model is based on the idea that an airport can target non-aeronautical services such as offices, hotels, convention centers, and entertainment to create additional and more reliable sources of income. Airports using the airport city model are now routinely targeting non-aeronautical revenue streams amounting up to 40–60% of their total revenues, dependent on the chosen airport city business model.

Since airports are typically surrounded by undeveloped land that acts as an environmental buffer for nearby residents, the land holdings can also present a real estate opportunity.

The design of any airport and its surroundings includes considering passengers, cargo, businesses, workers, and residents of the area.

In 2011, Time named the airport city concept in its feature on "10 ideas that will change the world".

Kasarda promotes the following driving principles for the development of airport cities:

- The creation of non-aeronautical revenue sources as well as serving traditional aviation functions
- The commercial sector's pursuit of affordable, accessible land
- Increased gateway passengers and cargo traffic generated by airports
- Airports serve as a catalyst and magnet for land-side business development

The most common airport city commercial activities include duty-free shops and airline lounges; restaurants, catering, and other food services; specialty retail and factory outlet centers; cultural and entertainment attractions; hotels; banks and currency exchanges; business offices and complexes; convention and exhibition centers; leisure, recreation and fitness venues; logistics and distribution; perishables and cold storage; and free trade zones and customs-free zones.

== Promotional activities and subsidies ==
A qualitative list of airport city characteristics has been developed by Kasarda and his colleagues at the University of North Carolina at Chapel Hill. Their criteria include:

- Demonstrated commitment to the aerotropolis or airport city model as seen in the establishment of aerotropolis steering committees, strategic planning, and development initiatives
- Government/regulatory support of the aerotropolis or airport city through aerotropolis legislation, tax incentives, or other mechanisms
- Media announcements by proponents with substantiated evidence that an aerotropolis or airport city initiative is moving forward
