= The Squaire =

Office and hotel building in Frankfurt, Germany

Coordinates: 50.05293°N 8.569851°E

Logo

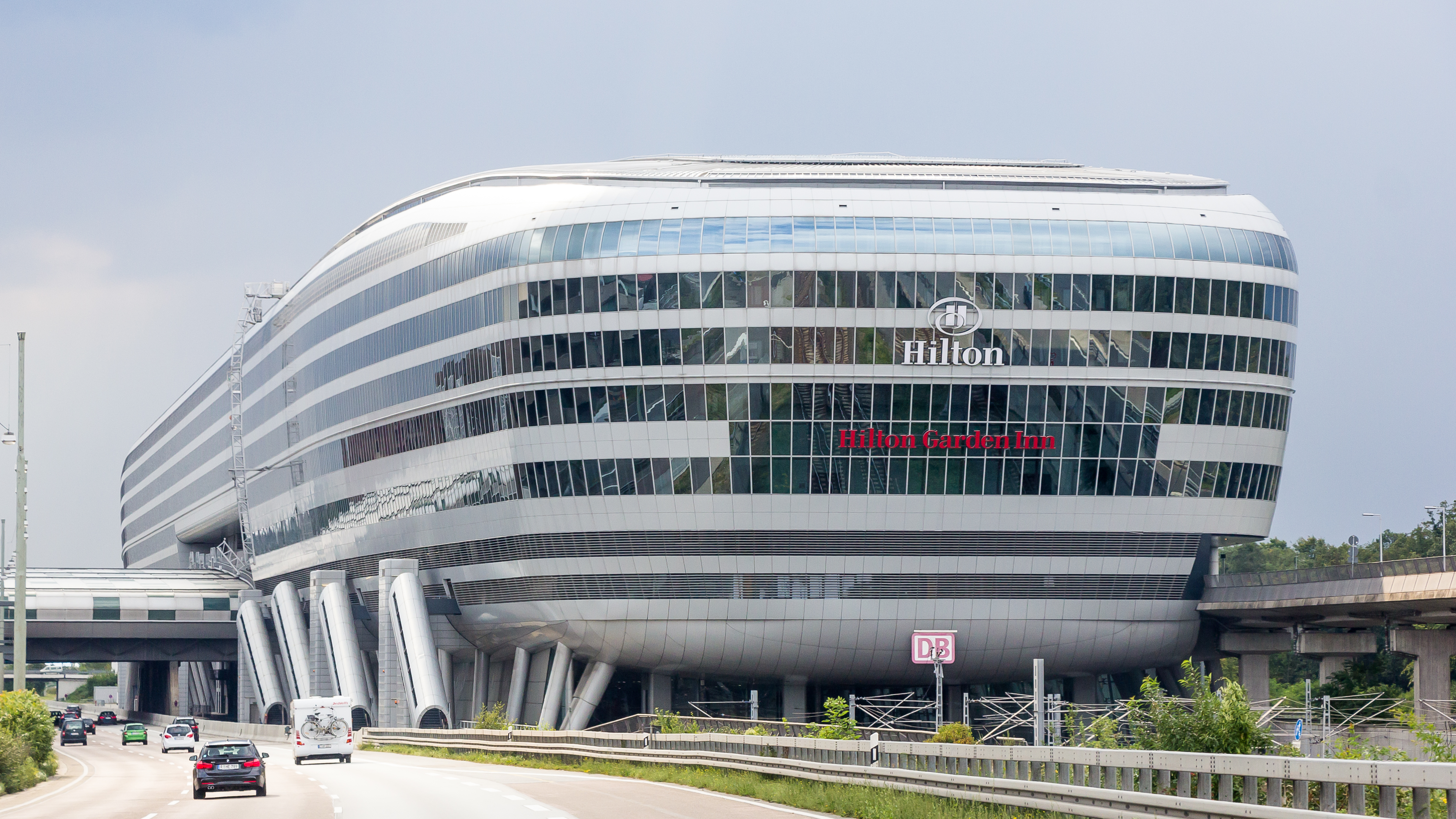
The Squaire (eastern side), next to the Bundesautobahn 3)

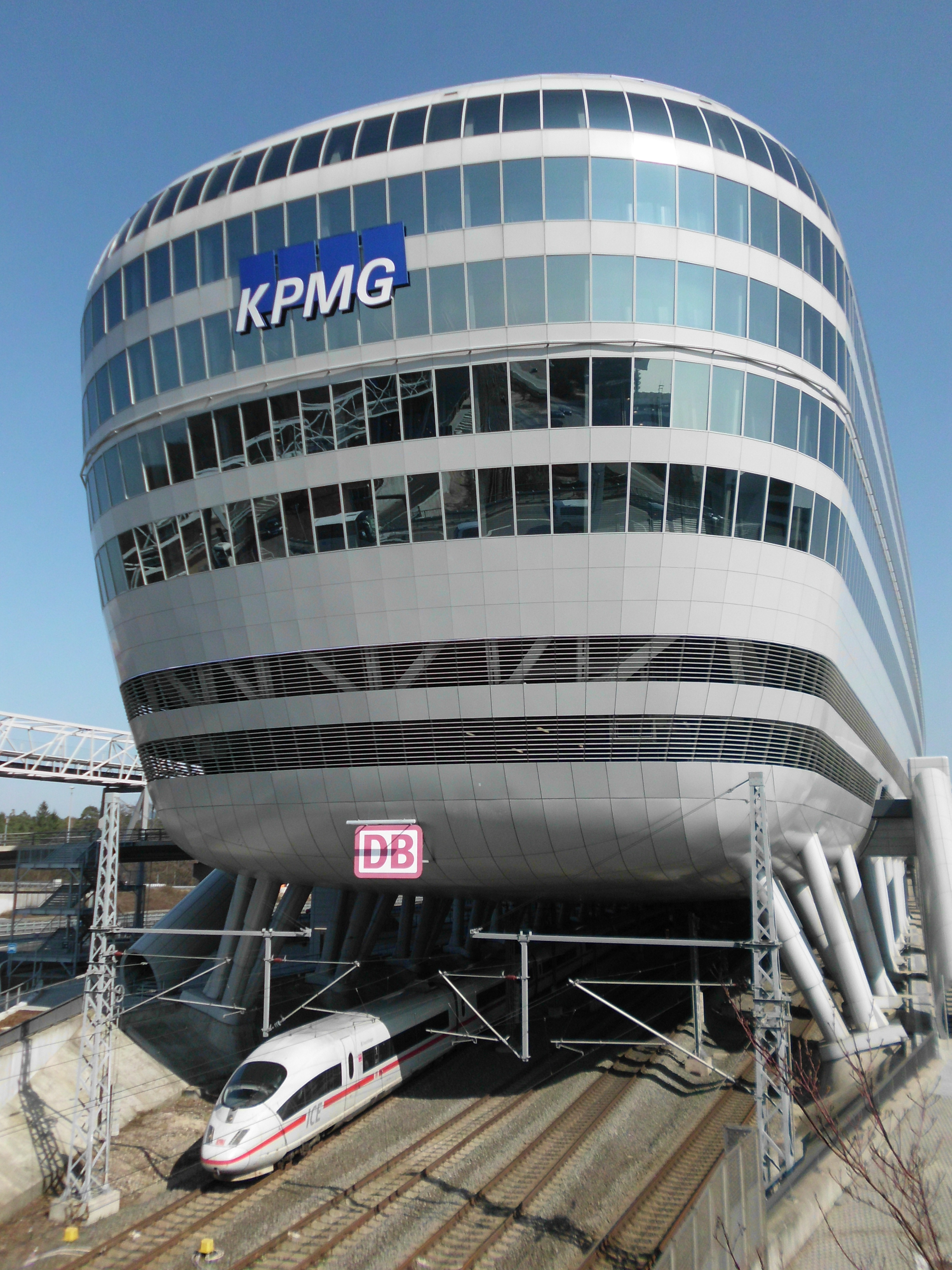
ICE 3 departing westward

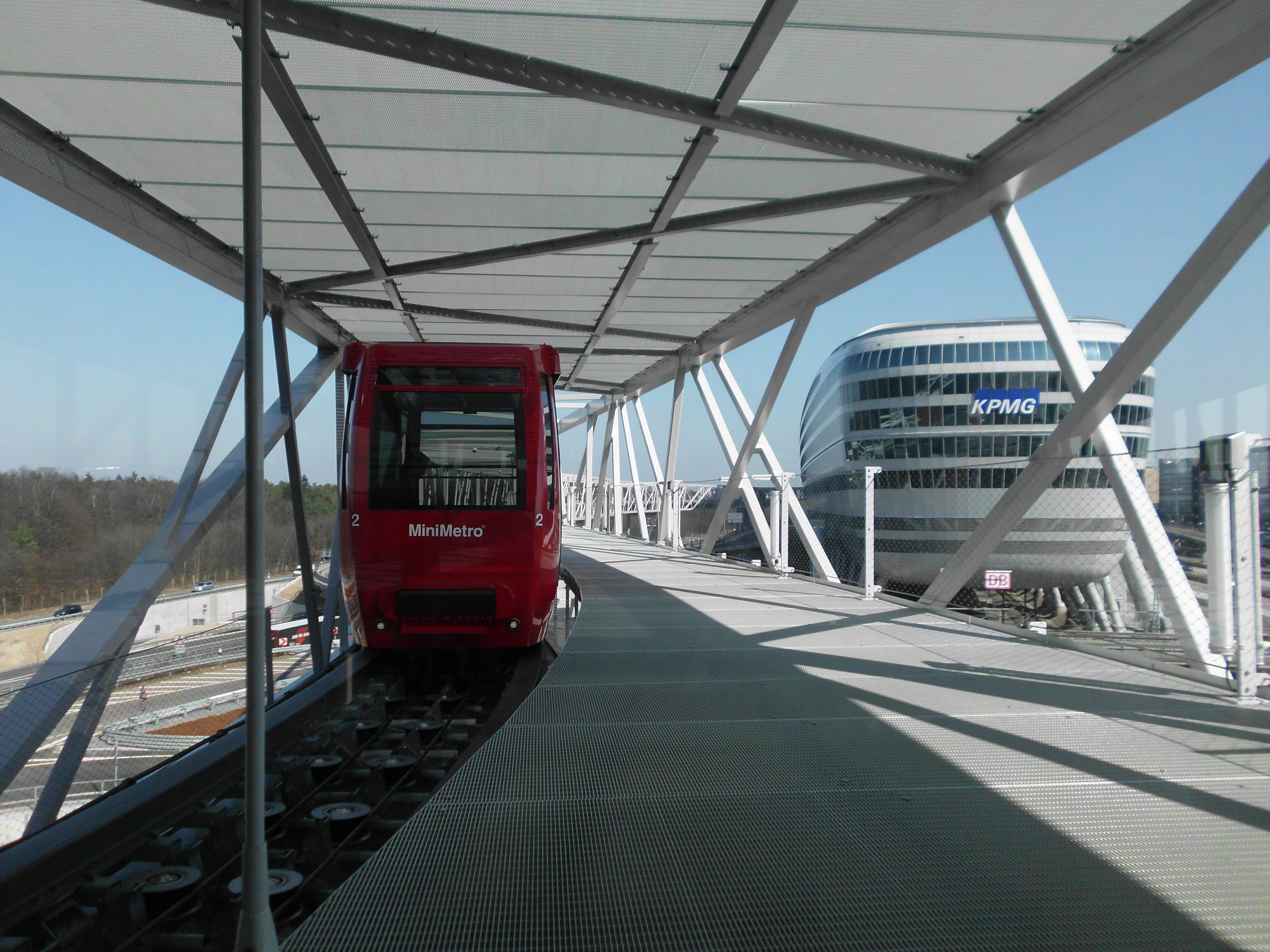
MiniMetro-people mover attending the multistorey car park

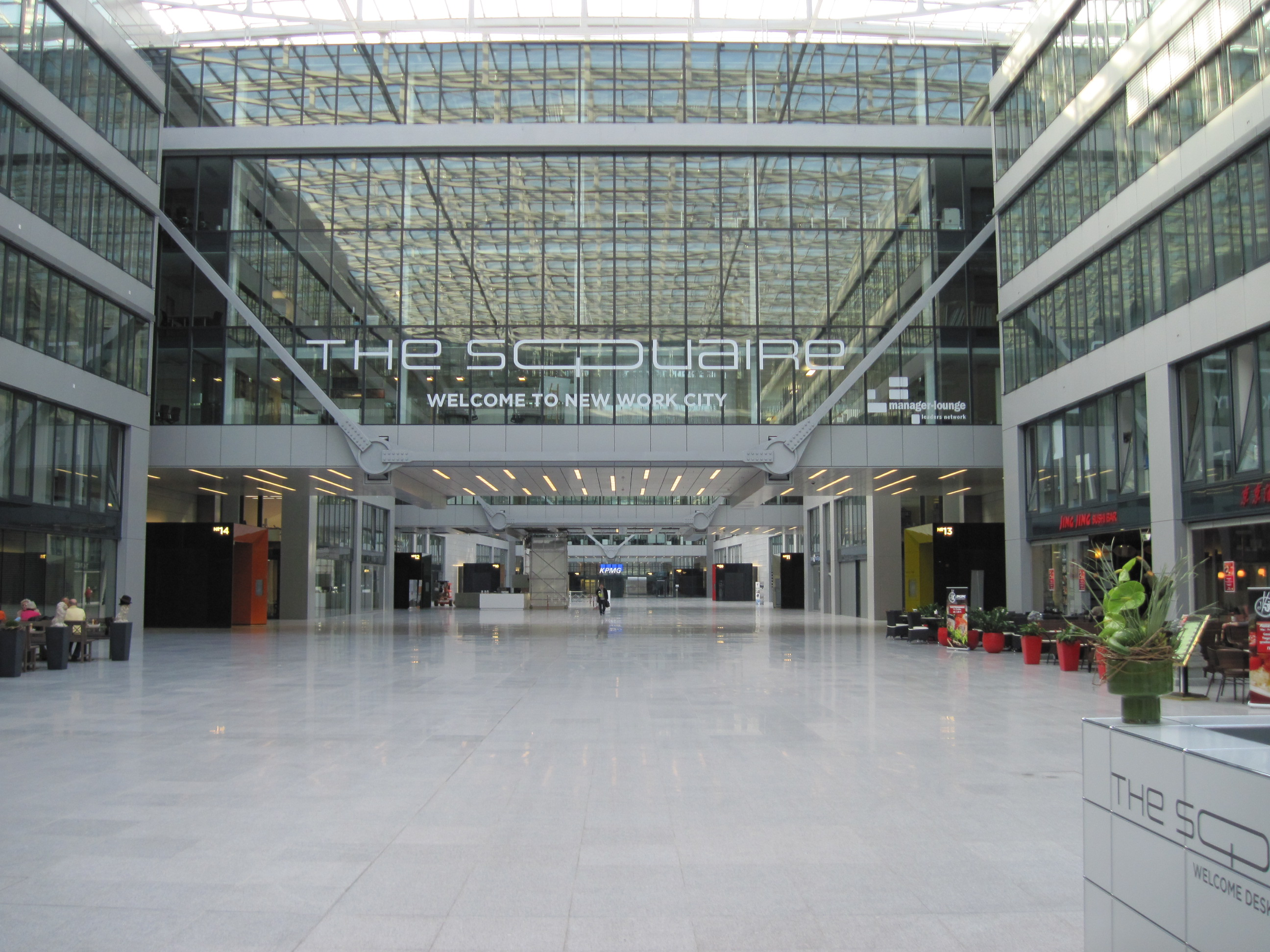
Inside The Squaire

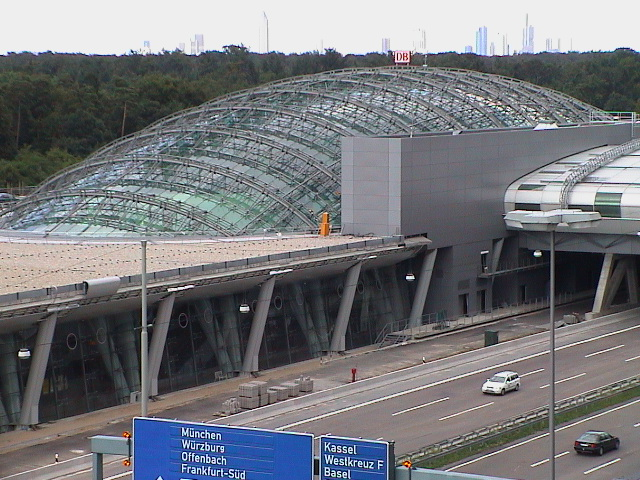
The train station before The Squaire was built on top (2000)

The Squaire is an office building in Frankfurt, Germany. It was built between 2006 and 2011 on top of an existing train station (Frankfurt Airport long-distance station) near Frankfurt Airport. The building is 660 m long, 65 m wide, and 45 m high, and it has nine floors. With a total floor area of 140,000 m^{2} (1,506,900 sq ft) it is the largest office building in Germany. The Squaire is directly connected to Terminal 1 of Frankfurt Airport through a pedestrian connecting corridor.

== Name ==
The term Squaire is a portmanteau of the words square and air. The name was announced in June 2010. The project's original name was Airrail Center Frankfurt. The term Airrail is a compound of the words air and rail.

== Location and connections ==
The Squaire is located between two motorways, the Bundesautobahn 3 and the Bundesstraße 43, close to one of the most heavily used Autobahn interchanges in Europe, the Frankfurter Kreuz. The building provides direct access to the train station below with 210 daily long-distance train connections, of which 185 are ICE trains. A connecting bridge provides access to the airport terminals as well as to the Frankfurt Airport regional station.

The Squaire is connected to a multistorey car park to the west by a MiniMetro people mover called Squaire Metro operating high above the highway driveways.

== History ==
When Deutsche Bahn announced plans to build a fast rail link between Cologne and Frankfurt (Cologne–Frankfurt high-speed rail line), it planned for a second train station at Frankfurt Airport, because it was clear that the existing train station would not be able to handle the predicted traffic. Construction work for a new train station close to the airport grounds started in 1995 and was finished in 1999. With a glass dome on top, it was designed to allow the later construction of an office building.

In November 2006, preparatory construction work on the office building started based on a design by the Frankfurt based architecture firm JSK. The main investor of the project is the IVG Immobilien AG in Bonn.

In 2006, after plans were delayed several years due to lack of potential tenants, the construction of the building, then called Airrail Center Frankfurt, began with an announced opening day in 2010. The foundation stone was laid on 1 March 2007. Planned construction costs were 660 million Euro. Trouble with the construction company and the use of bad construction steel imported from China, which had to be replaced, pushed the costs up to 1 billion Euro.

In June 2010, the name was changed to The Squaire.

From April to December 2011, the move-in of the main tenants took place in sections.

== Tenants ==
The accounting firm KPMG, two Hilton hotels, and Lufthansa occupy space in The Squaire. KPMG has rented 40,000 square metres of office space with 2,150 staff members. In the eastern part are two Hilton hotels: Hilton Garden Inn Frankfurt Airport with 334 rooms and the Hilton Frankfurt Airport with 249 rooms in a total area of 34,500 m^{2}. Lufthansa has leased 18,500 m^{2}, and 1,000 of its employees moved in by the Spring of 2012. A 3,600-square-metre (39,000 sq ft) area is provided for a medical center. 5,900 square metres (64,000 sq ft) is provided for restaurants and shops.
