= John D. Kasarda =

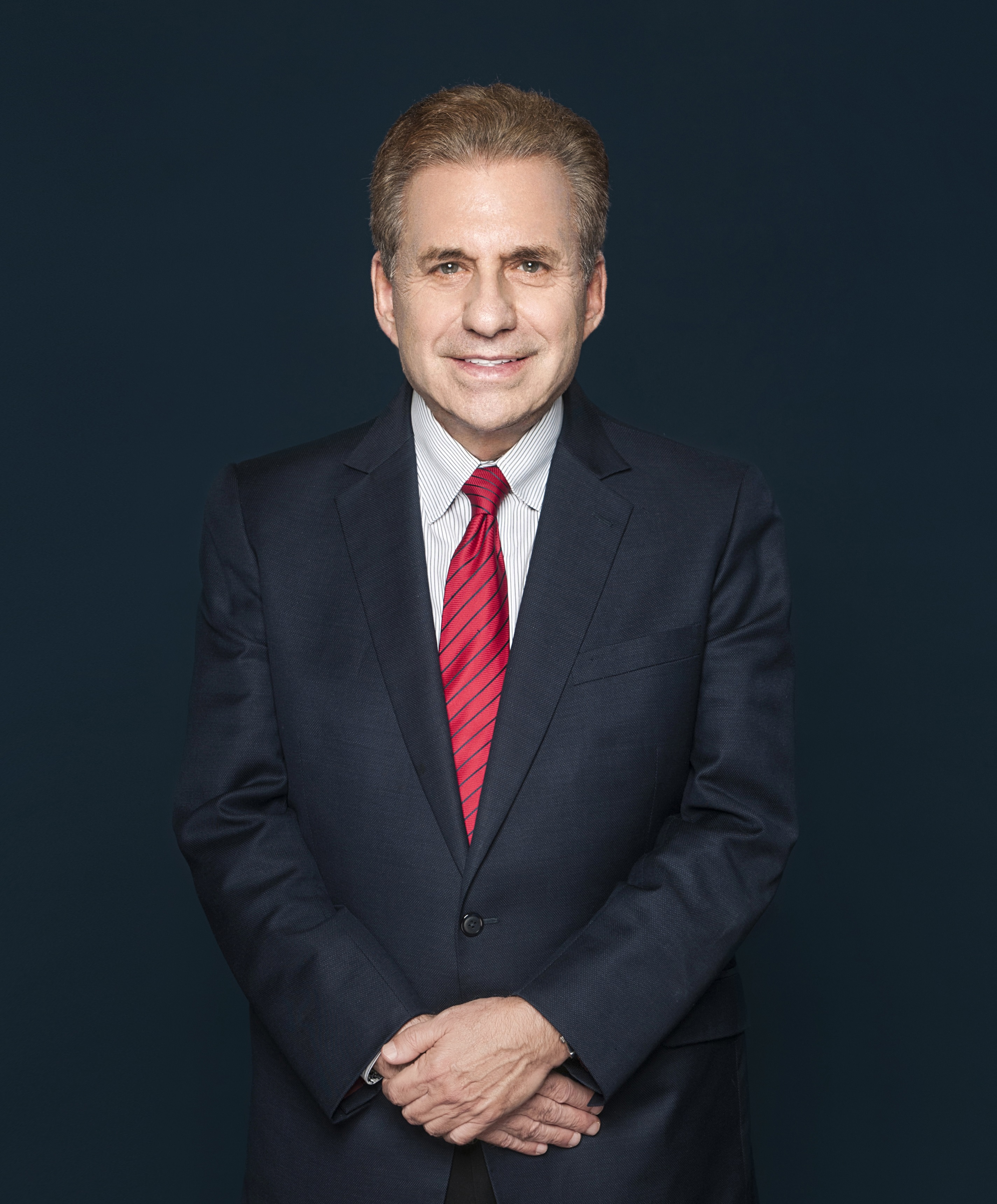
John D. Kasarda

John D. Kasarda is an American academic and airport business consultant focused on aviation-driven economic development. He is a faculty member at the University of North Carolina's Kenan-Flagler Business School, the CEO of Aerotropolis Business Concepts LLC (an airport-economy consulting firm) and the President of the Aerotropolis Institute in China. He was the founding editor-in-chief of Logistics, an open-access journal published by MDPI. Kasarda is often referred to as "father of the aerotropolis", in which aerotropolis is a term used by Kasarda to describe a metropolitan subregion whose infrastructure, land use, and economy are centered on an airport – a phenomenon also known as an airport city.

== Career ==
Kasarda has a background in economics, business, and urban sociology, and has conducted research on urban form, organizational structure, airport development, and regional economic growth. He has written 10 books and over 150 published articles, many of which synthesize two or more of these topics.

From 1980 to 1990, he chaired UNC's Department of Sociology, where he held the position of Kenan Distinguished Professor. In 1990, Kasarda moved to UNC's Kenan-Flagler Business School as Kenan Distinguished Professor of Strategy and Entrepreneurship, and Director of the Frank Hawkins Kenan Institute of Private Enterprise. Over the following 22 years, he worked at the Institute for the study of entrepreneurship, regional economic development, and global competitiveness, and helped establish the Kenan Foundation Asia in Bangkok, where he continues to serve on its board and executive committee.

Kasarda stepped down from UNC's Kenan Institute directorship in 2012, but maintained his Kenan-Flagler faculty position. Much of his research and applied work since 2000 has addressed how aviation and airports impact the competitiveness and growth of firms, cities, and regions. Kasarda developed what he has termed the "aerotropolis" model for the role of aviation and airports. His theories and applied work were elaborated upon in a 2012 book Aerotropolis: The Way We'll Live Next, co-authored with Greg Lindsay. Kasarda has consulted on various aerotropolis developments around the world, though his most extensive efforts have been in China.

Kasarda's model has its critics including an organization called the Global Anti-Aerotropolis Movement. Nevertheless, its application has been expanding internationally, such as in Amsterdam, Beijing, Dubai, and Johannesburg, Memphis, Paris, Sydney, and Zhengzhou.

Kasarda earned a Bachelor of Science in Applied Economics from Cornell University in 1967, a Master of Business Administration in Organizational Theory from Cornell in 1968, and a Ph.D. in Sociology from the University of North Carolina at Chapel Hill in 1971.

== Awards and recognitions ==
- In 2006, The New York Times selected Kasarda's aerotropolis concept as one of its "Ideas of the Year".
- In 2010, Brazil awarded the State of Minas Gerais Grande Medalha of Inconfidência to Kasarda for his contributions to the Belo Horizonte Aerotropolis.
- In 2011, Time magazine named the airport-centered concept as one of the "10 Ideas that Will Change the World".
- In 2013, Future Cities magazine named Kasarda one of the Top 100 City Innovators Worldwide.
- In 2015, Kasarda received China's 1000 Foreign Talents national award for his work as Chief Adviser to the Zhengzhou Airport Economic Zone, an "aerotropolis" covering 415 km^{2}.
- In 2016, he was awarded the Yellow River prize for his airport economic development work in Henan Province.
- In 2019, he was recognized by the Hebei Provincial Government for his contributions to the planning and development of the Beijing Daxing International Airport Economy Zone.
