= Show Me the Money 12 =

Twelfth season of South Korean rap competition TV show

- Season 12
- Hosted by: Kim Jin-pyo; DJ Holyship
- Judges: Team Zico & Crush; Zico; Crush; Team Gray & Loco; Gray; Loco; Team J-Tong & Hukky Shibaseki; J-Tong; Hukky Shibaseki; Team Lil Moshpit & Jay Park; Lil Moshpit; Jay Park
- Winner: Haon
- Runners-up: Nowimyoung (1st runner-up); Tray B (2nd runner-up); Milli (3rd runner-up); Mason Home (4th runner-up)

Release
- Original network: Mnet
- Original release: January 15, 2026 – present

Season chronology
- ← Previous; Show Me the Money 11

The twelfth season of the series Show Me the Money premiered on January 15, 2026. It aired every Thursday at 23:00 (KST) on Mnet. The season featured four new producer teams in Zico & Crush, Gray & Loco, J-Tong & Hukky Shibaseki, and Jay Park & Lil Moshpit.

In addition, a spin-off titled Show Me the Money 12: Yaksha's World would concurrently air on Saturdays beginning January 17 via TVING, where several contestants who were eliminated from the first, second, and third rounds of the main show compete with one another, and only three contestants would be revived to continue on the main show. Homies, Loopy, Kaogaii, Reddy, Apro, Yungin, Hangzoo (Rhythm Power), Ian Kash and Rad Museum would serve as the spin-off's masters. The spin-off concluded on February 14, with Mason Home, YLN Foreign, and Nowimyoung being revived into the main show beginning the fourth round.

Haon is announced as the winner of the season, with Zico & Crush being the winning team.

== Judges ==
Team Zico & Crush

- Zico: Rapper, Singer-songwriter, producer and member of the group Block B, and member of the hip-hop crew Fanxychild. Previously participated as producer in Season 4 for Team ZiPal, and in Season 6 for Team Fanxychild.
- Crush: Singer-songwriter, rapper and record producer currently signed under P Nation.

Team Gray & Loco

- Gray: Rapper and producer signed under Duover. Previously participated in season 5, where he was one of the winning producers of Team AOMG, and in Season 10 for Team Gray x Mino.
- Loco: Rapper signed to his own label Locomotive. He won Season 1 as a contestant, and participated as a producer in Season 4 for Team AOMG.

Team J-Tong & Hukky Shibaseki

- J-Tong: Rapper signed under Stoneship. He was one of the winners of Rap:Public.
- Hukky Shibaseki: Music producer signed under Jjangyou Shibaseki, which he launched with rapper Jjangyou.

Team Jay Park & Lil Moshpit

- Jay Park: Rapper, singer, and current CEO of More Vision. Also a former CEO of AOMG and H1ghr Music. Previously participated as producer in Season 4 for Team AOMG, in Season 6 for Team AOM&1llionaire, and in Season 11 for Team Jay Park x Slom.
- Lil Moshpit: A member of GroovyRoom, real name Lee Hwi-min. In 2022, he released solo album AAA which won Hip Hop Album of the Year at the Korean Hip-hop Awards. Previously participated as producer in Season 9 for Team GroovyRoom x Justhis, and in Season 11 for Team Lil Boi x GroovyRoom.

== Teams ==
The Producer Teams were formed during the Team Matching round, in which five members per team were selected.

Team Zico & Crush (also known as Zic)

- Haon – Signed under KC. He was the winner of High School Rapper 2. Previously participated in Rap:Public.
- Raf Sandou – Signed under POV. He is a member of the rap collective Okashii. Previously participated in Rap:Public.
- Jung Jun-hyuk – Korean-Canadian rapper known by the stage name SAinT. Former YG Entertainment trainee, and participated in YG Treasure Box where the group Treasure was formed but didn't make the final group, and KBS audition show The Ddanddara.
- Marv – Signed under Eclipse Empire. Previously participated in Rap:Public.
- Nosun – Korean-American rapper signed under Ambition Musik. He was one of the winners of Rap:Public.

Team Gray & Loco (also known as Coray)

- Milli – Rapper from Thailand. She is the only non-Korean contestant to be in a Producer Team in the history of Show Me The Money.
- Mason Home – Signed under POV. He is a member of the rap collective Okashii. He was originally eliminated in the 4-on-4 Team Mission round, then took part in Yaksha's World, and was revived into the main show after finishing in the Top 3 of the spin-off.
- Osun – Previously participated in High School Rapper 4, and was one of the winners of Rap:Public.
- Foggyatthebottom – Korean-American rapper signed under TSP the Label. He was one of the winners of Rap:Public.
- Oxynova – Korean-Canadian rapper signed under Yng & Rich Records. He is a member of Naughty 4 Life crew. Previously participated in Drop The Bit.

Team J-Tong & Hukky Shibaseki (also known as Tongki)

- Nowimyoung – Signed under KC. He was originally eliminated in the 1-on-1 Level Mission round, then took part in Yaksha's World, and was revived into the main show after finishing in the Top 3 of the spin-off.
- Fleeky Bang – Signed under Dirty Play Records. Previously participated in season 11 as a member of Team Lil Boi & GroovyRoom, and Rap:Public.
- Royal 44 – Signed under Yng & Rich Records.
- Double Down – Korean-American rapper. Previously participated in Rap:Public.
- Young Shooter – He was originally eliminated in the 1-on-1 Level Mission round, but Team Gray & Loco used their Producer Pass in the round to revive him.

Team Jay Park & Lil Moshpit (also known as Mobum)

- Tray B – Signed under Dirty Play Records. Previously participated in Rap:Public.
- Zene the Zilla – Signed under Ambition Musik. Previously participated in seasons 2 to 8 (participated in season 2 under his real name Lee Sang-yong), and Rap:Public.
- Flowsik – Korean-American rapper signed to his own label South Paw Record. Formerly a member of Aziatix. Previously participated in season 5 as a member of Team Illionaire.
- Jeffrey White – Signed under POV. He is a member of the rap collective Okashii. Previously participated in Rap:Public. He was originally eliminated in the 1-on-1 Level Mission round, but Team Zico & Crush used their Producer Pass in the round to revive him.
- Dkay – Korean-Australian rapper. He was originally eliminated in the 1-on-1 Level Mission round, but Team Jay Park & Lil Moshpit used their Producer Pass in the round to revive him.

== Rounds ==
=== Round 1: A Cappella Rap Mission ===
Prospective rappers uploaded their audition clips to social media and the production crew selected individuals to attend the first mission. Each contestant will perform a short a cappella rap in front of the producer. The producer will provide an evaluation of the contestant and determine if they will advance to the next round. Similar to previous seasons, the contestant will be given a chain to indicate that they've passed the round. A total of 152 contestants were selected to advance to the next round.

Notable Contestants from Round 1

| Producer Judge | Passed Selection Round | Failed Selection Round |
|---|---|---|
| Zico | | |
| Crush | | |
| Gray | | |
| Loco | | |
| J-Tong | | |
| Hukky Shibaseki | | |
| Jay Park | | |
| Lil Moshpit | | |

=== Round 2: 60-Second Rap Mission ===
The remaining contestants will participate in a 60-second beat rap, performing their rap in front of all 8 judges. If a producer team does not like or prefer the performance, they will press a button to 'Fail' the rapper. At least one producer team has to 'Pass' the contestant in order for them to progress to the next round. If a contestant is failed by all 4 producer teams, the pit flames will be lit and the stage will lower the rapper down to their elimination, where they will also surrender their SMTM necklace. A total of 73 rappers passed and advanced to the next round.

=== Round 3: Hell Song Camp - 1:1 Rank Mission ===
The contestants have been split into categories of High and Low level rappers. A High level rapper will face off against a Low level rapper. To select the matchups, the High level rappers each selected a Low level rapper to face off against. Starting with the rapper who received the most selections, they would choose the rapper they would face. If chosen by only one High level rapper, the matchup is automatically set. This process will continue until 3 unchosen rappers are left - these three will perform a 1:1:1 match. The producers will choose which rapper had the better performance and that contestant will advance, while the loser will be eliminated. Each producer team also has one Producer Pass to save a contestant who would otherwise be eliminated. Along with the 36 rappers that won their matchups, 4 were saved with the Producer Pass, leaving a total of 40 rappers to advance to the next round.

=== Round 4: Hell Song Camp - 4:4 Team Mission ===
The producers selected 10 rappers to serve as leaders for this mission, and each leader will choose 3 rappers to be members of their team. Lots were drawn to decide on the picking order for the leaders. Of the 5 available beats, the two teams that choose the same beat will battle each other. All members of each winning team would survive, and two members of each losing team would be selected for elimination. A total of 30 rappers passed and advanced to the next round.

=== Round 5: Hell Song Camp - Duet Mission ===
For this mission, two rappers will team up to put on a duet performance in under 100 seconds. If 3 or more producer teams hit the button to give a Pass within those 100 seconds, both contestants will survive and advance. However, for teams that do not get the minimum of 3 passes, both contestants will be eliminated. To select duet teams, an internal vote was held among the contestants to select the top-ranked rappers, and the rappers selected their duet partners starting with the highest ranked contestants. Any rappers that want to duet with those top-ranked rappers can stand on stage and appeal, and the top-ranked rapper will select the contestant they wish to pair with. Jay Park was unavailable for the filming of this round, so Lil Moshpit made PASS decisions solo. A total of 28 contestants passed and advanced to the next round, with only KC and Yang Kyle failing to get 3 passes. Additionally, the winners of Show Me The Money 12: Yaksha's World, Nowimyoung, Mason Home, and YLN Foreign were revived back to the main show and would return beginning Round 6, bringing the final total to 31 contestants.

=== Team Song Mission ===
At the end of each performance, the producers of each team would eliminate one contestant. The eliminated contestants after the performances will be part of the official release version of the songs.

| Team | Contestants | Song | Eliminated |
|---|---|---|---|
| Zic | Haon, Nosun, Raf Sandou, Jung Jun-hyuk, Marv | "Tick Tock" | Nosun |
| Coray | Mason Home, Oxynova, Milli, Foggyatthebottom, Osun | "Ssak" (싹) | Oxynova |
| Tongki | Nowimyoung, Royal 44, Fleeky Bang, Young Shooter, Double Down | "Money Checks" | Young Shooter |
| Mobum | DKay, Zene the Zilla, Tray B, Flowsik, Jeffrey White | 'No Manners" | Dkay |

=== First live performances ===
The winning teams of the previous round would go against each other and the losing teams of the previous round would go against each other. The losing teams would feature one duet performance with featuring, and one solo collaboration performance with a producer, plus an additional solo performance with featuring for the winning teams. For the duet performance matchups, the team with the lesser audience votes would eliminate one contestant of the two. For solo matchups, the contestant with the lesser audience votes would be eliminated.

| Team | Contestants | Song | vs. | Team | Contestants | Song | Eliminated |
|---|---|---|---|---|---|---|---|
| Zic | Marv | "MDLZ" (물들이자) (feat. Penomeco) | vs. | Mobum | Zene the Zilla | "Mr. Rocklee" (feat. Justhis) | Marv |
| Zic | Raf Sandou, Jung Jun-hyuk | "Dirt!" (feat. Zico) | vs. | Mobum | Jeffrey White, Tray B | "Mama" (feat. Uneducated Kid) | Jeffrey White |
| Zic | Haon | "Soom" (숨) (feat. Crush) | vs. | Mobum | Flowsik | "Bounce Back" (feat. Jay Park) | Flowsik |
| Coray | Osun, Mason Home | "Sky Pass" (feat. Bobby (iKon)) | vs. | Tongki | Nowimyoung, Royal 44 | "Kiss Kiss Kiss" (feat. Sunwoo (The Boyz)) | Royal 44 |
| Coray | Milli | "AEIOU" (아에이오우) (feat. Loco) | vs. | Tongki | Fleeky Bang | "Emergency" (비상사태) (feat. J-Tong) | Fleeky Bang |
