= Milli (rapper) =

Thai rapper and singer (born 2002)

MILLI มิลลิ
- Born: Danupha Khanatheerakul; 13 November 2002 (age 23); Bangkok, Thailand
- Genres: Hip hop; T-pop
- Occupations: Rapper; singer
- Instrument: Vocals
- Years active: 2019–present
- Labels: YUPP!; 88rising

Danupha Khanatheerakul (Thai: ดนุภา คณาธีรกุล; RTGS: Danupha Khanathirakun) (born 13 November 2002) better known by her stage name, Milli (stylized in all caps), is a Thai rapper and singer. She rose to prominence nationally with her debut singles "Phak Kon" (พักก่อน) and "Sud Pang" (สุดปัง). In April 2022, she performed at the Coachella Valley Music and Arts Festival, becoming the first Thai solo artist to perform there. In January 2026, she competed in the South Korean hip-hop competition Show Me The Money.

Milli appeared on BBC's 100 Women list as one of the world's inspiring and influential women of the year 2022.

== Early life ==
Milli was born on 13 November 2002 in Bangkok, Thailand. She graduated from Satrinonthaburi School. She has had an interest in hip-hop since when she was in Matthayom 2 (equivalent to Grade 8) and has cited Nicki Minaj as her inspiration.

== Career ==
Milli began her career on stage by competing on the Thai TV show The Rapper 2. She was praised by the contest's judges for her exotic acting and singing style. She is registered as an artist under YUPP! Entertainment, a Thai rapping-centred label.

=== Debut singles ===
Milli recorded her first single "Phak Khon" (พักก่อน) in February 2020, a sarcastic hip-hop fused song about her friends in school and a message of anti-bullying. This song uses Lu, Isan and English. It launched her into popularity, with the music video reaching 90,226,674 views on YouTube as of April 2022.

In June 2020, she recorded a second single "Sud Pang" (สุดปัง), that is about her life, dreams and beauty. This song uses Thai (Northern and Southern), Isan, Japanese, phasa lu, and English. This song has 43,308,512 views on YouTube as of April 2022.

"Mirror Mirror" was released in October 2021 and is a collaborative song by Milli, F.HERO, and Changbin, a prominent member of the South Korean boy group, Stray Kids. The track gained significant popularity in Thailand, garnering over 100 million views on YouTube.

=== Coachella Festival 2022 ===
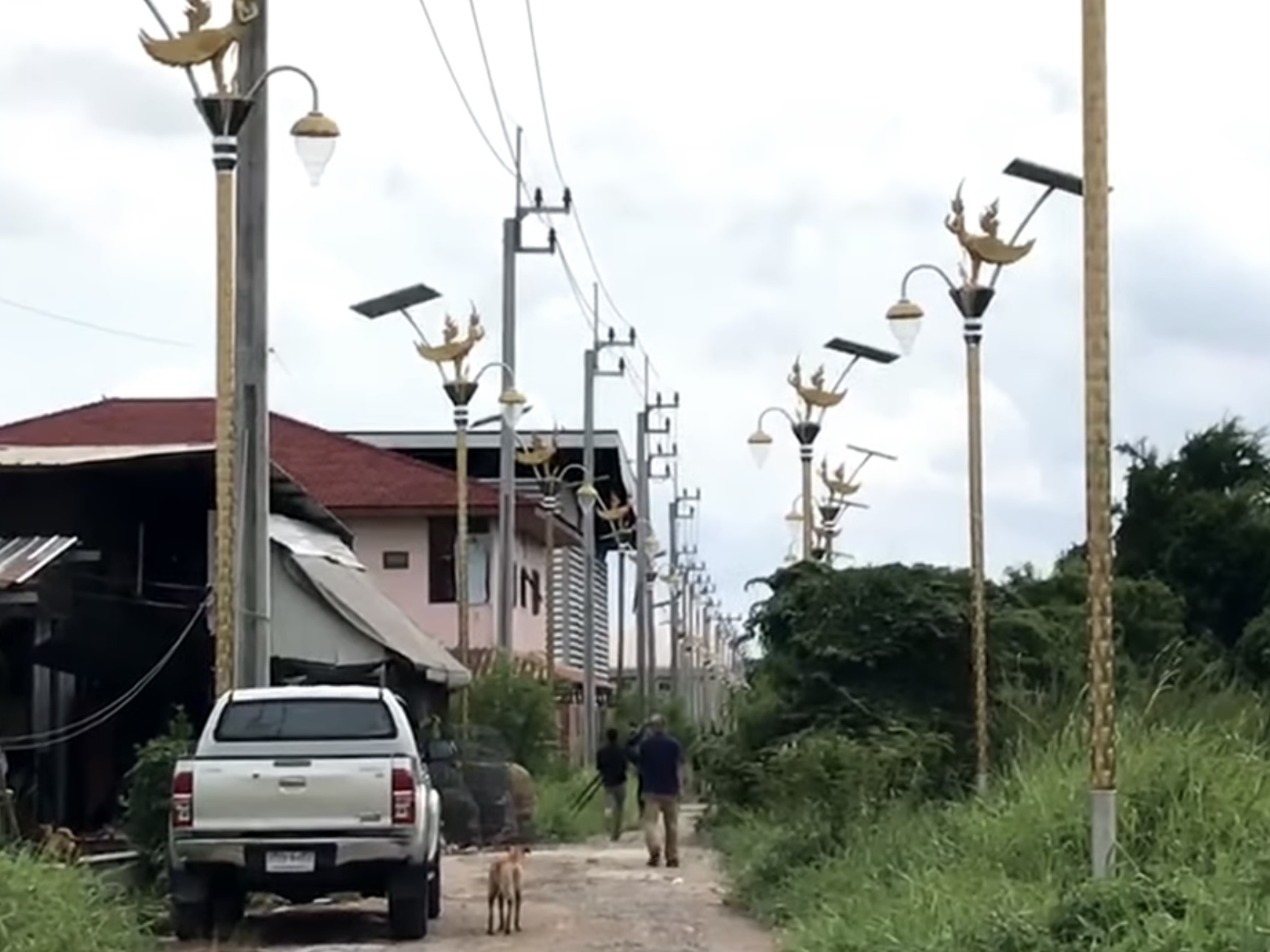
Some of the Racha Thewa's Kinnari-topped light poles that were mentioned in her performance.

Milli performed with artists from 88rising at the Coachella Valley Music and Arts Festival on 17 April 2022, making her the first Thai solo artist to perform there. Her performance included a rapping that mentioned "trains from Rama V's reign – in use for 120 years"; referring to the outdated trains still used regularly in modern Thai Railway, and "hundred-thousand-baht Kinnari light poles"; referring to the notorious corruption case of Racha Thewa subdistrict government spending state funds on the Kinnari-topped light poles, costing THB 100,000 each and THB 68.2 millions in total. She finished her show eating a dish of Thai dessert mango sticky rice on the stage, leading to a surge in consumption of the dish in Thailand, with orders for mango sticky rice doubling in some stores. A mango sticky rice store in Bangkok reported that an additional 30 kilograms (66 lb) of sticky rice had to be prepared following the unprecedented surge for the dish.

Around the same time, the Thai film Fast & Feel Love in which she made a cameo has been released in cinemas. She coincidentally mentioned her dream of becoming an internationally recognised artist as part of her dialogue in the film. This prompts the film's director Nawapol Thamrongrattanarit to post on Facebook congratulating her, saying "the film and reality have now crossed and co-exist at the same time".

=== Muay Thai ===
On April 18, 2025, it was announced that Milli prepared to competed in a Muay Thai for the first time. She made her debut against Jiduo Jishi at an amateur bout in a main event of Fairtex Fight event in Lumpinee Stadium on May 17, 2025, her ring name as Umnuayjit Sitlaeksue (อำนวยจิต สิทธิ์แลกซื้อ). She lost the fight via unanimous decision, which all three judges scored bout 29–28.

=== Show Me The Money ===
In 2026, Milli became one of the contestants of the 12th season of the South Korean hip-hop reality show Show Me The Money. She was placed under Team Gray & Loco during the Team Matching Round. Milli made history as the first Thai rapper to reach the finals, and eventually place as the 3rd runner-up and winning the Global Vote category.

== Personal life ==
On 21 July 2021, the military government of Prayut Chan-o-cha charged her for criticizing its poor response to the COVID-19 pandemic. She was accused of posting information which "threatens the national security", a crime punishable by up to five years in prison. Thai netizens, including multiple artists and music entities, voiced out their support of her using the hashtag "#Saveมิลลิ" (#SaveMilli). The government additionally vowed to prosecute at least 20 more Thai influencers for criticizing the government, accusing them of spreading "fake news". She was fined 2,000 baht according to the Criminal Code Section 393.

== Discography ==
=== Studio album ===
| Title | Album details |
|---|---|
| Babb Bum Bum | Released: November 9, 2022; Label: YUPP! Entertainment; Formats: Digital download, streaming |
| Heavyweight | Released: July 11, 2025; Label: YUPP! Entertainment, 88rising; Formats: Digital download, streaming |

=== Singles ===
| Title | Year | Album |
|---|---|---|
| "Phak Kon" (พักก่อน) | 2020 | Non-album singles |
| "Sud Pang" (สุดปัง) | 2020 | Non-album singles |
| "Nu Tham Eng" (หนูทำเอง) | 2021 | Non-album singles |
| "To the Max" | 2021 | Non-album singles |
| "Not Yet!" | 2021 | Babb Bum Bum |
| "The Weekend" (Milli remix) (with Bibi) | 2022 | Non-album single |
| "17 Min" (17 นาที) | 2022 | Babb Bum Bum |
| "Mango Sticky Rice" | 2022 | Non-album single |
| "Sad Aerobic" | 2022 | Babb Bum Bum |
| "Welcome" | 2022 | Babb Bum Bum |
| "Mind Games" (featuring Jackson Wang) | 2022 | Non-album single |
| "HEY HEY" (featuring Aphaphorn Nakhonsawan) | 2025 | Heavyweight |
| "Wake Up Call" (ตื่น [From ซองแดงแต่งผี]) | 2025 | The Red Envelope (Original Soundtrack Album) |
| "MENACE" | 2025 | Heavyweight |
| "AEIOU" (featuring Loco) | 2026 | Show Me The Money 12 Soundtrack |

=== OSTs ===
| Year | Song name | Featured artists | For |
|---|---|---|---|
| 2020 | "คนจะรวย" (Khon Ja Ruai) | MAIYARAP | The Graduates บัณฑิตเจ็บใหม่ |
| 2020 | "เอาให้ชัด" (Ao Hai Chat) | Puimek | Friend Zone 2 Dangerous Area |
| 2024 | "ปราถนาเพียงจะเชื่อ" | | Bangkok Blossom บางกอกคณิกา |

=== As a leading or featured artist ===
| Year | Song name | Assisting artists | Notes |
|---|---|---|---|
| 2020 | "Chang Mang" | F.HERO, ALL STARS | |
| 2020 | "ไม่รู้จัก" (MAI RU JAK) | RAMASUON, ICESPAZZ | |
| 2020 | "ดูออก" (LOOKOUT) | มีน, PAESAXMILD, ว่าน วันวาน | |
| 2020 | "พูดปด" (LIE) | LIL ICE | |
| 2020 | "ไหนเล่า" (Nai Lao?) | AUTTA, BLACKSHEEP | |
| 2020 | "โนสน โนแคร์" (No Son No Khae) | นิวจิ๋ว, หวาย | |
| 2020 | "แฟนใหม่หน้าคุ้น" (Faen Mai Na Khun) | MAIYARAP | |
| 2020 | "ติ๊ดติ้ว" (TIID TIIW) | MAIYARAP, LAZYLOXY, AUTTA, BEN BIZZY, NAMEMT, BLACKSHEEP | |
| 2020 | "7YUPP" | MAIYARAP, LAZYLOXY, AUTTA, BEN BIZZY, NAMEMT, BLACKSHEEP | |
| 2020 | "ตาแตก" (Ta Taek) | WONDERFRAME, วอร์ วนรัตน์, หยิ่น อานันท์ | |
| 2021 | "จีนี่ จ๋า" (Genie Ja) | บลอสซั่ม ชนัญชิดา, แก้ม วิชญาณี, หวาย ปัญญริสา, จิงจิง วริศรา | |
| 2021 | "ปั๊มป่าว?" (Pam Pao?) | BEN BIZZY | |
| 2021 | "ที่สุดของฉัน" (Thi Sut Khong Chan) | บลอสซั่ม ชนัญชิดา, แก้ม วิชญาณี, หวาย ปัญญริสา, จิงจิง วริศรา | |
| 2021 | "เพื่อนเล่น ไม่เล่นเพื่อน" (Just Being Friendly) | Tilly Birds | |
| 2021 | "ลำพัง" (Lamphang) | LAZYLOXY | |
| 2021 | "Say It" | JACKIE (Trinity) | |
| 2021 | "ฟาด" (Whip it!) | Tsunari | |
| 2021 | "Mirror Mirror" | F.HERO, Changbin (Stray Kids) | |
| 2021 | "อนาคตคือ" (Anakhot Khue) | YOUNGOHM | |
| 2021 | "แค่เพื่อนเท่านั้นสิ่งที่เธอให้กันมันก็แค่นี้ไงถ้าจะไม่รักก็ไม่ต้องให้ความหวัง" | GAVIN.D, K6Y | |
| 2024 | "Drama" | Atarashii Gakko! | |
| 2025 | "One Punch" | Valorant | |
| 2025 | "dance or dead" | Knock2 | |
| 2026 | SSAK (Prod. by GRAY) | OXYNOVA, MASON HOME, foggyatthebottom, OSUN, Loco | Show Me The Money 12 |

== Other works ==
=== Lyrics/rap/melody ===
- ร้าย (FIERCE) – หวาย
- MiNi HEART (มินิฮาร์ท) – Miya Thongchua
- Booty Bomb – 4EVE

=== Television ===
- The Graduates บัณฑิตเจ็บใหม่ (2021)
- Show Me The Money - Season 12 (2026)

=== Film ===
- Fast & Feel Love, directed by Nawapol Thamrongrattanarit (2022)

== Awards ==
| Award | Year | Category | Recipient | Result | Ref. |
|---|---|---|---|---|---|
| Kazz Awards | 2020 | Rising Star | Milli | Won | |
| Mnet Asian Music Awards | 2020 | Best New Asian Artist (Thailand) | Milli | Won | |
| Rap Is Now Awards | 2020 | Hip-Hop Song of the Year | "Phak Khon" | Won | |
| Rap Is Now Awards | 2020 | New Face of The Year | Milli | Won | |
| Rap Is Now Awards | 2021 | Artist of the Year | Milli | Nominated | |
| TOTY Music Awards 2022 | 2023 | SOLO Artist of the Year | | Nominated | |
| TOTY Music Awards 2022 | 2023 | Record of the Year | | Nominated | |
| TOTY Music Awards 2022 | 2023 | Album of the Year | BABB BUM BUM | Won | |
| TOTY Music Awards 2022 | 2023 | Best Artist of the Year | | Won | |
| TOTY Music Awards 2022 | 2023 | Producer of the Year | BABB BUM BUM | Won | |
