= List of busiest airports by cargo traffic =

The world's thirty busiest airports by cargo traffic for various periods (data provided by Airports Council International). Numbers listed refer to loaded and unloaded freight in tonnes, including transit freight.

== 2025 statistics ==
ACI's 2025 preliminary figures released in April 2026 are as follows.

Rank	Airport	Location	Code (IATA/ICAO)	Rank Change	Total Cargo (tonnes)	% Change
1.	Hong Kong International Airport	Chek Lap Kok, New Territories, Hong Kong	HKG/VHHH	Steady	5,070,256	▲2.7%
2.	(China) Shanghai Pudong International Airport	Pudong, Shanghai, China	PVG/ZSPD	Steady	4,096,016	▲8.6%
3.	(United States) Ted Stevens Anchorage International Airport	Anchorage, Alaska, United States	ANC/PANC	▲1	3,854,614	▲4.2%
4.	(United States) Louisville Muhammad Ali International Airport	Louisville, Kentucky, United States	SDF/KSDF	▲1	3,396,437	▲13.5%
5.	(United States) Miami International Airport	Miami, Florida, United States	MIA/KMIA	▲2	3,128,165	▲13.6%
6.	(United States) Memphis International Airport	Memphis, Tennessee, United States	MEM/KMEM	▼3	2,969,502	▼20.9%
7.	(South Korea) Incheon International Airport	Jung, Incheon, Seoul National Capital Area, South Korea	ICN/RKSI	▼1	2,954,684	▲0.3%
8.	(Qatar) Hamad International Airport	Doha, Qatar	DOH/OTHH	Steady	2,614,214	▼0.1%
9.	Taiwan Taoyuan International Airport	Dayuan, Taoyuan, Taiwan	TPE/RCTP	▲1	2,499,899	▲10.1%
10.	(China) Guangzhou Baiyun International Airport	Baiyun-Huadu, Guangzhou, Guangdong, China	CAN/ZGGG	▼1	2,439,248	▲2.4%

== 2024 final statistics ==
ACI's 2024 preliminary figures released in April 2025 are as follows.

Rank	Airport	Location	Code (IATA/ICAO)	Rank Change	Total Cargo (tonnes)	% Change
1.	Hong Kong International Airport	Chek Lap Kok, New Territories, Hong Kong	HKG/VHHH	Steady	4,938,211	▲14.1%
2.	(China) Shanghai Pudong International Airport	Pudong, Shanghai, China	PVG/ZSPD	▲1	3,778,331	▲9.8%
3.	(United States) Memphis International Airport	Memphis, Tennessee, United States	MEM/KMEM	▼1	3,754,236	▼3.3%
4.	(United States) Ted Stevens Anchorage International Airport	Anchorage, Alaska, United States	ANC/PANC	Steady	3,699,284	▲9.4%
5.	(United States) Louisville Muhammad Ali International Airport	Louisville, Kentucky, United States	SDF/KSDF	▲1	3,152,969	▲15.6%
6.	(South Korea) Incheon International Airport	Jung, Incheon, Seoul National Capital Area, South Korea	ICN/RKSI	▼1	2,946,902	▲7.4%
7.	(United States) Miami International Airport	Miami, Florida, United States	MIA/KMIA	Steady	2,753,450	▲9.0%
8.	(Qatar) Hamad International Airport	Doha, Qatar	DOH/OTHH	Steady	2,616,849	▲11.1%
9.	(China) Guangzhou Baiyun International Airport	Baiyun-Huadu, Guangzhou, Guangdong, China	CAN/ZGGG	▲2	2,373,727	▲16.9%
10.	Taiwan Taoyuan International Airport	Dayuan, Taoyuan, Taiwan	TPE/RCTP	Steady	2,270,974	▲7.5%

== 2023 final statistics ==
ACI's 2023 preliminary figures released in April 2024 are as follows.

Rank	Airport	Location	Code (IATA/ICAO)	Rank Change	Total Cargo (tonnes)	% Change
1.	Hong Kong International Airport	Chek Lap Kok, New Territories, Hong Kong	HKG/VHHH	Steady	4,331,976	▲3.2%
2.	(United States) Memphis International Airport	Memphis, Tennessee, United States	MEM/KMEM	Steady	3,881,211	▼4.0%
3.	(China) Shanghai Pudong International Airport	Pudong, Shanghai, China	PVG/ZSPD	▲1	3,440,084	▲10.4%
4.	(United States) Ted Stevens Anchorage International Airport	Anchorage, Alaska, United States	ANC/PANC	▼1	3,380,374	▼2.4%
5.	(South Korea) Incheon International Airport	Jung, Incheon, Seoul National Capital Area, South Korea	ICN/RKSI	▲1	2,744,136	▼6.9%
6.	(United States) Louisville Muhammad Ali International Airport	Louisville, Kentucky, United States	SDF/KSDF	▼1	2,727,820	▼11.1%
7.	(United States) Miami International Airport	Miami, Florida, United States	MIA/KMIA	▲1	2,525,591	▲1.0%
8.	(Qatar) Hamad International Airport	Doha, Qatar	DOH/OTHH	▲3	2,355,503	▲1.5%
9.	(United States) Los Angeles International Airport	Los Angeles, California, United States	LAX/KLAX	Steady	2,130,835	▼14.9%
10.	Taiwan Taoyuan International Airport	Dayuan, Taoyuan, Taiwan	TPE/RCTP	▼3	2,112,988	▼16.8%

== 2022 final statistics ==
ACI's 2022 preliminary figures released in April 2023 are as follows.

Rank	Airport	Location	Code (IATA/ICAO)	Rank Change	Total Cargo (tonnes)	% Change
1.	Hong Kong International Airport	Chek Lap Kok, New Territories, Hong Kong	HKG/VHHH	Steady	4,199,196	▼16.4%
2.	(United States) Memphis International Airport	Memphis, Tennessee, United States	MEM/KMEM	Steady	4,042,679	▼9.8%
3.	(United States) Ted Stevens Anchorage International Airport	Anchorage, Alaska, United States	ANC/PANC	▲1	3,461,603	▼4.3%
4.	(China) Shanghai Pudong International Airport	Pudong, Shanghai, China	PVG/ZSPD	▼1	3,117,216	▼21.7%
5.	(United States) Louisville Muhammad Ali International Airport	Louisville, Kentucky, United States	SDF/KSDF	▲1	3,067,234	▲0.5%
6.	(South Korea) Incheon International Airport	Jung, Incheon, Seoul National Capital Area, South Korea	ICN/RKSI	▼1	2,945,855	▼11.5%
7.	Taiwan Taoyuan International Airport	Dayuan, Taoyuan, Taiwan	TPE/RCTP	Steady	2,538,768	▼9.7%
8.	(United States) Miami International Airport	Miami, Florida, United States	MIA/KMIA	▲4	2,499,837	▼0.8%
9.	(United States) Los Angeles International Airport	Los Angeles, California, United States	LAX/KLAX	▼1	2,489,854	▼7.6%
10.	(Japan) Narita International Airport	Narita, Chiba, Japan	NRT/RJAA	▼1	2,399,298	▼9.3%

== 2021 final statistics ==
ACI's 2021 final figures released in July 2022 are as follows.

Rank	Airport	Location	Code (IATA/ICAO)	Rank Change	Total Cargo (tonnes)	% Change
1.	Hong Kong International Airport	Chek Lap Kok, New Territories, Hong Kong	HKG/VHHH	▲1	5,025,495	▲12.5%
2.	(United States) Memphis International Airport	Memphis, Tennessee, United States	MEM/KMEM	▼1	4,480,465	▼2.9%
3.	(China) Shanghai Pudong International Airport	Pudong, Shanghai, China	PVG/ZSPD	Steady	3,982,616	▲8.0%
4.	(United States) Ted Stevens Anchorage International Airport	Anchorage, Alaska, United States	ANC/PANC	Steady	3,555,160	▲12.6%
5.	(South Korea) Incheon International Airport	Jung, Incheon, Seoul National Capital Area, South Korea	ICN/RKSI	▲1	3,329,292	▲18.0%
6.	(United States) Louisville Muhammad Ali International Airport	Louisville, Kentucky, United States	SDF/KSDF	▼1	3,052,269	▲4.6%
7.	Taiwan Taoyuan International Airport	Dayuan, Taoyuan, Taiwan	TPE/RCTP	Steady	2,812,065	▲20.0%
8.	(United States) Los Angeles International Airport	Los Angeles, California, United States	LAX/KLAX	Steady	2,691,830	▲20.7%
9.	(Japan) Narita International Airport	Narita, Chiba, Japan	NRT/RJAA	▲2	2,644,074	▲31.1%
10.	(Qatar) Hamad International Airport	Doha, Qatar	DOH/OTHH	▼1	2,620,095	▲20.5%

== 2020 final statistics ==
ACI's 2020 final figures released in November 2021 are as follows.

Rank	Airport	Location	Code (IATA/ICAO)	Rank Change	Total Cargo (tonnes)	% Change
1.	(United States) Memphis International Airport	Memphis, Tennessee, United States	MEM/KMEM	▲1	4,613,431	▲6.7%
2.	Hong Kong International Airport	Chek Lap Kok, New Territories, Hong Kong	HKG/VHHH	▼1	4,468,089	▼7.1%
3.	(China) Shanghai Pudong International Airport	Pudong, Shanghai, China	PVG/ZSPD	Steady	3,686,627	▲1.4%
4.	(United States) Ted Stevens Anchorage International Airport	Anchorage, Alaska, United States	ANC/PANC	▲2	3,157,682	▲15.0%
5.	(United States) Louisville Muhammad Ali International Airport	Louisville, Kentucky, United States	SDF/KSDF	▼1	2,917,243	▲4.6%
6.	(South Korea) Incheon International Airport	Jung, Incheon, Seoul National Capital Area, South Korea	ICN/RKSI	▼1	2,822,370	▲2.1%
7.	Taiwan Taoyuan International Airport	Dayuan, Taoyuan, Taiwan	TPE/RCTP	▲2	2,342,714	▲7.4%
8.	(United States) Los Angeles International Airport	Los Angeles, California, United States	LAX/KLAX	▲5	2,229,476	▲6.6%
9.	(Qatar) Hamad International Airport	Doha, Qatar	DOH/OTHH	▼1	2,175,292	▼1.8%
10.	(United States) Miami International Airport	Miami, Florida, United States	MIA/KMIA	▲2	2,137,699	▲2.2%
	Aggregated top 10 airports				30,550,623	▲3.0%

== 2019 final statistics ==
ACI's 2019 preliminary figures released in May 2020 are as follows.

Rank	Airport	Location	Code (IATA/ICAO)	Rank Change	Total Cargo (tonnes)	% Change
1.	Hong Kong International Airport	Chek Lap Kok, New Territories, Hong Kong	HKG/VHHH	Steady	4,809,485	▼6.1%
2.	(United States) Memphis International Airport	Memphis, Tennessee, United States	MEM/KMEM	Steady	4,322,740	▼3.3%
3.	(China) Shanghai Pudong International Airport	Pudong, Shanghai, China	PVG/ZSPD	Steady	3,634,230	▼3.6%
4.	(United States) Louisville Muhammad Ali International Airport	Louisville, Kentucky, United States	SDF/KSDF	▲3	2,790,109	▲6.4%
5.	(South Korea) Incheon International Airport	Jung, Incheon, Seoul National Capital Area, South Korea	ICN/RKSI	▼1	2,764,369	▼6.4%
6.	(United States) Ted Stevens Anchorage International Airport	Anchorage, Alaska, United States	ANC/PANC	▼1	2,745,348	▼2.2%
7.	(United Arab Emirates) Dubai International Airport	Dubai, United Arab Emirates	DXB/OMDB	▼1	2,514,918	▼4.8%
8.	(Qatar) Hamad International Airport	Doha, Qatar	DOH/OTHH	▲3	2,215,804	▲0.8%
9.	Taiwan Taoyuan International Airport	Dayuan, Taoyuan, Taiwan	TPE/RCTP	▼1	2,182,342	▼6.1%
10.	(Japan) Narita International Airport	Narita, Chiba, Kantō, Japan	NRT/RJAA	▼1	2,104,063	▼6.9%
11.	(France) Charles de Gaulle Airport	Seine-et-Marne/Seine-Saint-Denis/Val-d'Oise, Île-de-France, France	CDG/LFPG	▲3	2,102,268	▼2.5%
12.	(United States) Miami International Airport	Miami, Florida, United States	MIA/KMIA	▲3	2,092,472	▼1.8%
13.	(Germany) Frankfurt am Main International Airport	Flughafen, Frankfurt, Hesse, Germany	FRA/EDDF	Steady	2,091,174	▼3.9%
14.	Singapore Changi Airport	Changi, East Region, Singapore	SIN/WSSS	▼2	2,056,700	▼6.3%
15.	(China) Beijing Capital International Airport	Chaoyang-Shunyi, Beijing, China	PEK/ZBAA	▲1	1,957,779	▼6.0%
16.	(China) Guangzhou Baiyun International Airport	Baiyun-Huadu, Guangzhou, Guangdong, China	CAN/ZGGG	▲1	1,922,132	▲1.7%
17.	(United States) O'Hare International Airport	Chicago, Illinois, United States	ORD/KORD	▲1	1,758,119	▼3.8%
18.	(United Kingdom) Heathrow Airport	Hayes, Hillingdon, Greater London, United Kingdom	LHR/EGLL	▲1	1,672,874	▼5.6%
19.	(Netherlands) Amsterdam Airport Schiphol	Haarlemmermeer, North Holland, Netherlands	AMS/EHAM	▲1	1,592,221	▼8.4%
20.	(Thailand) Suvarnabhumi International Airport	Racha Thewa, Bang Phli, Samut Prakan, Thailand	BKK/VTBS	▲1	1,326,914	▼11.2%

== 2018 final statistics ==
ACI's 2018 final figures released in September 2019 are as follows.

Rank	Airport	Location	Code (IATA/ICAO)	Rank Change	Total Cargo (tonnes)	% Change
1.	Hong Kong International Airport	Chek Lap Kok, New Territories, Hong Kong	HKG/VHHH	Steady	5,121,029	▲1.5%
2.	(United States) Memphis International Airport	Memphis, Tennessee, United States	MEM/KMEM	Steady	4,470,196	▲3.1%
3.	(China) Shanghai Pudong International Airport	Pudong, Shanghai, China	PVG/ZSPD	Steady	3,768,573	▼1.5%
4.	(South Korea) Incheon International Airport	Incheon, Seoul National Capital Area, South Korea	ICN/RKSI	Steady	2,952,123	▲1.0%
5.	(United States) Ted Stevens Anchorage International Airport	Anchorage, Alaska, United States	ANC/PANC	Steady	2,806,743	▲3.5%
6.	(United Arab Emirates) Dubai International Airport	Dubai, United Arab Emirates	DXB/OMDB	Steady	2,641,383	▼0.5%
7.	(United States) Louisville International Airport	Louisville, Kentucky, United States	SDF/KSDF	Steady	2,623,019	▲0.8%
8.	Taiwan Taoyuan International Airport	Dayuan, Taoyuan, Taiwan	TPE/RCTP	▲1	2,322,823	▲2.4%
9.	(Japan) Narita International Airport	Narita, Chiba, Kantō, Japan	NRT/RJAA	▼1	2,261,008	▼3.2%
10.	(United States) Los Angeles International Airport	Los Angeles, California, United States	LAX/KLAX	▲3	2,209,850	▲2.4%
11.	(Qatar) Hamad International Airport	Doha, Qatar	DOH/OTHH	▲5	2,198,308	▲8.8%
12.	Singapore Changi Airport	Changi, East Region, Singapore	SIN/WSSS	Steady	2,195,000	▲1.4%
13.	(Germany) Frankfurt am Main International Airport	Flughafen, Frankfurt, Hesse, Germany	FRA/EDDF	▼2	2,176,387	▼0.8%
14.	(France) Charles de Gaulle Airport	Seine-et-Marne/Seine-Saint-Denis/Val-d'Oise, Île-de-France, France	CDG/LFPG	▼4	2,156,327	▼1.8%
15.	(United States) Miami International Airport	Miami, Florida, United States	MIA/KMIA	▼1	2,129,658	▲2.8%
16.	(China) Beijing Capital International Airport	Chaoyang-Shunyi, Beijing, China	PEK/ZBAA	▼1	2,074,005	▲2.2%
17.	(China) Guangzhou Baiyun International Airport	Baiyun-Huadu, Guangzhou, Guangdong, China	CAN/ZGGG	▲1	1,890,816	▲6.2%
18.	(United States) Chicago O'Hare International Airport	Chicago, Illinois, United States	ORD/KORD	▲2	1,807,091	▲5.0%
19.	(United Kingdom) London Heathrow International Airport	Hayes, Hillingdon, Greater London, United Kingdom	LHR/EGLL	▼2	1,771,342	▼1.3%
20.	(Netherlands) Amsterdam Airport Schiphol	Haarlemmermeer, North Holland, Netherlands	AMS/EHAM	▼1	1,737,984	▼2.7%
	Total				51,313,665	▲1.4%

== 2017 final statistics ==
ACI's 2017 final figures are as follows.

Rank	Airport	Location	Code (IATA/ICAO)	Rank Change	Total Cargo (tonnes)	% Change
1.	Hong Kong International Airport	Chek Lap Kok, New Territories, Hong Kong	HKG/VHHH	Steady	5,049,898	▲9.4%
2.	(United States) Memphis International Airport	Memphis, Tennessee, United States	MEM/KMEM	Steady	4,336,752	▲0.3%
3.	(China) Shanghai Pudong International Airport	Pudong, Shanghai, China	PVG/ZSPD	Steady	3,824,280	▲11.2%
4.	(South Korea) Incheon International Airport	Incheon, Seoul National Capital Area, South Korea	ICN/RKSI	Steady	2,921,691	▲7.6%
5.	(United States) Ted Stevens Anchorage International Airport	Anchorage, Alaska, United States	ANC/PANC	▲1	2,713,230	▲6.7%
6.	(United Arab Emirates) Dubai International Airport	Dubai, United Arab Emirates	DXB/OMDB	▼1	2,654,494	▲2.40%
7.	(United States) Louisville International Airport	Louisville, Kentucky, United States	SDF/KSDF	Steady	2,602,695	▲6.80%
8.	(Japan) Narita International Airport	Narita, Chiba, Kantō, Japan	NRT/RJAA	Steady	2,336,427	▲7.9%
9.	Taiwan Taoyuan International Airport	Dayuan, Taoyuan, Taiwan	TPE/RCTP	▲2	2,269,585	▲8.2%
10.	(France) Charles de Gaulle Airport	Seine-et-Marne/Seine-Saint-Denis/Val-d'Oise, Île-de-France, France	CDG/LFPG	▼1	2,195,229	▲2.8%
11.	(Germany) Frankfurt am Main International Airport	Flughafen, Frankfurt, Hesse, Germany	FRA/EDDF	▼1	2,194,056	▲3.8%
12.	Singapore Changi Airport	Changi, East Region, Singapore	SIN/WSSS	▲1	2,164,700	▲7.9%
13.	(United States) Los Angeles International Airport	Los Angeles, California, United States	LAX/KLAX	▲1	2,158,324	▲8.1%
14.	(United States) Miami International Airport	Miami, Florida, United States	MIA/KMIA	▼2	2,071,722	▲2.9%
15.	(China) Beijing Capital International Airport	Chaoyang-Shunyi, Beijing, China	PEK/ZBAA	Steady	2,029,584	▲4.5%
16.	(Qatar) Hamad International Airport	Doha, Qatar	DOH/OTHH	Steady	2,020,942	▲15.0%
17.	(United Kingdom) London Heathrow International Airport	Hayes, Hillingdon, Greater London, United Kingdom	LHR/EGLL	▲2	1,794,276	▲9.4%
18.	(China) Guangzhou Baiyun International Airport	Baiyun-Huadu, Guangzhou, Guangdong, China	CAN/ZGGG	Steady	1,780,423	▲7.8%
19.	(Netherlands) Amsterdam Airport Schiphol	Haarlemmermeer, North Holland, Netherlands	AMS/EHAM	▼2	1,778,382	▲4.9%
20.	(United States) Chicago O'Hare International Airport	Chicago, Illinois, United States	ORD/KORD	Steady	1,721,807	▲12.6%

== 2016 final statistics ==
ACI's 2016 final figures are as follows.

Rank	Airport	Location	Code (IATA/ICAO)	Rank Change	Total Cargo (tonnes)	% Change
1.	Hong Kong International Airport	Chek Lap Kok, New Territories, Hong Kong	HKG/VHHH	Steady	4,615,241	▲3.48%
2.	(United States) Memphis International Airport	Memphis, Tennessee, United States	MEM/KMEM	Steady	4,322,071	▲0.73%
3.	(China) Shanghai Pudong International Airport	Pudong, Shanghai, China	PVG/ZSPD	Steady	3,440,280	▲5.04%
4.	(South Korea) Incheon International Airport	Incheon, Seoul National Capital Area, South Korea	ICN/RKSI	▲1	2,714,341	▲4.57%
5.	(United Arab Emirates) Dubai International Airport	Dubai, United Arab Emirates	DXB/OMDB	▲1	2,592,454	▲3.45%
6.	(United States) Ted Stevens Anchorage International Airport	Anchorage, Alaska, United States	ANC/PANC	▼2	2,542,526	▼3.35%
7.	(United States) Louisville International Airport	Louisville, Kentucky, United States	SDF/KSDF	Steady	2,437,010	▲3.67%
8.	(Japan) Narita International Airport	Narita, Chiba, Kantō, Japan	NRT/RJAA	Steady	2,165,427	▲2.03%
9.	(France) Charles de Gaulle Airport	Seine-et-Marne/Seine-Saint-Denis/Val-d'Oise, Île-de-France, France	CDG/LFPG	Steady	2,135,172	▲2.12%
10.	(Germany) Frankfurt am Main International Airport	Flughafen, Frankfurt, Hesse, Germany	FRA/EDDF	Steady	2,113,594	▲1.77%
11.	Taiwan Taoyuan International Airport	Dayuan, Taoyuan, Taiwan	TPE/RCTP	Steady	2,097,228	▲3.73%
12.	(United States) Miami International Airport	Miami, Florida, United States	MIA/KMIA	Steady	2,014,205	▲0.45%
13.	Singapore Changi Airport	Changi, East Region, Singapore	SIN/WSSS	▲2	2,006,300	▲6.32%
14.	(United States) Los Angeles International Airport	Los Angeles, California, United States	LAX/KLAX	▼1	1,993,308	▲2.94%
15.	(China) Beijing Capital International Airport	Chaoyang-Shunyi, Beijing, China	PEK/ZBAA	▼1	1,943,159	▲2.82%
16.	(Qatar) Hamad International Airport	Doha, Qatar	DOH/OTHH	▲4	1,758,074	▲20.83%
17.	(Netherlands) Amsterdam Airport Schiphol	Haarlemmermeer, North Holland, Netherlands	AMS/EHAM	▼1	1,694,729	▲2.38%
18.	(China) Guangzhou Baiyun International Airport	Baiyun-Huadu, Guangzhou, Guangdong, China	CAN/ZGGG	▲1	1,652,215	▲7.44%
19.	(United Kingdom) London Heathrow International Airport	Hayes, Hillingdon, Greater London, United Kingdom	LHR/EGLL	▼1	1,640,400	▲3.06%
20.	(United States) Chicago O'Hare International Airport	Chicago, Illinois, United States	ORD/KORD	▼3	1,528,136	▲0.17%

== 2015 statistics ==
ACI's 2015 figures are as follows.

Rank	Airport	Location	Code (IATA/ICAO)	Total Cargo (tonnes)	Rank Change	% Change
1.	Hong Kong International Airport	Chek Lap Kok, New Territories, Hong Kong	HKG/VHHH	4,422,227	Steady	▲0.4%
2.	(United States) Memphis International Airport	Memphis, Tennessee, United States	MEM/KMEM	4,290,638	Steady	▲0.8%
3.	(China) Shanghai Pudong International Airport	Pudong, Shanghai, China	PVG/ZSPD	3,275,231	Steady	▲2.9%
4.	(United States) Ted Stevens Anchorage International Airport	Anchorage, Alaska, United States	ANC/PANC	2,630,701	▲1	▲5.5%
5.	(South Korea) Incheon International Airport	Incheon, Seoul National Capital Area, South Korea	ICN/RKSI	2,595,678	▼1	▲1.5%
6.	(United Arab Emirates) Dubai International Airport	Dubai, United Arab Emirates	DXB/OMDB	2,506,092	Steady	▲3.4%
7.	(United States) Louisville International Airport	Louisville, Kentucky, United States	SDF/KSDF	2,350,656	Steady	▲2.5%
8.	(Japan) Narita International Airport	Narita, Chiba, Kantō, Japan	NRT/RJAA	2,122,134	Steady	▼0.6%
9.	(France) Charles de Gaulle Airport	Seine-et-Marne/Seine-Saint-Denis/Val-d'Oise, Île-de-France, France	CDG/LFPG	2,090,795	▼5	▲0.2%
10.	(Germany) Frankfurt am Main International Airport	Flughafen, Frankfurt, Hesse, Germany	FRA/EDDF	2,076,734	Steady	▼2.6%
11.	Taiwan Taoyuan International Airport	Dayuan, Taoyuan, Taiwan	TPE/RCTP	2,021,865	Steady	▼3.2%
12.	(United States) Miami International Airport	Miami, Florida, United States	MIA/KMIA	2,005,175	Steady	▲0.3%
13.	(United States) Los Angeles International Airport	Los Angeles, California, United States	LAX/KLAX	1,938,624	▲3	▲6.5%
14.	(China) Beijing Capital International Airport	Chaoyang-Shunyi, Beijing, China	PEK/ZBAA	1,889,829	▲1	▲2.2%
15.	Singapore Changi Airport	Changi, East Region, Singapore	SIN/WSSS	1,886,999	▼1	▲2.2%
16.	(Netherlands) Amsterdam Airport Schiphol	Haarlemmermeer, North Holland, Netherlands	AMS/EHAM	1,655,354	Steady	▼0.9%
17.	(United States) Chicago O'Hare International Airport	Chicago, Illinois, United States	ORD/KORD	1,592,826	Steady	▲15.6%
18.	(United Kingdom) London Heathrow International Airport	Hayes, Hillingdon, Greater London, United Kingdom	LHR/EGLL	1,591,637	Steady	▲0.2%
19.	(China) Guangzhou Baiyun International Airport	Baiyun-Huadu, Guangzhou, Guangdong, China	CAN/ZGGG	1,537,759	Steady	▲5.8%
20.	(Qatar) Hamad International Airport	Doha, Qatar	DOH/OTBD	1,454,952	▲4	▲46.0%
21.	(United States) John F. Kennedy International Airport	New York City, New York, United States	JFK/KJFK	1,286,484	▼1	▼0.8%
22.	(Thailand) Suvarnabhumi Airport	Racha Thewa, Bang Phli, Samut Prakan, Thailand	BKK/VTBS	1,230,563	▼1	▼0.1%
23.	(Japan) Tokyo Haneda Airport	Tokyo, Japan	HND/RJTT	1,171,311	▼1	▲6.7%
24.	(United States) Indianapolis International Airport	Indianapolis, Indiana, United States	IND/KIND	1,084,857	▼2	▼1.6%
25.	(China) Shenzhen Bao'an International Airport	Bao'an, Shenzhen, Guangdong, China	SZX/ZGSZ	1,013,691	▲1	▲5.2%
26.	(Germany) Leipzig/Halle Airport	Leipzig, Germany	LEJ/EDDP	984,389	Steady	▲8.6%
27.	(United Arab Emirates) Al Maktoum International Airport	Dubai, United Arab Emirates	DWC/OMDW	890,912	▲2	▲8.0%
28.	(United Arab Emirates) Abu Dhabi International Airport	Abu Dhabi, United Arab Emirates	AUH/OMAA	837,551	▼1	▲3.9%
29.	Luxembourg Findel Airport	Luxembourg City, Luxembourg	LUX/ELLX	779,478	▲6	▲5.8%
30.	(India) Indira Gandhi International Airport	Delhi, National Capital Region, India	DEL/VIDP	772,362	▲8	▲11.5%

== 2014 statistics ==
ACW's 2014 figures are as follows.

Rank	Airport	Location	Code (IATA/ICAO)	Total Cargo (tonnes)	Rank Change	% Change
1.	Hong Kong International Airport	Chek Lap Kok, New Territories, Hong Kong	HKG/VHHH	4,411,193	Steady	▲5.9%
2.	(United States) Memphis International Airport	Memphis, Tennessee, United States	MEM/KMEM	4,258,530	Steady	▲2.9%
3.	(China) Shanghai Pudong International Airport	Pudong, Shanghai, China	PVG/ZSPD	3,181,365	Steady	▲8.6%
4.	(South Korea) Incheon International Airport	Incheon, Seoul National Capital Area, South Korea	ICN/RKSI	2,557,680	Steady	▲3.8%
5.	(United States) Ted Stevens Anchorage International Airport	Anchorage, Alaska, United States	ANC/PANC	2,482,153	▲1	▲2.5%
6.	(United Arab Emirates) Dubai International Airport	Dubai, United Arab Emirates	DXB/OMDB	2,367,574	▼1	▼3.1%
7.	(United States) Louisville International Airport	Louisville, Kentucky, United States	SDF/KSDF	2,293,134	Steady	▲3.5%
8.	(Japan) Narita International Airport	Narita, Chiba, Kantō, Japan	NRT/RJAA	2,132,377	▲2	▲5.6%
9.	(Germany) Frankfurt Airport	Flughafen, Frankfurt, Hesse, Germany	FRA/EDDF	2,132,132	▼1	▲1.8%
10.	Taiwan Taoyuan International Airport	Dayuan, Taoyuan, Taiwan	TPE/RCTP	2,088,727	▲5	▲6.2%
11.	(United States) Miami International Airport	Miami, Florida, United States	MIA/KMIA	1,998,782	Steady	▲2.8%
12.	(France) Paris-Charles de Gaulle Airport	Seine-et-Marne/Seine-Saint-Denis/Val-d'Oise, Île-de-France, France	CDG/LFPG	1,890,829	▼3	▲0.8%
13.	Singapore Changi Airport	Changi, East Region, Singapore	SIN/WSSS	1,879,918	▼1	▲0.4%
14.	(China) Beijing Capital International Airport	Chaoyang-Shunyi, Beijing, China	PEK/ZBAA	1,831,167	▼1	▼0.6%
15.	(United States) Los Angeles International Airport	Los Angeles, California, United States	LAX/KLAX	1,818,766	▼1	▲3.7%
16.	(United States) O'Hare International Airport	Chicago, Illinois, United States	ORD/KORD	1,672,465	▲5	▲11.7%
17.	(Netherlands) Amsterdam Airport Schiphol	Haarlemmermeer, North Holland, Netherlands	AMS/EHAM	1,670,674	▼1	▲6.7%
18.	(United Kingdom) London Heathrow Airport	Hayes, Hillingdon, Greater London, United Kingdom	LHR/EGLL	1,588,652	▼1	▲4.9%
19.	(China) Guangzhou Baiyun International Airport	Baiyun-Huadu, Guangzhou, Guangdong, China	CAN/ZGGG	1,454,044	▼1	▲11.0%
20.	(United States) John F. Kennedy International Airport	New York City, New York, United States	JFK/KJFK	1,315,590	▼1	▲1.9%
21.	(Thailand) Suvarnabhumi Airport	Racha Thewa, Bang Phli, Samut Prakan, Thailand	BKK/VTBS	1,231,445	▼1	▼0.4%
22.	(Japan) Tokyo Haneda Airport	Tokyo, Japan	HND/RJTT	1,098,182	▲1	▲15.1%
23.	(United States) Indianapolis International Airport	Indianapolis, Indiana, United States	IND/KIND	999,149	▼1	▲0.7%
24.	(Qatar) Hamad International Airport	Doha, Qatar	DOH/OTBD	995,370	▲1	▲12.7%
25.	(China) Shenzhen Bao'an International Airport	Bao'an, Shenzhen, Guangdong, China	SZX/ZGSZ	963,871	▼1	▲5.5%
26.	(Germany) Leipzig/Halle Airport	Leipzig, Germany	LEJ/EDDP	906,490	Steady	▲3.2%
27.	(United Arab Emirates) Abu Dhabi International Airport	Abu Dhabi, United Arab Emirates	AUH/OMAA	806,068	▲2	▲13.1%
28.	(Malaysia) Kuala Lumpur International Airport	Sepang, Selangor, Malaysia	KUL/WMKK	776,727	Steady	▲8.7%
29.	(United Arab Emirates) Al Maktoum International Airport	Dubai, United Arab Emirates	DWC/OMDW	758,371	▲?	▲?%
30.	(Japan) Kansai International Airport	Osaka, Japan	KIX/RJBB	745,895	Steady	▲9.3%

== 2013 preliminary statistics ==
ACI's 2013 preliminary full year figures are as follows.

Rank	Airport	Location	Code (IATA/ICAO)	Total Cargo (tonnes)	Rank Change	% Change
1.	Hong Kong International Airport	Chek Lap Kok, New Territories, Hong Kong	HKG/VHHH	4,161,718	Steady	▲2.3%
2.	(United States) Memphis International Airport	Memphis, Tennessee, United States	MEM/KMEM	4,137,801	Steady	▲3.0%
3.	(China) Shanghai Pudong International Airport	Pudong, Shanghai, China	PVG/ZSPD	2,928,527	Steady	▼0.3%
4.	(South Korea) Incheon International Airport	Incheon, Seoul National Capital Area, South Korea	ICN/RKSI	2,464,384	Steady	▲0.3%
5.	(United Arab Emirates) Dubai International Airport	Dubai, United Arab Emirates	DXB/OMDB	2,435,567	▲1	▲6.8%
6.	(United States) Ted Stevens Anchorage International Airport	Anchorage, Alaska, United States	ANC/PANC	2,421,145	▼1	▼1.7%
7.	(United States) Louisville International Airport	Louisville, Kentucky, United States	SDF/KSDF	2,216,079	Steady	▲2.2%
8.	(Germany) Frankfurt Airport	Flughafen, Frankfurt, Hesse, Germany	FRA/EDDF	2,094,453	▲1	▲1.4%
9.	(France) Paris-Charles de Gaulle Airport	Seine-et-Marne/Seine-Saint-Denis/Val-d'Oise, Île-de-France, France	CDG/LFPG	2,069,200	▼1	▼3.8%
10.	(Japan) Narita International Airport	Narita, Chiba, Kantō, Japan	NRT/RJAA	2,019,844	Steady	▲0.7%
11.	(United States) Miami International Airport	Miami, Florida, United States	MIA/KMIA	1,945,012	Steady	▲0.8%
12.	Singapore Changi Airport	Changi, East Region, Singapore	SIN/WSSS	1,885,978	Steady	▲0.8%
13.	(China) Beijing Capital International Airport	Chaoyang-Shunyi, Beijing, China	PEK/ZBAA	1,843,681	Steady	▲2.4%
14.	(United States) Los Angeles International Airport	Los Angeles, California, United States	LAX/KLAX	1,747,284	Steady	▼1.9%
15.	Taiwan Taoyuan International Airport	Dayuan, Taoyuan, Taiwan	TPE/RCTP	1,571,814	Steady	▼0.4%
16.	(Netherlands) Amsterdam Airport Schiphol	Haarlemmermeer, North Holland, Netherlands	AMS/EHAM	1,565,961	▲2	▲3.6%
17.	(United Kingdom) London Heathrow Airport	Hayes, Hillingdon, Greater London, United Kingdom	LHR/EGLL	1,515,056	▼1	▼2.6%
18.	(China) Guangzhou Baiyun International Airport	Baiyun-Huadu, Guangzhou, Guangdong, China	CAN/ZGGG	1,309,746	▲3	▲4.9%
19.	(United States) John F. Kennedy International Airport	New York City, New York, United States	JFK/KJFK	1,295,473	▲1	▲0.8%
20.	(Thailand) Suvarnabhumi Airport	Racha Thewa, Bang Phli, Samut Prakan, Thailand	BKK/VTBS	1,236,223	▼1	▼8.1%
21.	(United States) O'Hare International Airport	Chicago, Illinois, United States	ORD/KORD	1,228,791	▼4	▼2.0%
22.	(United States) Indianapolis International Airport	Indianapolis, Indiana, United States	IND/KIND	991,307	Steady	▲7.5%
23.	(Japan) Tokyo International Airport	Tokyo, Japan	HND/RJTT	954,446	Steady	▲4.9%
24.	(China) Shenzhen Bao'an International Airport	Bao'an, Shenzhen, Guangdong, China	SZX/ZGSZ	913,472	Steady	▲6.9%
25.	(Qatar) Doha International Airport	Doha, Qatar	DOH/OTBD	883,264	▲1	▲4.6%
26.	(Germany) Leipzig/Halle Airport	Leipzig, Germany	LEJ/EDDP	878,024	▼1	▲3.8%
27.	(Germany) Cologne Bonn Airport	Cologne, Germany	CGN/EDDK	717,146	▲1	▼1.8%
28.	(Malaysia) Kuala Lumpur International Airport	Sepang, Selangor, Malaysia	KUL/WMKK	713,254	▲2	▲1.6%
29.	(United Arab Emirates) Abu Dhabi International Airport	Abu Dhabi, United Arab Emirates	AUH/OMAA	712,488	▲?	▲24.1%
30.	(Japan) Kansai International Airport	Osaka, Japan	KIX/RJBB	682,338	▼1	▼5.6%

1. Volume includes transit freight

== 2012 preliminary statistics ==
ACI's 2012 preliminary full year figures are as follows.

Rank	Airport	Location	Code (IATA/ICAO)	Total Cargo (tonnes)	Rank Change	% Change
1.	Hong Kong International Airport	Chek Lap Kok, New Territories, Hong Kong	HKG/VHHH	4,062,261	Steady	▲2.2%
2.	Memphis International Airport	Memphis, Tennessee, United States	MEM/KMEM	3,916,535	Steady	▲2.5%
3.	Shanghai Pudong International Airport	Pudong, Shanghai, China	PVG/ZSPD	2,939,157	Steady	▼5.3%
4.	Incheon International Airport	Incheon, Seoul National Capital Area, South Korea	ICN/RKSI	2,456,724	▲1	▼3.3%
5.	Ted Stevens Anchorage International Airport	Anchorage, Alaska, United States	ANC/PANC	2,449,551	▼1	▼3.7%
6.	Dubai International Airport	Dubai, United Arab Emirates	DXB/OMDB	2,267,365	Steady	▲3.1%
7.	Louisville International Airport	Louisville, Kentucky, United States	SDF/KSDF	2,187,766	▲1	▼0.9%
8.	Paris-Charles de Gaulle Airport	Seine-et-Marne/Seine-Saint-Denis/Val-d'Oise, Île-de-France, France	CDG/LFPG	2,150,950	▲1	▼6.5%
9.	Frankfurt Airport	Flughafen, Frankfurt, Hesse, Germany	FRA/EDDF	2,066,432	▼2	▼6.7%
10.	Narita International Airport	Narita, Chiba, Kantō, Japan	NRT/RJAA	2,006,173	Steady	▲3.1%
11.	Miami International Airport	Miami, Florida, United States	MIA/KMIA	1,929,889	▲1	▲4.9%
12.	Singapore Changi Airport	Changi, East Region, Singapore	SIN/WSSS	1,898,850	▼1	▼3.0%
13.	Beijing Capital International Airport	Chaoyang-Shunyi, Beijing, China	PEK/ZBAA	1,787,027	▲1	▲6.0%
14.	Los Angeles International Airport	Los Angeles, California, United States	LAX/KLAX	1,688,351	▼1	▲3.7%
15.	Taiwan Taoyuan International Airport	Dayuan, Taoyuan, Taiwan	TPE/RCTP	1,577,728	Steady	▼3.1%
16.	London Heathrow Airport	Hayes, Hillingdon, Greater London, United Kingdom	LHR/EGLL	1,556,203	Steady	▼0.7%
17.	O'Hare International Airport	Chicago, Illinois, United States	ORD/KORD	1,512,186	▲1	▼3.0%
18.	Amsterdam Airport Schiphol	Haarlemmermeer, North Holland, Netherlands	AMS/EHAM	1,511,824	▼1	▼2.4%
19.	Suvarnabhumi Airport	Racha Thewa, Bang Phli, Samut Prakan, Thailand	BKK/VTBS	1,345,487	▲1	▲1.8%
20.	John F. Kennedy International Airport	New York City, New York, United States	JFK/KJFK	1,283,663	▼1	▼5.5%
21.	Guangzhou Baiyun International Airport	Baiyun-Huadu, Guangzhou, Guangdong, China	CAN/ZGGG	1,246,467	Steady	▲5.6%
22.	Indianapolis International Airport	Indianapolis, Indiana, United States	IND/KIND	932,105	Steady	▼2.7%
23.	Tokyo International Airport	Tokyo, Japan	HND/RJTT	909,684	Steady	▲3.6%
24.	Shenzhen Bao'an International Airport	Bao'an, Shenzhen, Guangdong, China	SZX/ZGSZ	854,901	Steady	▲3.5%
25.	Leipzig/Halle Airport	Leipzig, Germany	LEJ/EDDP	846,092	▲2	▲13.7%
26.	Doha International Airport	Doha, Qatar	DOH/OTBD	844,532	▼1	▲4.5%
27.	Newark Liberty International Airport	Newark, New Jersey, United States	EWR/KEWR	743,762	▼1	▼7.5%
28.	Cologne Bonn Airport	Cologne, Germany	CGN/EDDK	730,054	▲1	▲0.5%
29.	Kansai International Airport	Osaka, Japan	KIX/RJBB	723,148	▼1	▼2.7%
30.	Kuala Lumpur International Airport	Sepang, Selangor, Malaysia	KUL/WMKK	702,227	Steady	▼0.1%

1. Volume includes transit freight

== 2011 preliminary statistics ==
ACI's 2011 preliminary full year figures are as follows.

Rank	Airport	Location	Code (IATA/ICAO)	Total Cargo (tonnes)	Rank Change	% Change
1.	Hong Kong International Airport	Chek Lap Kok, New Territories, Hong Kong	HKG/VHHH	3,968,397	Steady	▼4.7%
2.	Memphis International Airport	Memphis, Tennessee, United States	MEM/KMEM	3,916,535	Steady	▼0.0%
3.	Shanghai Pudong International Airport	Pudong, Shanghai, China	PVG/ZSPD	3,103,030	Steady	▼4.3%
4.	Ted Stevens Anchorage International Airport	Anchorage, Alaska, United States	ANC/PANC	2,625,201	▲1	▲0.5%
5.	Incheon International Airport	Incheon, Seoul National Capital Area, South Korea	ICN/RKSI	2,539,222	▼1	▼5.4%
6.	Dubai International Airport	Dubai, United Arab Emirates	DXB/OMDB	2,269,768	▲2	▲0.0%
7.	Frankfurt Airport	Flughafen, Frankfurt, Hesse, Germany	FRA/EDDF	2,215,181	▼1	▼2.6%
8.	Louisville International Airport	Louisville, Kentucky, United States	SDF/KSDF	2,187,766	▲2	▲1.0%
9.	Paris-Charles de Gaulle Airport	Seine-et-Marne/Seine-Saint-Denis/Val-d'Oise, Île-de-France, France	CDG/LFPG	2,095,733	▼2	▼4.0%
10.	Narita International Airport	Narita, Chiba, Kantō, Japan	NRT/RJAA	1,945,110	▼1	▼10.3%
11.	Singapore Changi Airport	Changi, East Region, Singapore	SIN/WSSS	1,898,850	Steady	▲3.1%
12.	Miami International Airport	Miami, Florida, United States	MIA/KMIA	1,840,231	Steady	▲0.2%
13.	Los Angeles International Airport	Los Angeles, California, United States	LAX/KLAX	1,688,351	Steady	▼7.2%
14.	Beijing Capital International Airport	Chaoyang-Shunyi, Beijing, China	PEK/ZBAA	1,668,751	▲2	▲7.7%
15.	Taiwan Taoyuan International Airport	Dayuan, Taoyuan, Taiwan	TPE/RCTP	1,627,461	▼1	▼7.9%
16.	London Heathrow Airport	Hayes, Hillingdon, Greater London, United Kingdom	LHR/EGLL	1,569,450	▼1	▲1.2%
17.	Amsterdam Airport Schiphol	Haarlemmermeer, North Holland, Netherlands	AMS/EHAM	1,549,686	Steady	▲0.8%
18.	O'Hare International Airport	Chicago, Illinois, United States	ORD/KORD	1,506,117	Steady	▲1.0%
19.	John F. Kennedy International Airport	New York City, New York, United States	JFK/KJFK	1,351,259	Steady	▲0.1%
20.	Suvarnabhumi Airport	Racha Thewa, Bang Phli, Samut Prakan, Thailand	BKK/VTBS	1,321,842	Steady	▲0.9%
21.	Guangzhou Baiyun International Airport	Baiyun-Huadu, Guangzhou, Guangdong, China	CAN/ZGGG	1,193,036	Steady	▲4.2%
22.	Indianapolis International Airport	Indianapolis, Indiana, United States	IND/KIND	907,594	Steady	▼4.2%
23.	Tokyo International Airport	Tokyo, Japan	HND/RJTT	873,016	▲2	▲6.7%
24.	Shenzhen Bao'an International Airport	Bao'an, Shenzhen, Guangdong, China	SZX/ZGSZ	826,022	Steady	▲2.1%
25.	Doha International Airport	Doha, Qatar	DOH/OTBD	808,099	▲2	▲14.2%
26.	Newark Liberty International Airport	Newark, New Jersey, United States	EWR/KEWR	807,202	▼3	▼6.0%
27.	Leipzig/Halle Airport	Leipzig, Germany	LEJ/EDDP	743,981	▲?	▲16.5%
28.	Kansai International Airport	Osaka, Japan	KIX/RJBB	759,278	▼2	▼2.1%
29.	Cologne Bonn Airport	Cologne, Germany	CGN/EDDK	726,259	▲?	▲12.8%
30.	Kuala Lumpur International Airport	Sepang, Selangor, Malaysia	KUL/WMKK	702,116	▼1	▲0.7%

1. Volume includes transit freight

== 2010 preliminary statistics ==
ACI's 2010 preliminary full year figures are as follows.

Rank	Airport	Location	Code (IATA/ICAO)	Total Cargo (tonnes)	Rank Change	% Change
1.	Hong Kong International Airport	Chek Lap Kok, New Territories, Hong Kong	HKG/VHHH	4,168,394	▲1	▲23.2%
2.	Memphis International Airport	Memphis, Tennessee, United States	MEM/KMEM	3,916,937	▼1	▲5.9%
3.	Shanghai Pudong International Airport	Pudong, Shanghai, China	PVG/ZSPD	3,227,914	Steady	▲27.1%
4.	Incheon International Airport	Incheon, Seoul National Capital Area, South Korea	ICN/RKSI	2,684,500	Steady	▲16.1%
5.	Ted Stevens Anchorage International Airport	Anchorage, Alaska, United States	ANC/PANC	2,578,396	▲1	▲33.1%
6.	Frankfurt Airport	Flughafen, Frankfurt, Hesse, Germany	FRA/EDDF	2,475,106	▲2	▲20.5%
7.	Paris-Charles de Gaulle Airport	Seine-et-Marne/Seine-Saint-Denis/Val-d'Oise, Île-de-France, France	CDG/LFPG	2,399,067	▼1	▲16.8%
8.	Dubai International Airport	Dubai, United Arab Emirates	DXB/OMDB	2,270,498	Steady	▲17.8%
9.	Narita International Airport	Narita, Chiba, Kantō, Japan	NRT/RJAA	2,167,843	▲1	▲17.1%
10.	Louisville International Airport	Louisville, Kentucky, United States	SDF/KSDF	2,166,226	▼3	▲11.1%
11.	Singapore Changi Airport	Changi, East Region, Singapore	SIN/WSSS	1,841,004	Steady	▲10.9%
12.	Miami International Airport	Miami, Florida, United States	MIA/KMIA	1,835,793	Steady	▲17.9%
13.	Los Angeles International Airport	Los Angeles, California, United States	LAX/KLAX	1,810,345	Steady	▲15.5%
14.	Taiwan Taoyuan International Airport	Dayuan, Taoyuan, Taiwan	TPE/RCTP	1,767,075	▲1	▲30.1%
15.	London Heathrow Airport	Hayes, Hillingdon, Greater London, United Kingdom	LHR/EGLL	1,551,405	▲1	▲15.0%
16.	Beijing Capital International Airport	Chaoyang-Shunyi, Beijing, China	PEK/ZBAA	1,549,126	▼2	▲5.0%
17.	Amsterdam Airport Schiphol	Haarlemmermeer, North Holland, Netherlands	AMS/EHAM	1,538,135	Steady	▲16.8%
18.	O'Hare International Airport	Chicago, Illinois, United States	ORD/KORD	1,424,077	▲1	▲30.0%
19.	John F. Kennedy International Airport	New York City, New York, United States	JFK/KJFK	1,343,114	▼1	▲17.4%
20.	Suvarnabhumi Airport	Racha Thewa, Bang Phli, Samut Prakan, Thailand	BKK/VTBS	1,310,146	Steady	▲25.3%
21.	Guangzhou Baiyun International Airport	Baiyun-Huadu, Guangzhou, Guangdong, China	CAN/ZGGG	1,144,458	Steady	▲19.8%
22.	Indianapolis International Airport	Indianapolis, Indiana, United States	IND/KIND	947,279	Steady	▲5.2%
23.	Newark Liberty International Airport	Newark, New Jersey, United States	EWR/KEWR	854,750	▲1	▲9.6%
24.	Shenzhen Bao'an International Airport	Bao'an, Shenzhen, Guangdong, China	SZX/ZGSZ	809,363	▲3	▲33.6%
25.	Tokyo International Airport	Tokyo, Japan	HND/RJTT	804,995	▼1	▲1.9%
26.	Kansai International Airport	Osaka, Japan	KIX/RJBB	759,278	Steady	▲24.7%
27.	Doha International Airport	Doha, Qatar	DOH/OTBD	707,831	▲?	▲33.8%
28.	Luxembourg-Findel Airport	Luxembourg City, Luxembourg	LUX/ELLX	705,371	▼3	▲12.2%
29.	Kuala Lumpur International Airport	Sepang, Selangor, Malaysia	KUL/WMKK	697,015	▼1	▲15.6%
30.	Logan International Airport	Boston, Massachusetts, United States	BOS/KBOS	684,576	▲2	▲2.5%

1. Volume includes transit freight

== 2009 final statistics ==
ACI's 2009 final full year figures are as follows.

Rank	Airport	Location	Code (IATA/ICAO)	Total Cargo (tonnes)	Rank Change	% Change
1.	Memphis International Airport	Memphis, Tennessee, United States	MEM/KMEM	3,697,054	Steady	▲0.0%
2.	Hong Kong International Airport	Chek Lap Kok, New Territories, Hong Kong	HKG/VHHH	3,385,313	Steady	▼7.5%
3.	Shanghai Pudong International Airport	Pudong, Shanghai, China	PVG/ZSPD	2,543,394	Steady	▼2.3%
4.	Incheon International Airport	Incheon, Seoul National Capital Area, South Korea	ICN/RKSI	2,313,001	Steady	▼4.6%
5.	Paris-Charles de Gaulle Airport	Seine-et-Marne/Seine-Saint-Denis/Val-d'Oise, Île-de-France, France	CDG/LFPG	2,054,515	▲1	▼9.9%
6.	Ted Stevens Anchorage International Airport	Anchorage, Alaska, United States	ANC/PANC	1,994,629	▼1	▼15.0%
7.	Louisville International Airport	Louisville, Kentucky, United States	SDF/KSDF	1,949,528	▲2	▼1.3%
8.	Dubai International Airport	Dubai, United Arab Emirates	DXB/OMDB	1,927,520	▲3	▲5.6%
9.	Frankfurt Airport	Flughafen, Frankfurt, Hessen, Germany	FRA/EDDF	1,887,686	▼2	▼10.6%
10.	Narita International Airport	Narita, Chiba, Kantō, Japan	NRT/RJAA	1,851,972	▼2	▼11.8%
11.	Singapore Changi Airport	Changi, East Region, Singapore	SIN/WSSS	1,660,724	▼1	▼11.9%
12.	Miami International Airport	Miami, Florida, United States	MIA/KMIA	1,557,401	Steady	▼13.8%
13.	Los Angeles International Airport	Los Angeles, California, United States	LAX/KLAX	1,509,326	Steady	▼7.4%
14.	Beijing Capital International Airport	Chaoyang-Shunyi, Beijing, China	PEK/ZBAA	1,475,649	▲4	▲8.1%
15.	Taiwan Taoyuan International Airport	Dayuan, Taoyuan, Taiwan	TPE/RCTP	1,358,304	Steady	▼9.0%
16.	London Heathrow Airport	Hayes, Hillingdon, Greater London, United Kingdom	LHR/EGLL	1,349,571	Steady	▼9.2%
17.	Amsterdam Airport Schiphol	Haarlemmermeer, North Holland, Netherlands	AMS/EHAM	1,317,120	▼3	▼17.8%
18.	John F. Kennedy International Airport	New York City, New York, United States	JFK/KJFK	1,144,894	▼1	▼21.2%
19.	O'Hare International Airport	Chicago, Illinois, United States	ORD/KORD	1,047,917	Steady	▼17.1%
20.	Suvarnabhumi Airport	Racha Thewa, Bang Phli, Samut Prakan, Thailand	BKK/VTBS	1,045,194	Steady	▼10.9%
21.	Guangzhou Baiyun International Airport	Baiyun-Huadu, Guangzhou, Guangdong, China	CAN/ZGGG	955,270	▲5	▲39.3%
22.	Indianapolis International Airport	Indianapolis, Indiana, United States	IND/KIND	944,805	▼1	▼9.2%
23.	Newark Liberty International Airport	Newark, New Jersey, United States	EWR/KEWR	779,642	▼1	▼12.1%
24.	Tokyo International Airport	Tokyo, Japan	HND/RJTT	779,118	▼1	▼8.3%
25.	Logan International Airport	Boston, United States	BOS/KBOS	666,888	▲?	▲7.3%
26.	Luxembourg-Findel Airport	Luxembourg City, Luxembourg	LUX/ELLX	628,667	Steady	▼20.2%
27.	Kansai International Airport	Osaka, Japan	KIX/RJBB	608,876	▼2	▼28.0%
28.	Shenzhen Bao'an International Airport	Bao'an, Shenzhen, Guangdong, China	SZX/ZGSZ	605,469	▲?	▲1.2%
29.	Kuala Lumpur International Airport	Sepang, Selangor, Malaysia	KUL/WMKK	601,620	▼1	▼9.9%
30.	Dallas/Fort Worth International Airport	Dallas/Fort Worth, Texas, United States	DFW/KDFW	578,906	▼1	▼11.3%

1. Volume includes transit freight

== 2008 final statistics ==
ACI's 2008 final full year figures are as follows.

Rank	Airport	Location	Code (IATA/ICAO)	Total Cargo (tonnes)	Rank Change	% Change
1.	Memphis International Airport	Memphis, Tennessee, United States	MEM/KMEM	3,695,438	Steady	▼3.8%
2.	Hong Kong International Airport	Chek Lap Kok, New Territories, Hong Kong	HKG/VHHH	3,660,901	Steady	▼3.0%
3.	Shanghai Pudong International Airport	Pudong, Shanghai, China	PVG/ZSPD	2,602,916	▲1	▲1.7%
4.	Incheon International Airport	Incheon, Seoul National Capital Area, South Korea	ICN/RKSI	2,423,717	▲1	▼5.2%
5.	Ted Stevens Anchorage International Airport	Anchorage, Alaska, United States	ANC/PANC	2,339,831	▼2	▼17.2%
6.	Paris-Charles de Gaulle Airport	Seine-et-Marne/Seine-Saint-Denis/Val-d'Oise, Île-de-France, France	CDG/LFPG	2,280,050	Steady	▼0.8%
7.	Frankfurt Airport	Flughafen, Frankfurt, Hessen, Germany	FRA/EDDF	2,111,031	▲1	▼2.7%
8.	Narita International Airport	Narita, Chiba, Kantō, Japan	NRT/RJAA	2,100,448	▼1	▼6.8%
9.	Louisville International Airport	Louisville, Kentucky, United States	SDF/KSDF	1,974,276	Steady	▼5.0%
10.	Singapore Changi Airport	Changi, East Region, Singapore	SIN/WSSS	1,883,894	▲1	▼1.8%
11.	Dubai International Airport	Dubai, United Arab Emirates	DXB/OMDB	1,824,992	▲2	▲9.4%
12.	Miami International Airport	Miami, Florida, United States	MIA/KMIA	1,806,770	▼2	▼6.0%
13.	Los Angeles International Airport	Los Angeles, California, United States	LAX/KLAX	1,629,525	▼1	▼11.9%
14.	Amsterdam Airport Schiphol	Haarlemmermeer, North Holland, Netherlands	AMS/EHAM	1,602,585	Steady	▼3.0%
15.	Taiwan Taoyuan International Airport	Dayuan, Taoyuan, Taiwan	TPE/RCTP	1,493,120	▲1	▼7.0%
16.	London Heathrow Airport	Hayes, Hillingdon, Greater London, United Kingdom	LHR/EGLL	1,486,260	▲2	▲6.5%
17.	John F. Kennedy International Airport	New York City, New York, United States	JFK/KJFK	1,450,605	▼2	▼9.8%
18.	Beijing Capital International Airport	Chaoyang-Shunyi, Beijing, China	PEK/ZBAA	1,365,768	▲2	▲14.5%
19.	O'Hare International Airport	Chicago, Illinois, United States	ORD/KORD	1,332,123	▼2	▼13.1%
20.	Suvarnabhumi Airport	Racha Thewa, Bang Phli, Samut Prakan, Thailand	BKK/VTBS	1,173,084	▼1	▼3.9%
21.	Indianapolis International Airport	Indianapolis, Indiana, United States	IND/KIND	1,039,993	Steady	▼5.6%
22.	Newark Liberty International Airport	Newark, New Jersey, United States	EWR/KEWR	887,053	Steady	▼8.0%
23.	Tokyo International Airport	Tokyo, Japan	HND/RJTT	852,444	▲1	▼0.1%
24.	Kansai International Airport	Osaka, Japan	KIX/RJBB	845,497	▲1	▼0.1%
25.	Luxembourg-Findel Airport	Luxembourg City, Luxembourg	LUX/ELLX	788,224	▼2	▼8.0%
26.	Guangzhou Baiyun International Airport	Baiyun-Huadu, Guangzhou, Guangdong, China	CAN/ZGGG	685,868	▲4	▼1.3%
27.	Kuala Lumpur International Airport	Sepang, Selangor, Malaysia	KUL/WMKK	667,495	▲?	▲2.2%
28.	Dallas/Fort Worth International Airport	Dallas/Fort Worth, Texas, United States	DFW/KDFW	660,036	▼1	▼8.7%
29.	Brussels Airport	Zaventem, Brussels, Belgium	BRU/EBBR	659,054	▼3	▼11.8%
30.	Hartsfield-Jackson Atlanta International Airport	Atlanta, Georgia, United States	ATL/KATL	655,277	▼2	▼9.0%

1. Volume includes transit freight

== 2007 final statistics ==
ACI's final full year figures are as follows.

Rank	Airport	Location	Code (IATA/ICAO)	Total Cargo (tonnes)	Rank Change	% Change
1.	Memphis International Airport	Memphis, Tennessee, United States	MEM/KMEM	3,840,491	Steady	▲4.0%
2.	Hong Kong International Airport	Chek Lap Kok, New Territories, Hong Kong	HKG/VHHH	3,773,964	Steady	▲4.5%
3.	Ted Stevens Anchorage International Airport	Anchorage, Alaska, United States	ANC/PANC	2,825,511	Steady	▲0.6%
4.	Shanghai Pudong International Airport	Pudong, Shanghai, China	PVG/ZSPD	2,559,310	▲2	▲18.0%
5.	Incheon International Airport	Incheon, Seoul National Capital Area, South Korea	ICN/RKSI	2,555,580	▼1	▲9.4%
6.	Paris-Charles de Gaulle Airport	Seine-et-Marne/Seine-Saint-Denis/Val-d'Oise, Île-de-France, France	CDG/LFPG	2,297,896	▲1	▲7.9%
7.	Narita International Airport	Narita, Chiba, Kantō, Japan	NRT/RJAA	2,254,421	▼2	▼1.2%
8.	Frankfurt Airport	Flughafen, Frankfurt, Hesse, Germany	FRA/EDDF	2,127,464	Steady	▲8.4%
9.	Louisville International Airport	Louisville, Kentucky, United States	SDF/KSDF	2,078,947	Steady	▲4.8%
10.	Miami International Airport	Miami, Florida, United States	MIA/KMIA	1,922,985	▲2	▲5.1%
11.	Singapore Changi Airport	Changi, East Region, Singapore	SIN/WSSS	1,918,159	▼1	▼0.7%
12.	Los Angeles International Airport	Los Angeles, California, United States	LAX/KLAX	1,874,317	▼1	▼1.2%
13.	Dubai International Airport	Dubai, United Arab Emirates	DXB/OMDB	1,668,505	▲4	▲11.0%
14.	Amsterdam Airport Schiphol	Haarlemmermeer, North Holland, Netherlands	AMS/EHAM	1,651,385	▲1	▲5.4%
15.	John F. Kennedy International Airport	New York City, New York, United States	JFK/KJFK	1,607,050	▼1	▼1.9%
16.	Taiwan Taoyuan International Airport	Dayuan, Taoyuan, Taiwan	TPE/RCTP	1,605,681	▼3	▼5.5%
17.	O'Hare International Airport	Chicago, Illinois, United States	ORD/KORD	1,533,606	▼1	▼1.6%
18.	London Heathrow Airport	Hayes, Hillingdon, Greater London, United Kingdom	LHR/EGLL	1,395,905	Steady	▲3.9%
19.	Don Mueang Airport	Racha Thewa, Bang Phli, Samut Prakan, Thailand	BKK/VTBS	1,220,001	Steady	▲3.2%
20.	Beijing Capital International Airport	Chaoyang-Shunyi, Beijing, China	PEK/ZBAA	1,192,553	Steady	▲15.9%
21.	Indianapolis International Airport	Indianapolis, Indiana, United States	IND/KIND	998,675	Steady	▲1.1%
22.	Newark Liberty International Airport	Newark, New Jersey, United States	EWR/KEWR	963,794	Steady	▼0.6%
23.	Luxembourg-Findel Airport	Findel, Sandweiler, Luxembourg	LUX/ELLX	856,741	▲4	▲13.8%
24.	Tokyo International Airport	Tokyo, Japan	HND/RJTT	852,454	Steady	▲1.8%
25.	Kansai International Airport	Osaka, Japan	KIX/RJBB	845,976	▼2	▲0.5%
26.	Brussels Airport	Zaventem, Brussels, Belgium	BRU/EBBR	747,434	▲?	▲11.3%
27.	Dallas/Fort Worth International Airport	Dallas/Fort Worth, Texas, United States	DFW/KDFW	724,140	▼1	▼4.1%
28.	Hartsfield-Jackson Atlanta International Airport	Atlanta, Georgia, United States	ATL/KATL	720,209	Steady	▼3.5%
29.	Cologne Bonn Airport	Cologne/Bonn, North Rhine-Westphalia, Germany	CGN/EDDK	710,244	Steady	▲2.8%
30.	Guangzhou Baiyun International Airport	Baiyun-Huadu, Guangzhou, Guangdong, China	CAN/ZGGG	694,923	▼5	▲6.4%

1. Volume includes transit freight

== 2006 final statistics ==
ACI's final full year figures are as follows.

Rank	Airport	Location	Code (IATA/ICAO)	Total Cargo (tonnes)	Rank Change	% Change
1.	Memphis International Airport	Memphis, Tennessee, United States	MEM	3,692,081	1	▲2.6%
2.	Hong Kong International Airport	Chek Lap Kok, New Territories, Hong Kong	HKG	3,609,780	2	▲5.1%
3.	Ted Stevens Anchorage International Airport	Anchorage, Alaska, United States	ANC	2,691,395	3	▲5.4%
4.	Incheon International Airport	Incheon, South Korea	ICN	2,336,572	▲5	▲8.7%
5.	Narita International Airport	Narita, Chiba, Japan	NRT	2,280,830	▼4	▼0.5%
6.	Pudong International Airport	Pudong, Shanghai, China	PVG	2,168,122	▲9	▲16.8%
7.	Paris-Charles de Gaulle Airport	Paris, Île-de-France, France	CDG	2,130,724	▼6	▲6.0%
8.	Frankfurt Airport	Frankfurt, Hesse, Germany	FRA	2,127,646	▼7	▲8.4%
9.	Louisville International Airport	Louisville, Kentucky, United States	SDF	1,983,032	▲11	▲9.2%
10.	Singapore Changi Airport	Changi, East Region, Singapore	SIN	1,931,881	10	▲4.2%
11.	Los Angeles International Airport	Los Angeles, California, United States	LAX	1,907,497	▼8	▼1.6%
12.	Miami International Airport	Miami, Florida, United States	MIA	1,830,591	12	▲4.3%
13.	Taiwan Taoyuan International Airport	Dayuan, Taoyuan, Taiwan	TPE	1,698,808	13	▼0.4%
14.	John F. Kennedy International Airport	New York City, New York, United States	JFK	1,636,357	14	▲0.2%
15.	Amsterdam Airport Schiphol	Haarlemmermeer, North Holland, Netherlands	AMS	1,566,828	▲16	▲4.7%
16.	O'Hare International Airport	Chicago, Illinois, United States	ORD	1,558,235	▼15	▲0.8%
17.	Dubai International Airport	Dubai, United Arab Emirates	DXB	1,503,697	▲18	▲14.3%
18.	London Heathrow Airport	Hayes, Greater London, United Kingdom	LHR	1,343,930	▼17	▼3.3%
19.	Don Mueang Airport	Don Mueang, Bangkok, Thailand	BKK	1,181,814	19	▲3.6%
20.	Beijing Capital International Airport	Chaoyang-Shunyi, Beijing, China	PEK	1,028,909	▲24	▲31.6%
21.	Indianapolis International Airport	Indianapolis, Indiana, United States	IND	987,449	▼20	▲0.2%
22.	Newark Liberty International Airport	Newark, New Jersey, United States	EWR	974,961	▼21	▲2.6%
23.	Kansai International Airport	Osaka, Japan	KIX	842,016	▼22	▼3.2%
24.	Tokyo International Airport	Tokyo, Japan	HND	837,262	▼23	▲4.8%
25.	Guangzhou Baiyun International Airport	Baiyun-Huadu, Guangzhou, Guangdong, China	CAN	824,907	▲26	▲9.9%
26.	Dallas/Fort Worth International Airport	Dallas/Fort Worth, Texas, United States	DFW	757,856	▲28	▲2.1%
27.	Luxembourg-Findel Airport	Luxembourg City, Luxembourg	LUX	752,676	27	▲1.3%
28.	Hartsfield-Jackson Atlanta International Airport	Atlanta, Georgia, United States	ATL	746,502	▼25	▼2.8%
29.	Cologne Bonn Airport	Cologne/Bonn, North Rhine-Westphalia, Germany	CGN	691,110	N/A	▲7.4%
30.	Kuala Lumpur International Airport	Sepang, Selangor, Malaysia	KUL	677,446	N/A	▲3.2%

1. Volume includes transit freight

== 2005 final statistics ==
ACI's final full year figures are as follows.

Rank	Airport	Location	Code (IATA/ICAO)	Total Cargo (tonnes)	Rank Change	% Change
1.	Memphis International Airport	Memphis, Tennessee, United States	MEM	3,598,500	Steady	▲1.2%
2.	Hong Kong International Airport	Chek Lap Kok, New Territories, Hong Kong	HKG	3,433,349	Steady	▲9.9%
3.	Ted Stevens Anchorage International Airport	Anchorage, Alaska, United States	ANC	2,553,937^{1}	▲4	▲13.4%
4.	Narita International Airport	Narita, Chiba, Japan	NRT	2,291,073	▼3	▼3.5%
5.	Incheon International Airport	Incheon, South Korea	ICN	2,150,140	Steady	▲0.7%
6.	Paris-Charles de Gaulle Airport	Paris, Île-de-France, France	CDG	2,010,361	▲7	▲7.2%
7.	Frankfurt Airport	Frankfurt, Hesse, Germany	FRA	1,962,927	▲8	▲6.7%
8.	Los Angeles International Airport	Los Angeles, California, United States	LAX	1,938,430	▼6	▲1.3%
9.	Pudong International Airport	Pudong, Shanghai, China	PVG	1,856,655	▲14	▲13.1%
10.	Singapore Changi Airport	Changi, East Region, Singapore	SIN	1,854,610	▼9	▲3.3%
11.	Louisville International Airport	Louisville, Kentucky, United States	SDF	1,815,155	Steady	▲4.3%
12.	Miami International Airport	Miami, Florida, United States	MIA	1,754,633	▼10	▼1.4%
13.	Chiang Kai-shek International Airport	Dayuan, Taoyuan, Taiwan	TPE	1,705,318	13	▲0.3%
14.	John F. Kennedy International Airport	New York City, New York, United States	JFK	1,660,717	12 (-2)	▼2.6%
15.	O'Hare International Airport	Chicago, Illinois, United States	ORD	1,546,153	15	▲4.8%
16.	Amsterdam Schiphol Airport	Amsterdam, North Holland, Netherlands	AMS	1,495,919	16	▲2.0%
17.	London Heathrow Airport	Hayes, Greater London, United Kingdom	LHR	1,389,589	17	▼1.6%
18.	Dubai International Airport	Dubai, United Arab Emirates	DXB	1,314,906	18	▲12.5%
19.	Don Mueang Airport	Don Mueang, Bangkok, Thailand	BKK	1,140,836	19	▲7.8%
20.	Indianapolis International Airport	Indianapolis, Indiana, United States	IND	985,457	21 (+1)	▲5.7%
21.	Newark Liberty International Airport	Newark, New Jersey, United States	EWR	949,933	20 (-1)	▼3.5%
22.	Kansai International Airport	Osaka, Japan	KIX	869,474	22	▼2.1%
23.	Tokyo International Airport	Tokyo, Japan	HND	799,073	24 (+1)	▲3.2%
24.	Beijing Capital International Airport	Chaoyang-Shunyi, Beijing, China	PEK	782,066	27 (+3)	▲17.0%
25.	Hartsfield-Jackson Atlanta International Airport	Atlanta, Georgia, United States	ATL	767,897	23 (-2)	▼10.8%
26.	Guangzhou Baiyun International Airport	Baiyun-Huadu, Guangzhou, Guangdong, China	CAN	750,555	30 (+4)	▲18.7%
27.	Luxembourg-Findel Airport	Sandweiler, Luxembourg	LUX	742,766	26 (-1)	▲4.2%
28.	Dallas/Fort Worth International Airport	Dallas/Fort Worth, Texas, United States	DFW	741,805	25 (-3)	▼0.1%
29.	Oakland International Airport	Oakland, California, United States	OAK	672,844	29	0.0%
30.	Brussels Airport	Brussels (Zaventem), Belgium	BRU	660,854	N/A	▲5.2%

1. Volume includes transit freight

== 2004 final statistics ==
ACI's final full year figures are as follows.

Rank	Airport	Location	Code (IATA/ICAO)	Total Cargo (tonnes)	Rank Change	% Change
1.	Memphis International Airport	Memphis, Tennessee, United States	MEM	3,554,575	1	+4.8%
2.	Hong Kong International Airport	Chek Lap Kok, New Territories, Hong Kong	HKG	3,119,008	2	+16.9%
3.	Narita International Airport	Narita, Chiba, Japan	NRT	2,373,133	3	+10.1%
4.	Ted Stevens Anchorage International Airport	Anchorage, Alaska, United States	ANC	2,252,911^{1}	4	+7.2%
5.	Incheon International Airport	Incheon, South Korea	ICN	2,133,444	5	+7.2%
6.	Los Angeles International Airport	Los Angeles, California, United States	LAX	1,913,676	6	+4.3%
7.	Paris-Charles de Gaulle Airport	Paris, Île-de-France, France	CDG	1,876,900	7	+4.3%
8.	Frankfurt Airport	Frankfurt, Hesse, Germany	FRA	1,838,894	8	+11.4%
9.	Singapore Changi Airport	Changi, East Region, Singapore	SIN	1,795,646	10 (+1)	+10.0%
10.	Miami International Airport	Miami, Florida, United States	MIA	1,778,902	9 (-1)	+8.6%
11.	Louisville International Airport	Louisville, Kentucky, United States	SDF	1,739,492	12 (+1)	+7.5%
12.	John F. Kennedy International Airport	New York City, New York, United States	JFK	1,706,468	11 (-1)	+3.1%
13.	Chiang Kai-shek International Airport	Dayuan, Taoyuan, Taiwan	TPE	1,701,020	14 (+1)	+13.4%
14.	Pudong International Airport	Pudong, Shanghai, China	PVG	1,642,176	17 (+3)	+38.1%
15.	O'Hare International Airport	Chicago, Illinois, United States	ORD	1,474,652	13 (-2)	-2.4%
16.	Amsterdam Schiphol Airport	Amsterdam, North Holland, Netherlands	AMS	1,467,204	15 (-1)	+8.4%
17.	London Heathrow Airport	Hayes, Greater London, United Kingdom	LHR	1,412,033	16 (-1)	+8.6%
18.	Dubai International Airport	Dubai, United Arab Emirates	DXB	1,169,286	18	+22.2%
19.	Don Mueang Airport	Don Mueang, Bangkok, Thailand	BKK	1,058,145	19	+11.3%
20.	Newark Liberty International Airport	Newark, New Jersey, United States	EWR	984,838	21 (+1)	+2.4%
21.	Indianapolis International Airport	Indianapolis, Indiana, United States	IND	932,449	20 (-1)	+5.9%
22.	Kansai International Airport	Osaka, Japan	KIX	887,819	23 (+1)	+11.9%
23.	Hartsfield-Jackson Atlanta International Airport	Atlanta, Georgia, United States	ATL	862,230	22 (-1)	+7.5%
24.	Tokyo International Airport (Haneda)	Tokyo, Japan	HND	774,113	24	+7.1%
25.	Dallas/Fort Worth International Airport	Dallas/Fort Worth, Texas, United States	DFW	742,289	25	+11.4%
26.	Luxembourg-Findel Airport	Sandweiler, Luxembourg	LUX	712,985	27 (+1)	+8.5%
27.	Logan International Airport	Boston, Massachusetts, United States	BOS	679,637	25 (-2)	+1.1%
28.	Beijing Capital International Airport	Chaoyang-Shunyi, Beijing, China	PEK	668,690	26 (-1)	+1.0%
29.	Kuala Lumpur International Airport	Sepang, Selangor, Malaysia	KUL	655,368	29 (+1)	+11.1%
30.	Oakland International Airport	Oakland, California, United States	OAK	644,753	28 (-1)	+7.9%

1. Volume includes transit freight

== 2003 final statistics ==
ACI's final full year figures are as follows.

Rank	Airport	Location	Code (IATA/ICAO)	Total Cargo (tonnes)	Rank Change	% Change
1.	Memphis International Airport	Memphis, Tennessee, United States	MEM	3,390,515	1	+0.0%
2.	Hong Kong International Airport	Chek Lap Kok, New Territories, Hong Kong	HKG	2,668,880	2	+6.6%
3.	Narita International Airport	Narita, Chiba, Japan	NRT	2,154,691	3	+7.6%
4.	Ted Stevens Anchorage International Airport	Anchorage, Alaska, United States	ANC	2,102,025^{1}	5 (+1)	+18.7%
5.	Incheon International Airport	Incheon, South Korea	ICN	1,843,055	6 (+1)	+8.0%
6.	Los Angeles International Airport	Los Angeles, California, United States	LAX	1,833,300	4 (-2)	+2.8%
7.	Paris-Charles de Gaulle Airport	Paris, Île-de-France, France	CDG	1,723,700	9 (+2)	+6.0%
8.	Frankfurt Airport	Frankfurt, Hesse, Germany	FRA	1,650,476	8	+1.2%
9.	Miami International Airport	Miami, Florida, United States	MIA	1,637,278	10 (+1)	+0.8%
10.	Singapore Changi Airport	Changi, East Region, Singapore	SIN	1,632,409	7 (-3)	+1.7%
11.	John F. Kennedy International Airport	New York City, New York, United States	JFK	1,626,722	11	2.5%
12.	Louisville International Airport	Louisville, Kentucky, United States	SDF	1,618,336	12	+6.2%
13.	O'Hare International Airport	Chicago, Illinois, United States	ORD	1,510,746	13	+2.5%
14.	Chiang Kai-shek International Airport	Dayuan, Taoyuan, Taiwan	TPE	1,500,071	14	+8.6%
15.	Amsterdam Schiphol Airport	Amsterdam, North Holland, Netherlands	AMS	1,353,760	16 (+1)	+5.1%
16.	London Heathrow Airport	Hayes, Greater London, United Kingdom	LHR	1,300,420	15 (-1)	+0.8%
17.	Pudong International Airport	Pudong, Shanghai, China	PVG	1,189,303	26 (+9)	+87.3%
18.	Dubai International Airport	Dubai, United Arab Emirates	DXB	956,795	21 (+3)	+21.9%
19.	Don Mueang Airport	Don Mueang, Bangkok, Thailand	BKK	950,136	17 (-2)	+0.7%
20.	Indianapolis International Airport	Indianapolis, Indiana, United States	IND	889,163	18 (-2)	+8.7%
21.	Newark Liberty International Airport	Newark, New Jersey, United States	EWR	874,641	19 (-2)	+2.0%
22.	Hartsfield-Jackson Atlanta International Airport	Atlanta, Georgia, United States	ATL	798,501	22	+8.8%
23.	Kansai International Airport	Osaka, Japan	KIX	793,478	20 (-3)	+1.5%
24.	Tokyo International Airport (Haneda)	Tokyo, Japan	HND	722,736	23 (-1)	+2.2%
25.	Logan International Airport	Boston, Massachusetts, United States	BOS	672,419	25	-3.3%
26.	Dallas/Fort Worth International Airport	Dallas/Fort Worth, Texas, United States	DFW	667,574	24 (-1)	+0.2%
27.	Beijing Capital International Airport	Chaoyang-Shunyi, Beijing, China	PEK	662,141	25 (-1)	+1.1%
28.	Luxembourg-Findel Airport	Luxembourg City, Luxembourg	LUX	657,254	30 (+3)	+19.5%
29.	Oakland International Airport	Oakland, California, United States	OAK	597,383	27 (-1)	+5.9%
30.	Kuala Lumpur International Airport	Sepang, Selangor, Malaysia	KUL	589,982	N/A	+10.9%

1. Volume includes transit freight

== 2002 final statistics ==
ACI's final full year figures are as follows.

Rank	Airport	Location	Code (IATA/ICAO)	Total Cargo (tonnes)
1.	Memphis International Airport	Memphis, Tennessee, United States	MEM	3,390,800
2.	Hong Kong International Airport	Chek Lap Kok, New Territories, Hong Kong	HKG	2,504,584
3.	Narita International Airport	Narita, Chiba, Japan	NRT	2,001,822
4.	Los Angeles International Airport	Los Angeles, California, United States	LAX	1,779,855
5.	Ted Stevens Anchorage International Airport	Anchorage, Alaska, United States	ANC	1,771,595^{1}
6.	Incheon International Airport	Incheon, South Korea	ICN	1,705,880
7.	Singapore Changi Airport	Changi, East Region, Singapore	SIN	1,660,404
8.	Frankfurt Airport	Frankfurt, Hesse, Germany	FRA	1,631,322
9.	Paris-Charles de Gaulle Airport	Paris, Île-de-France, France	CDG	1,626,400
10.	Miami International Airport	Miami, Florida, United States	MIA	1,624,242
11.	John F. Kennedy International Airport	New York City, New York, United States	JFK	1,589,648
12.	Louisville International Airport	Louisville, Kentucky, United States	SDF	1,524,181
13.	O'Hare International Airport	Chicago, Illinois, United States	ORD	1,473,980
14.	Chiang Kai-shek International Airport	Dayuan, Taoyuan, Taiwan	TPE	1,380,748
15.	London Heathrow Airport	Hayes, Greater London, United Kingdom	LHR	1,310,615
16.	Amsterdam Schiphol Airport	Amsterdam, North Holland, Netherlands	AMS	1,288,626
17.	Don Mueang Airport	Don Mueang, Bangkok, Thailand	BKK	956,790
18.	Indianapolis International Airport	Indianapolis, Indiana, United States	IND	901,917
19.	Newark Liberty International Airport	Newark, New Jersey, United States	EWR	850,050
20.	Kansai International Airport	Osaka, Japan	KIX	805,430
21.	Dubai International Airport	Dubai, United Arab Emirates	DXB	784,997
22.	Hartsfield-Jackson Atlanta International Airport	Atlanta, Georgia, United States	ATL	734,083
23.	Tokyo International Airport (Haneda)	Tokyo, Japan	HND	707,301
24.	Logan International Airport	Boston, Massachusetts, United States	BOS	694,805
25.	Dallas/Fort Worth International Airport	Dallas/Fort Worth, Texas, United States	DFW	670,310
26.	Beijing Capital International Airport	Chaoyang-Shunyi, Beijing, China	PEK	669,347
27.	Pudong International Airport	Pudong, Shanghai, China	PVG	634,966
28.	Oakland International Airport	Oakland, California, United States	OAK	634,643
29.	Guangzhou Baiyun International Airport	Baiyun-Huadu, Guangzhou, Guangdong, China	CAN	592,559
30.	San Francisco International Airport	San Francisco, California, United States	SFO	589,730

1. Volume includes transit freight

== See also ==
- List of busiest airports by international passenger traffic
- List of busiest airports by passenger traffic
- List of busiest airports by aircraft movements
- List of largest cargo airports in the United States
