= Lee Hwi-min =

South Korean record producer

Lee Hwi-min 이휘민
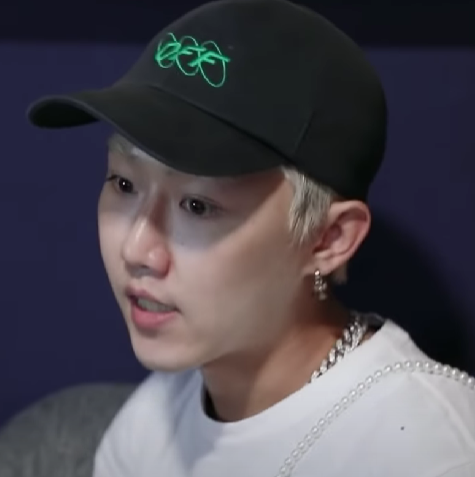
- Lee in 2020

Background information
- Also known as: Lil Moshpit
- Born: August 5, 1994 (age 32); Incheon, South Korea
- Genre: Hip hop
- Occupation: Record producer
- Years active: 2016-present
- Label: H1ghr Music
- Member of: GroovyRoom

Lee Hwi-min (Korean: 이휘민; born August 5, 1994), also known as Lil Moshpit (Korean: 릴 모쉬핏), is a South Korean record producer. He is a member of GroovyRoom. In 2022, he released solo album AAA which won Hip Hop Album of the Year at the Korean Hip-hop Awards. In 2025, he released K-Flip with Sik-K which won Best Rap & Hip-hop Album at the Korean Music Awards.

== Early life ==
Lee was born in Incheon. He became interested in hip hop after listening to Double K's album in fourth grade. He began writing songs in the third year of high school.

He adopted the name "Lil Moshpit" because he likes to moshpit with his friends at festivals and clubs.

== Career ==
In 2022, Lee released his solo album AAA under the name Lil Moshpit, which won Hip Hop Album of the Year at the Korean Hip-hop Awards. In 2023, he released EP Fleeky Season with Fleeky Bang. In 2025, he released collaboration album K-Flip with Sik-K. It won Best Rap & Hip-hop Album at the Korean Music Awards.

== Artistry ==
Lee incorporates hip-hop, pop, and R&B while working as a member of Groovyroom but focuses more on hip-hop as Lil Moshpit.

== Discography ==
=== Studio album ===
- AAA (2022)

=== Collaboration albums ===
- Fleeky Season (2023)
- K-Flip (2025)

== Filmography ==
=== TV ===
Year	Title	Role	Ref.
2026	Show Me the Money 12	Judge and producer	

== Awards and nominations ==
Award	Year	Nominee	Category	Result	Ref.
Korean Music Awards	2026	K-Flip+	Best Rap & Hip-hop Album	Won	
Korean Music Awards	2026	"Lov3"	Best Rap & Hip-hop Song	Won	
Korean Hip-hop Awards	2023	AAA	Hip Hop Album of the Year	Won	
Korean Hip-hop Awards	2023	"Yooooo"	Hip Hop Track of the Year	Nominated	
Korean Hip-hop Awards	2023	"Yooooo"	Collaboration of the Year	Nominated	
Korean Hip-hop Awards	2023	Himself	Producer of the Year	Nominated	
