= AAA (Lee Hwi-min album) =

Studio album by Lee Hwi-min
- Released: April 1, 2022
- Genre: Hip hop
- Length: 26:30
- Label: H1ghr

Lee Hwi-min chronology
AAA (2022)	Fleeky Season (2023)

AAA is the debut studio album of South Korean record producer Lee Hwi-min. It was released on April 1, 2022, through H1ghr Music. It later won Hip-hop Album of the Year at the Korean Hip-hop Awards.

== Background ==
In an interview with Dingo Freestyle, Lee explained the meaning of the album.

"AAA", which stands for "Access All Area", is the slogan of the label "Area". Anyone with the name tag "AAA" can go anywhere during concerts. It's like a free pass to go anywhere, whether it's a waiting room or a sound room. Similarly, I want to be a producer when I want to and I want to film a video when I want to. I think it's an album that I made with the feeling of "I'll do those without restriction."

== Release ==
On March 30, 2022, H1ghr Music announced the expiration of Lee's exclusive contract on Instagram. However, it turned out to be an April Fools' Day prank. On April 1, the tracklist and featuring artists of the album were revealed.

== Music and lyrics ==
Lee sets a "gloomy and rough" mood and adds flair to the album by reflecting foreign trends. "Moshpit Only" features a Pi'erre Bourne-style trap beat and Paul Blanco's "confident" rap.

== Critical reception ==
Hwang Du-ha of Rhythmer rated the album 3.5 out of 5 stars. He wrote that Lee expanded his musical scope with a production of outstanding quality and wide range of featuring artists. He concluded that he smartly overcame the moment when his career could have been stuck in a rut.

Jeong Su-min of IZM also rated it 3.5 out of 5 stars. She wrote that Lee succeeded in expanding his area by bringing together stars and rookies and domestic and foreign artists although there was no adventurous attempt.

Critics of Music Y rated "Yooooo" 3.5 out of 5 stars. Jeong Byeong-uk wrote that there is no fresh flow nor sound.

=== Year-end lists ===
Publication	List	Rank	Ref.
Rhythmer	10 Best Korean Rap Albums of 2022	Honorable mention	

== Awards ==
Award	Year	Category	Result	Ref.
Korean Hip-hop Awards	2023	Hip Hop Album of the Year	Won	

== Track listing ==
All music is composed by GroovyRoom.

No.	Title	Lyrics	Music	Length
1.	"Moshpit Only" (featuring Paul Blanco)	Paul Blanco	Sesame	2:21
2.	"Gotta Lotta Shit" (featuring Dbo, Sokodomo, Kash Bang)	Dbo, Sokodomo, Kash Bang	Sesame, Dbo, Sokodomo, Kash Bang	2:57
3.	"Yooooo" (featuring Kid Milli, Sokodomo, Polodared)	Kid Milli, Sokodomo, Polodared	GooseBumps, Sokodomo	3:03
4.	"A-Team Freestyle" (featuring ASAP Ant, Bill Stax, Strick, Mirani)	ASAP Ant, Bill Stax, Strick, Mirani	ASAP Ant, Bill Staz, Strick, Mirani	3:09
5.	"Slatty Slut" (featuring Sik-K)	Sik-K	Sik-K	2:01
6.	"On the Block" (featuring Coogie, Ourealgoat, Leellmarz)	Coogie, Ourealgoat, Leellamarz		3:08
7.	"Die Hard" (featuring Reddy, Swervy)	Reddy, Swervy, Sui	Sesame, Reddy, Swervy	2:58
8.	"Boss" (featuring Saay, Big Naughty, Goosebumps)	Saay, Big Naughty	GooseBumps, Saay, Big Naughty	3:14
9.	"Back in My Area" (featuring GGM Lil Dragon, Lil Gimchi, Skinny Brown, June One)	GGM Lil Dragon, Lil Gimchi, Skinny Brown, Kim Jun-won	GGM Lil Dragon, Lil Gimchi, Skinny Brown, Kim Jun-won	3:35
Total length:				26:30
