= Racha Thewa =

Racha Thewa ราชาเทวะ
- Subdistrict
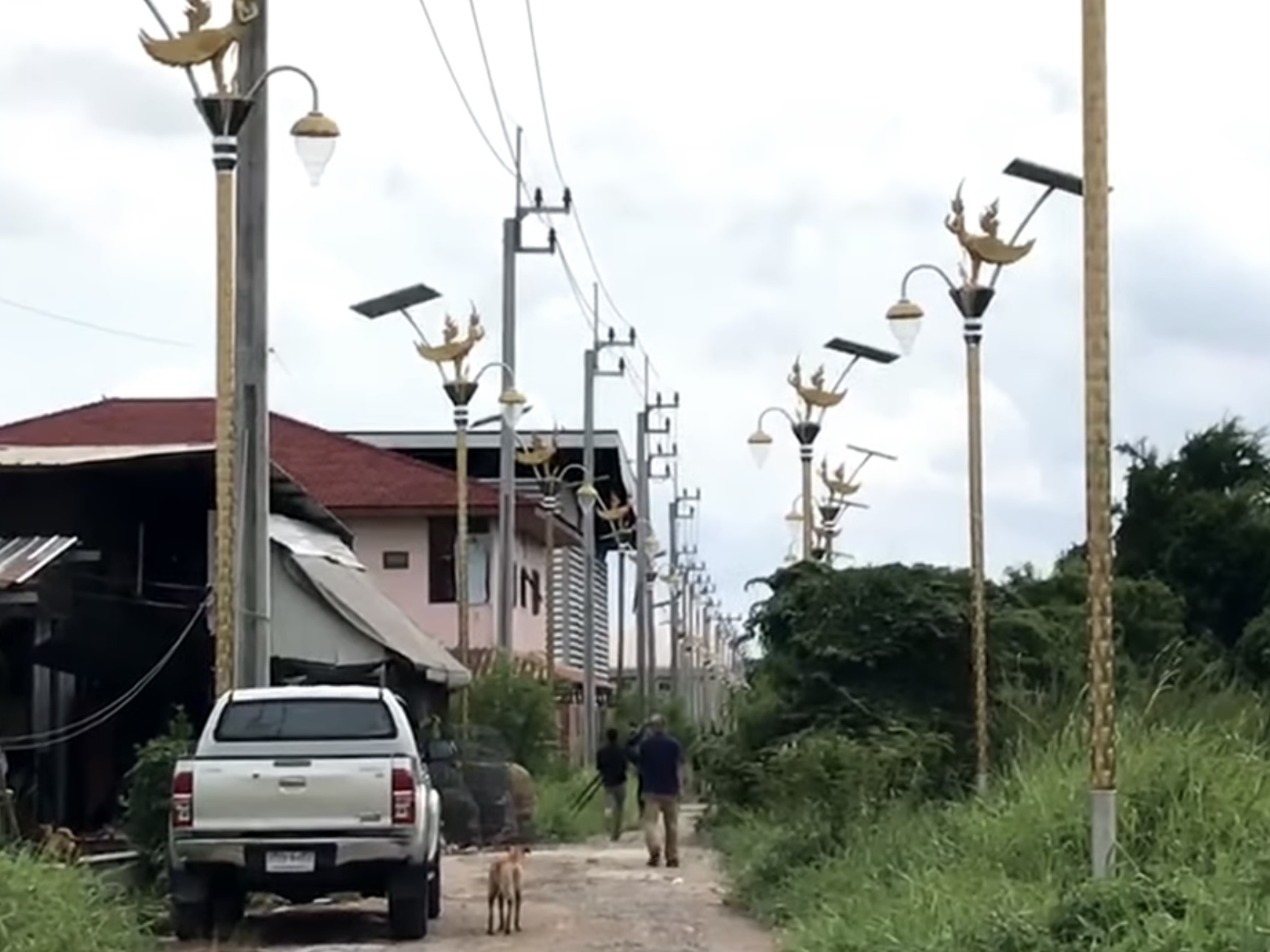
- Kinnari light poles of Racha Thewa
- Interactive map of Racha Thewa
- Country: Thailand
- Province: Samut Prakan
- District: Bang Phli

Population (2005)
  - Total: 21,326
- Postal Code: 10540
- Geocode: 110308

Racha Thewa (Thai: ราชาเทวะ, pronounced [rāː.t͡ɕʰāː tʰēː.wáʔ]) is a commune (tambon) in Bang Phli District, Samut Prakan province, Thailand. It is the site of Suvarnabhumi Airport. The name of the district originates from Saming Racha, a well-known family in the area.

== Administration ==
The tambon is administered by a tambon administrative organization (TAO). It is divided into 15 villages (mubans).

1.	Khlong Lat Krabang	คลองลาดกระบัง
2.	Khlong Lat Krabang	คลองลาดกระบัง
3.	Khlong Lat Krabang	คลองลาดกระบัง
4.	Khlong Nong Bon	คลองหนองบอน
5.	Khlong Lat Krabang	คลองลาดกระบัง
6.	Khlong Lat Krabang	คลองลาดกระบัง
7.	Khlong Lat Krabang	คลองลาดกระบัง
8.	Khlong Bua Kro	คลองบัวเกราะ
9.	Khlong Tha Phuk	คลองตาพุก
10.	Khlong Thewa Trong	คลองเทวะตรง
11.	Khlong Khan Taek	คลองขันแตก
12.	Khlong Chuat Lak Khao	คลองชวดลากข้าว
13.	Wat King Kaeo	วัดกิ่งแก้ว
14.	Khlong Bua Loi	คลองบัวลอย
15.	Khlong Bua Loi	คลองบัวลอย
