= Singapore Airlines Cargo =

Cargo airline based in Singapore

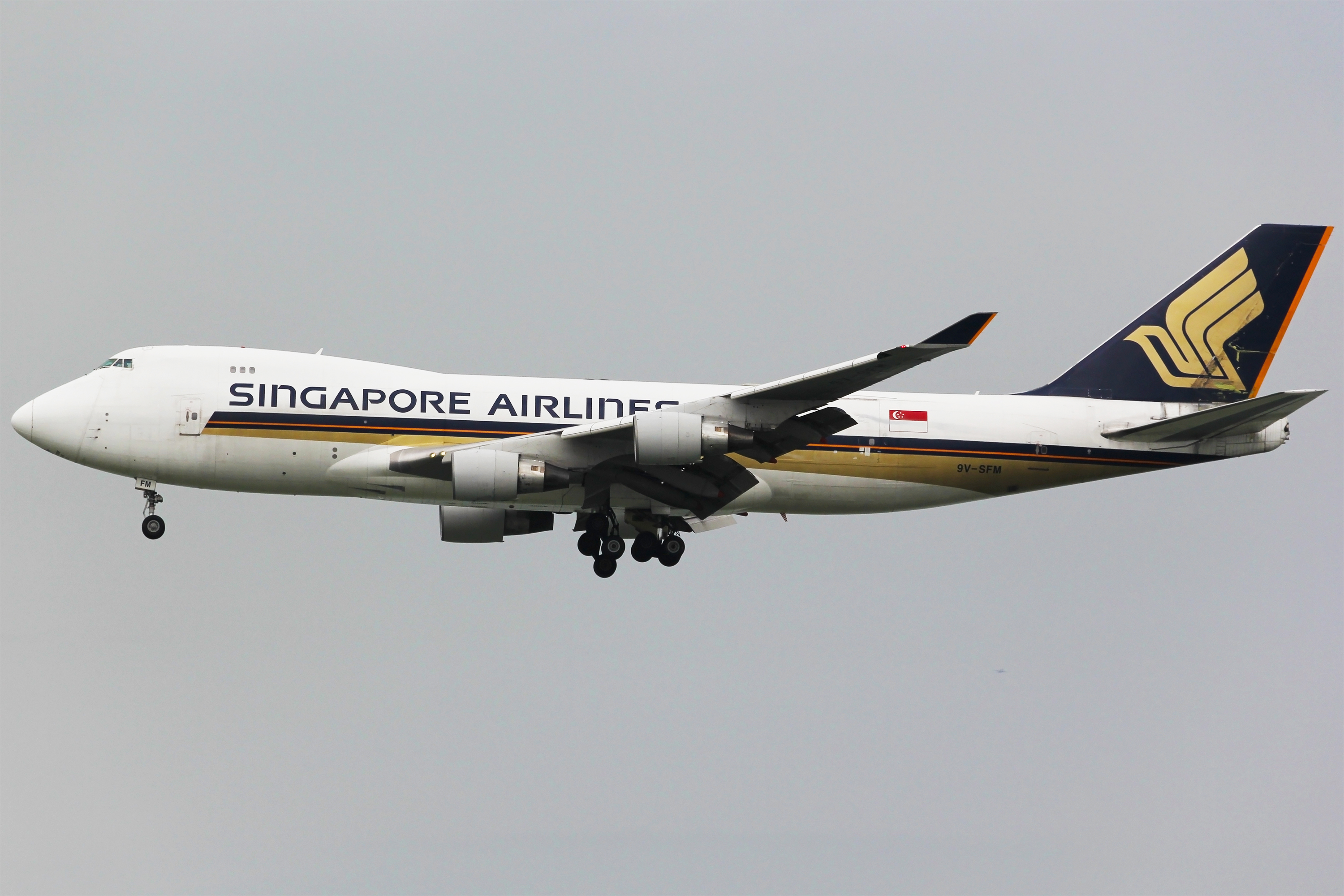
- Singapore Airlines Cargo Boeing 747-400F
IATA	ICAO	Call sign
SQ	SQC	SING CARGO
- Founded: 1988; 38 years ago
- Hubs: Changi Airport
- Fleet size: 12
- Destinations: 19
- Parent company: Singapore Airlines
- Headquarters: Singapore
- Key people: Goh Choon Phong (CEO)
- Revenue: ▲ S$2,220.1 million (FY 2017/18)
- Operating income: ▲ S$148.1 million (FY 2017/18)
- Profit: ▲ S$139.0 million (FY 2017/18)
- Employees: 841 (FY 2017/2018)
- Website: www.siacargo.com

Singapore Airlines Cargo (abbreviation: SIA Cargo) is the unit within Singapore Airlines (SIA) responsible for air cargo operations. It was incorporated in 1988. SIA Cargo manages the cargo operations of SIA's fleet of freight- and passenger aircraft. Its main office is on the fifth floor of the SATS Airfreight Terminal 5 at Singapore Changi Airport.

SIA Cargo was formerly a subsidiary of Singapore Airlines and, for almost two decades, operated as a cargo airline with its own fleet of Boeing 747-400 freighters. In May 2017, Singapore Airlines announced that SIA Cargo would be re-integrated as a division within the SIA group; this was completed in the first half of 2018, after which SIA Cargo became the airline's cargo division.

== History ==
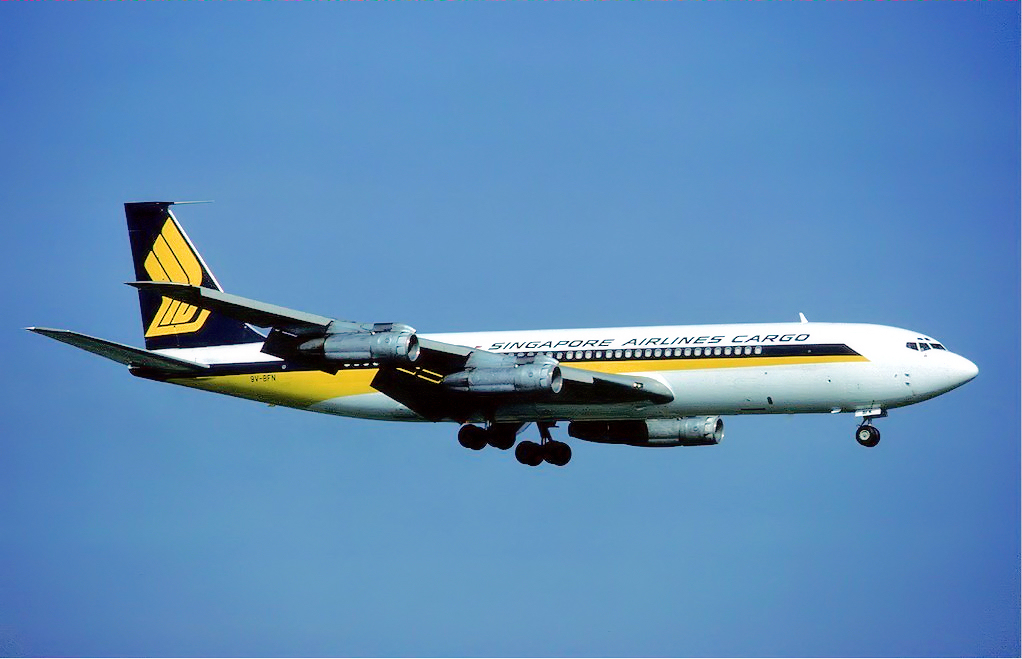
Singapore Airlines Boeing 707-320C freighter, 1979

=== Formation and expansion ===
Singapore Airlines has been in the cargo business for over 50 years. They first started the cargo operations flying the Airspeed Consuls in 1947. In July 1992, Singapore Airlines created a cargo division to complement its passenger-carrying business. However, it was not until 1 July 2001 that Singapore Airlines Cargo was incorporated, taking over the air-freight operations of Singapore Airlines as a separate subsidiary. SIA Cargo leased the entire freighter fleet from Singapore Airlines, as well as taking over management of the cargo holds in all of Singapore Airlines' passenger aircraft. Within a few months, it entered an alliance with Lufthansa Cargo and SAS Cargo Group to form WOW Alliance on 1 October 2001.

SIA Cargo's warehouse in Singapore, dubbed SIA Superhub 1, was opened in 1995. This warehouse is capable of handling up to 450,000 tons of goods a year. In 2001, the SIA Superhub 2 was opened, which increased the capacity to over 1,200,000 tonnes per year.

New routes were introduced in the next few years as the airline began to take advantage of liberalised aviation agreements. A round-the-world service was introduced on 31 October 2001, flying from Singapore to Hong Kong, Dallas, Chicago, Brussels, Sharjah, and back to Singapore on Wednesdays, and on the Singapore-Hong Kong-Dallas-Chicago-Brussels-Mumbai-Singapore route on Fridays. It became the first third-country cargo airline to fly direct between China and the United States on 22 May 2003, when flights commenced from Singapore to Xiamen, Nanjing and onwards to Chicago.

=== Price fixing cases ===
In December 2008, Singapore Airlines Cargo was alleged by the Australian Competition & Consumer Commission (ACCC) to be a participant in a price fixing cartel in the air cargo industry. The ACCC accused Singapore Airlines Cargo of fixing the price of a fuel surcharge and a security surcharge that was applied to air cargo to and from Australia. Singapore Airlines Cargo was the third airline to be the targeted for fuel surcharge price fixing.

In May 2010, Singapore Airlines was fined by the Fair Trade Commission of South Korea for conspiring to introduce fuel surcharges for cargoes or continuing to raise them over the past seven years. Singapore Airlines Cargo released a statement saying that it was "very disappointed" and would "study the decision closely with a serious view towards mounting an appeal" once it received the commission's full reasoning.

In November 2010, the European Commission fined Singapore Airlines Cargo 74.8 million euros for its involvement in a global cartel that included ten other carriers. The Commission found that the carriers—including SIA, Japan Airlines, Qantas, Air Canada, Air France-KLM and British Airways—had fixed fuel and security surcharges for more than six years. Singapore Airlines Cargo said it would likely appeal the ruling.

On 30 November 2010, Singapore Airlines Cargo pleaded guilty to a US$48 million fine imposed by the United States Department of Justice for its role in a conspiracy to fix cargo rates since February 2002, until at least 14 February 2006. Singapore Airlines Cargo's price fixing was in violation of the Sherman Act, which carries a maximum fine for corporations of US$100 million.

In December 2013, Singapore Airlines Cargo agreed to settle over the issue of price fixing in the United States, without admitting to any wrongdoing or liability. Numerous airlines, including SIA Cargo, saw class actions taken against them in 2006 following investigations by various competition authorities on price fixing in air cargo services in the US. SIA Cargo decided to accept an amicable resolution to settle the class action with the payment of US$62.8 million.

=== Recent history ===
On 12 January 2017, Singapore Airlines Cargo was the first airline in the Asia-Pacific region to be awarded the IATA CEIV Pharma Certification, a globally recognised pharmaceutical product handling accreditation.

In May 2017, parent Singapore Airlines announced it would dissolve Singapore Airlines Cargo as a separate company by mid-2018, with freight operations to be reintegrated as a unit within Singapore Airlines.

In 2017, Singapore Airlines Cargo renewed its partnership with Rolls-Royce to transport Trent 1000 aircraft engines from the latter's Seletar Assembly and Test Unit in Singapore to Boeing 787 production facilities in the USA. SIA Cargo also provided charter services to carry state-of-the-art racing equipment for several global sporting events and to transport concert equipment for several high-profile artists.

== Destinations ==
As of 31 March 2018, Singapore Airlines Cargo offered dedicated Boeing 747-400 freighter services to 19 cities in 13 countries and territories, including Singapore.The freighters were transferred to Singapore Airlines as part of the reintegration; and Singapore Airlines Cargo now manages the cargo holds of these and all Singapore Airlines passenger aircraft. The company offers cargo product services to all destinations on the Singapore Airlines network.

Country	City	Airport	Notes
Australia	Adelaide	Adelaide Airport	Terminated
Australia	Melbourne	Melbourne Airport	
Australia	Sydney	Sydney Airport	
Bangladesh	Dhaka	Hazrat Shahjalal International Airport	
Belgium	Brussels	Brussels Airport	Hub
Brazil	Campinas	Viracopos International Airport	Terminated
China	Beijing	Beijing Capital International Airport	
China	Chongqing	Chongqing Jiangbei International Airport	Terminated
China	Nanjing	Nanjing Lukou International Airport	Terminated
China	Shanghai	Shanghai Pudong International Airport	
China	Tianjin	Tianjin Binhai International Airport	Terminated
China	Xiamen	Xiamen Gaoqi International Airport	Terminated
Colombia	Bogotá	El Dorado International Airport	Terminated
Denmark	Copenhagen	Copenhagen Airport	Terminated
Ecuador	Quito	Mariscal Sucre International Airport	Terminated
France	Paris	Charles de Gaulle Airport	
Germany	Frankfurt	Frankfurt Airport	
Germany	Munich	Munich Airport	
Hong Kong	Hong Kong	Hong Kong International Airport	
India	Kolkata	Netaji Subhas Chandra Bose International Airport	Terminated
Ireland	Dublin	Dublin Airport	Terminated
New Zealand	Auckland	Auckland Airport	
Singapore	Singapore	Changi Airport	Hub
United Arab Emirates	Sharjah	Sharjah International Airport	
United Kingdom	Glasgow	Glasgow Prestwick Airport	Terminated
United Kingdom	London	Heathrow Airport	
United Kingdom	Manchester	Manchester Airport	Terminated
United States	Anchorage	Ted Stevens Anchorage International Airport	
United States	Atlanta	Hartsfield–Jackson Atlanta International Airport	Terminated
United States	Chicago	O'Hare International Airport	
United States	Dallas-Fort Worth	Dallas Fort Worth International Airport	
United States	Los Angeles	Los Angeles International Airport	
United States	Seattle	Seattle–Tacoma International Airport	

=== Codeshare agreements ===
Singapore Airlines Cargo had codeshare agreements with the following airlines:

- Nippon Cargo Airlines

== Fleet ==
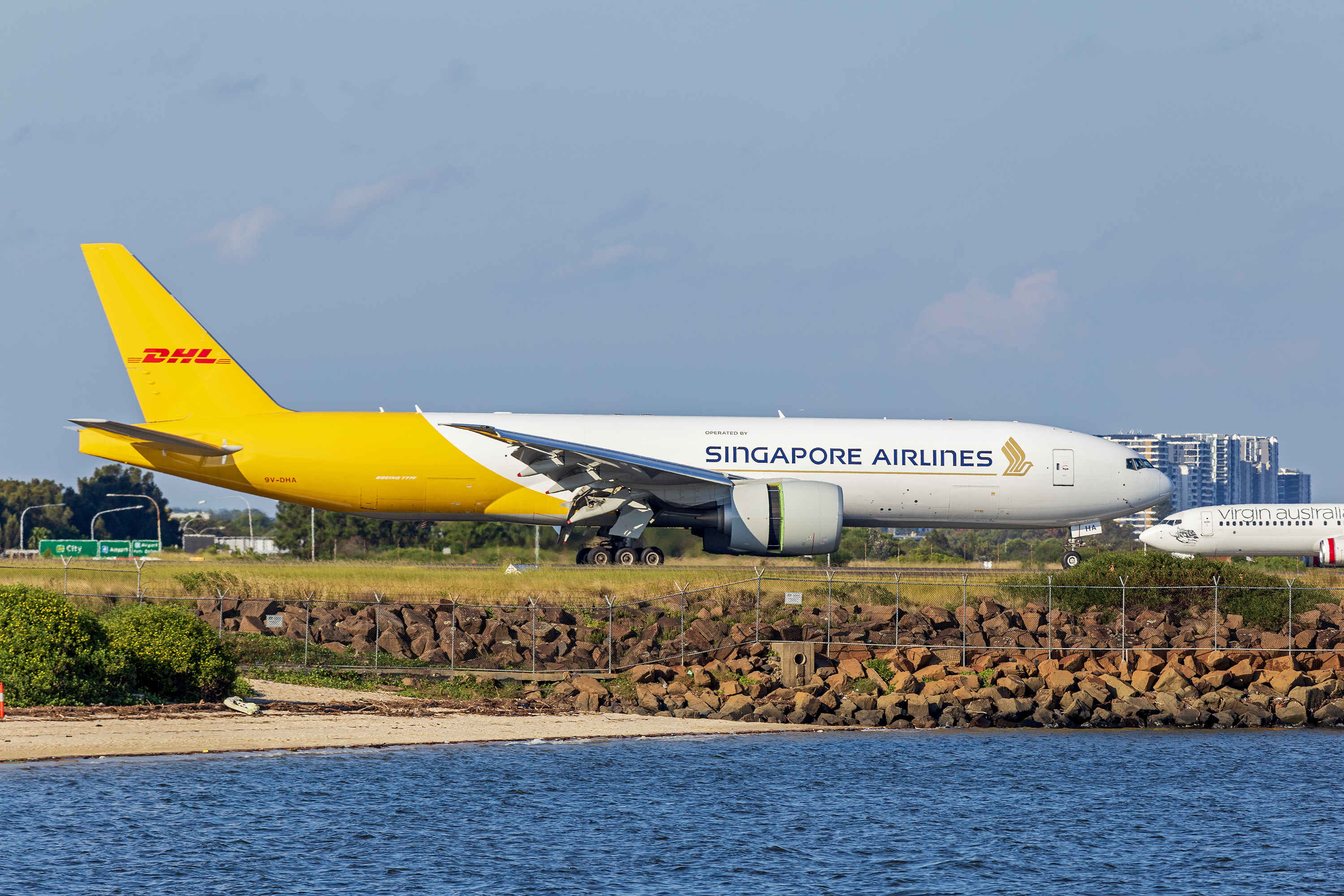
Singapore Airlines-DHL Boeing 777F

As of 5 August 2022, the Singapore Airlines Cargo fleet consisted of the following aircraft:

Singapore Airlines Cargo fleet
Aircraft	In service	Orders	Notes
Airbus A350F	—	7	Expected deliveries to begin in 2027; Order with 5 options Replacing Boeing 747-400F
Boeing 747-400F	7	—	To be retired and replaced by Airbus A350F
Boeing 777F	5	—	Operated for DHL Aviation.
Total	12	7	

=== Fleet development ===
When incorporated in 2001, all nine of Singapore Airlines’ Boeing 747 freighters were transferred to the new cargo start-up at market value and henceforth, all new freighter purchases were to be made from the new company's books.

Due to the Great Recession, in the late 2000s, there was a drop in global demand for freight. As a result, SIA Cargo stored some of its aircraft from January 2009 until February 2015 to reduce capacity. SIA Cargo also phased out its Boeing 747-400BCF ex-passenger aircraft converted to freighters.

==== Airbus A350F ====
On 15 December 2021, Singapore Airlines announced that it had purchased seven Airbus A350F freighters to succeed its seven Boeing 747-400Fs. The order contained options for five more A350Fs and included the swap for existing orders of 15 A320neos and two A350-900s. With the first delivery expected in late 2025, Singapore Airlines would be the launch customer for the A350F.
