= German Cargo =

Cargo airline of Germany (1977–1993)

IATA	ICAO	Call sign
FX	GEC	GERMAN CARGO
- Founded: 10 March 1977
- Commenced operations: May 1977
- Ceased operations: 1 January 1995 merged into Lufthansa Cargo)
- Hubs: Frankfurt Airport
- Parent company: Lufthansa
- Headquarters: Kelsterbach, Hesse, Germany

German Cargo Services GmbH, operating as German Cargo, was an airline from (West) Germany that operated cargo flights on behalf of Lufthansa, of which it was a wholly owned subsidiary.

== History ==
IATA regulations at the time meant Lufthansa could only offer limited cargo services. Therefore, German Cargo was set up as a non-IATA airline in 1977, accommodating Lufthansa's cargo charter operations. Flight services started on 8 May of that year, initially using a Boeing 707, and the airline was based at Frankfurt Airport, Lufthansa's hub.

German Cargo began operating scheduled cargo flights as well, mainly to Eastern Africa and the Middle East. The transport of live animals played an important role in the airline's business portfolio. The interiors of two Douglas DC-8 aircraft were refurbished to accommodate horses. The airline also specialized in the transport of large, damageable goods.

In 1993, Lufthansa reshaped its cargo businesses, splitting German Cargo into two independent, newly founded companies: Lufthansa Cargo for scheduled cargo flights (which inherited German Cargo's ICAO designation), and Lufthansa Cargo Charter for charter and lease services. German Cargo was renamed on 1 May of that year and briefly operated as Lufthansa Cargo Airlines. The German Cargo callsign was later resurrected for Lufthansa's joint venture with DHL, AeroLogic.

== Fleet ==
In its early years, German Cargo operated a fleet of four Boeing 707 aircraft. They were replaced by Douglas DC-8s, which formed the major part of the fleet during most years of the airline's existence. From 1990, the larger Boeing 747 as well as the smaller Boeing 737 were used, that were later transferred to Lufthansa Cargo. In detail, German Cargo operated the following aircraft types (all of which were cargo-configured):

Aircraft type	Introduced	Retired
Boeing 707	1977	1985
Boeing 737-200	1990	1993
Boeing 747-200	1990	1993
Douglas DC-8	1984	1993

During the 1970s and 80s, the aircraft were painted in plain yellow. From 1990, a livery similar to the one used by Lufthansa was used, though with a yellow tail fin featuring the German Cargo logo.

== Gallery ==
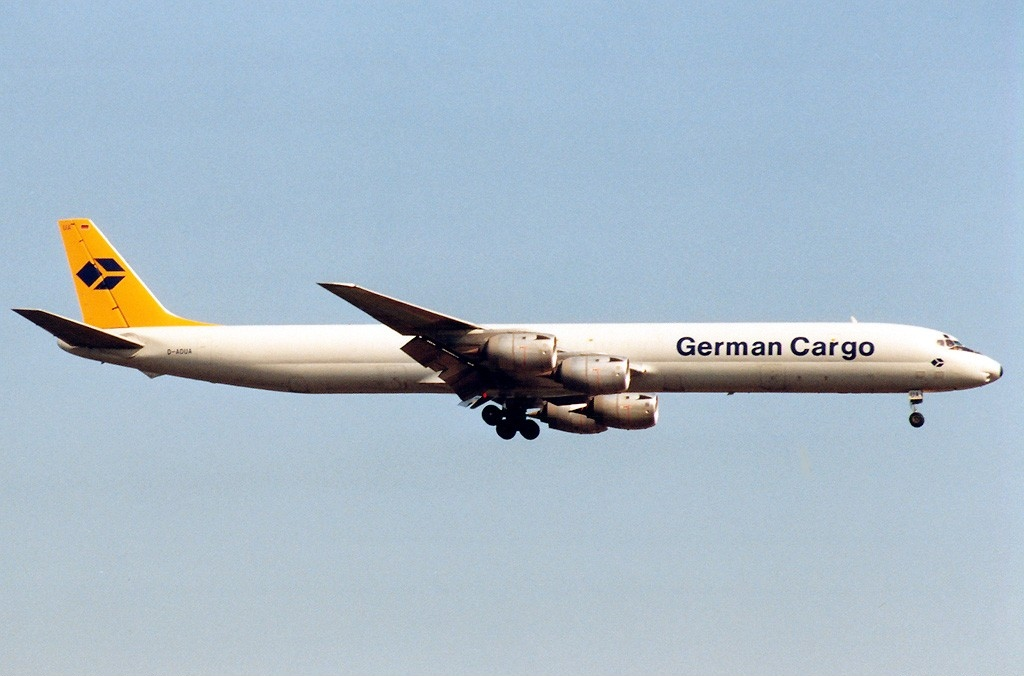
A Douglas DC-8 approaches Frankfurt Airport in 1992.

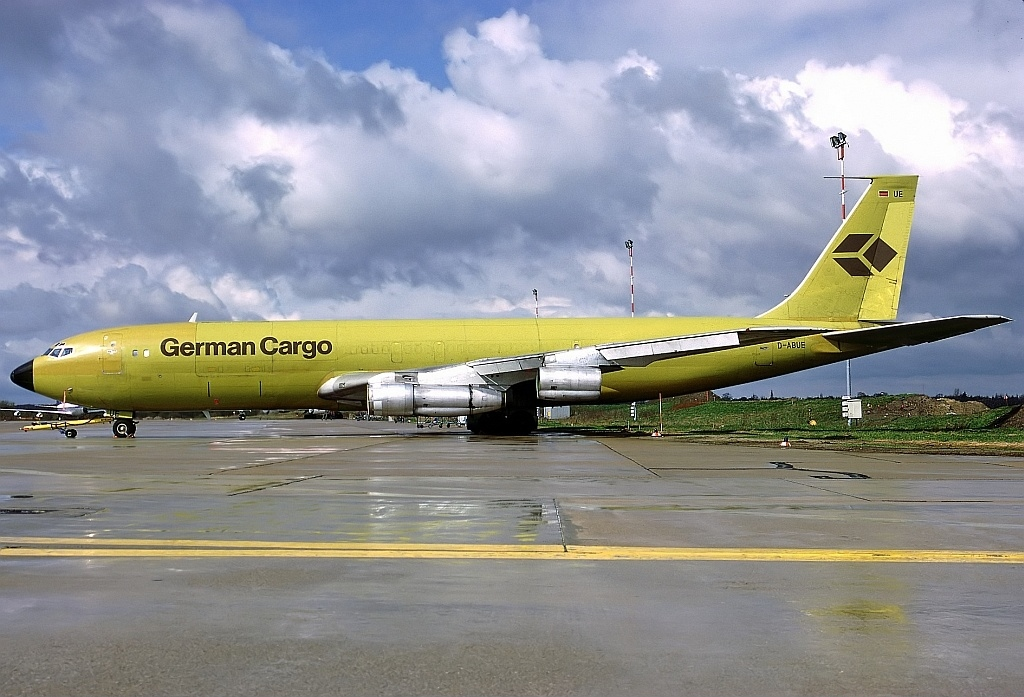
ABoeing 707 at Hamburg Airport in 1985.

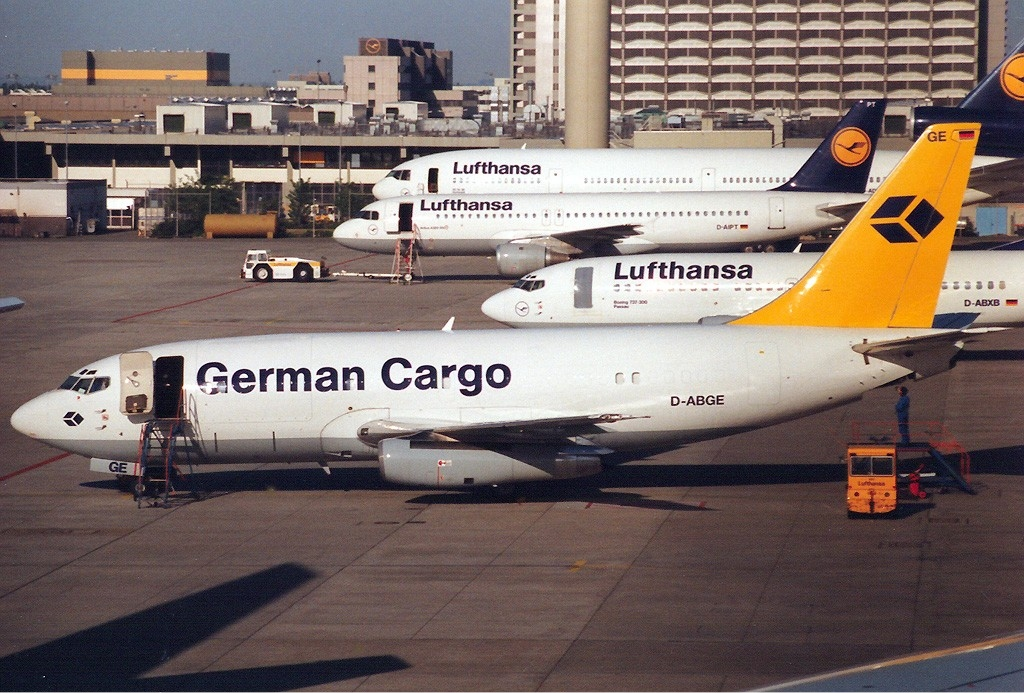
A Boeing 737-200 at Frankfurt Airport in 1991.
