= Hinduja Cargo Services Flight 8533 =

1999 aviation accident

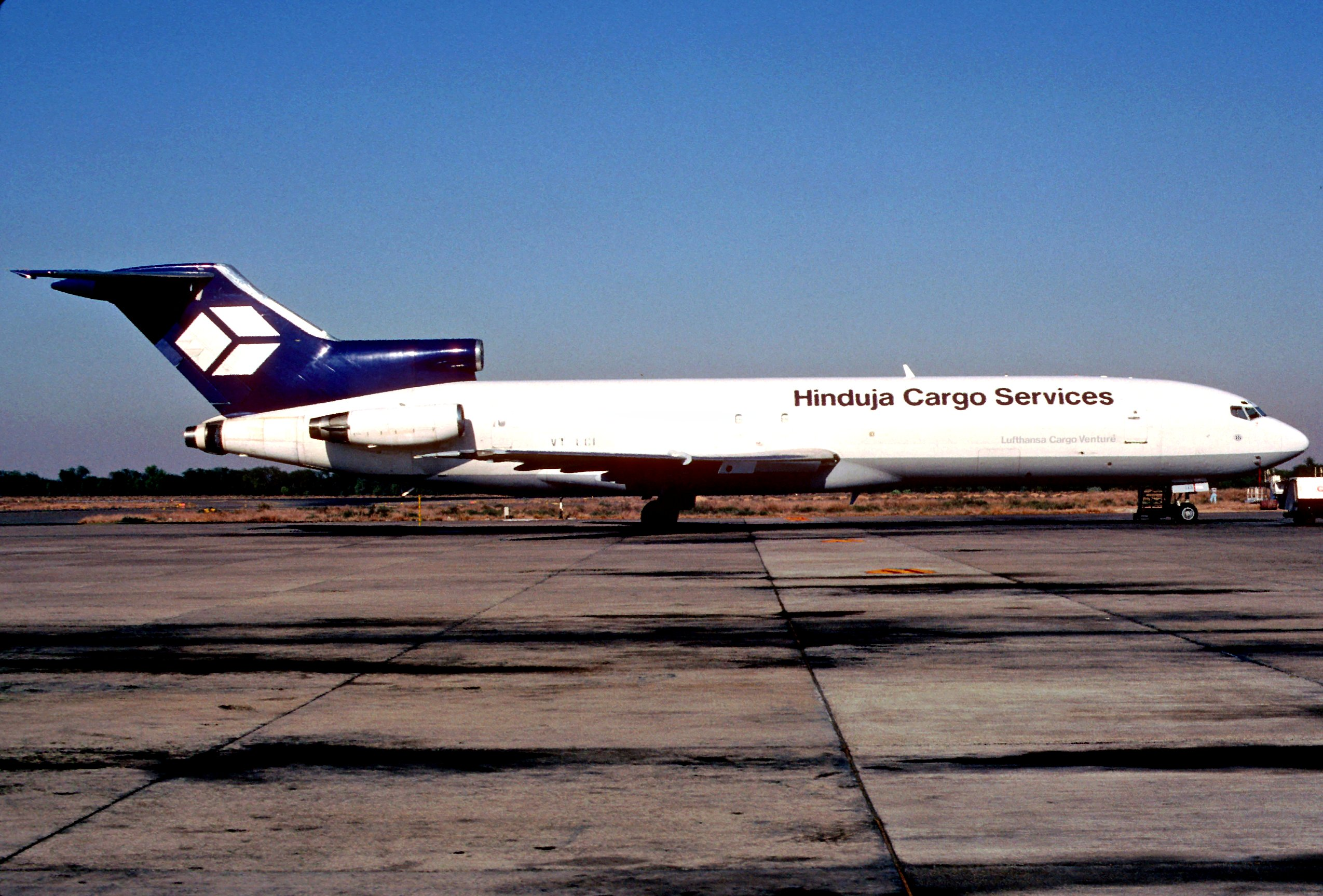
- VT-LCI, the Boeing 727 involved in the accident

Occurrence
- Date: 7 July 1999
- Summary: Controlled flight into terrain due to pilot error and ATC error
- Site: Champadevi Hills, near Kathmandu, Nepal

Aircraft
- Aircraft type: Boeing 727-243F
- Operator: Hinduja Cargo Services on behalf of Lufthansa Cargo
- IATA flight No.: LF8533
- ICAO flight No.: LCI8533
- Call sign: LUFTHANSA INDIA 8533
- Registration: VT-LCI
- Flight origin: Tribhuvan International Airport, Kathmandu, Nepal
- Destination: Indira Gandhi International Airport, New Delhi, India
- Passengers: 0
- Crew: 5
- Fatalities: 5
- Survivors: 0

Hinduja Cargo Services Flight 8533 was a scheduled cargo flight from Tribhuvan International Airport in Nepal to Indira Gandhi International Airport in India operated by Lufthansa Cargo's Indian subsidiary Hinduja Cargo Services. On 7 July 1999, the Boeing 727 operating the flight crashed into the Champadevi Hills at 2,200 metres (7,200 ft) altitude with no survivors amongst the 5 occupants on board.

== Aircraft and crew ==
The aircraft was a 17 year old Boeing 727-200 Freighter plane. It was delivered previously to Alitalia in 1981 as I-DIRS with Continental Airlines too operating the airframe as N586PE and N14416 before delivery to Hinduja Cargo Services as VT-LCI. There were five crew members on board, namely captain Gonzalez, Shahni, Vargava, Singh and Roy. (Note: Full names were not identified as seen in the source mentioned)

== Flight ==
The flight was carrying 21 tons of cargo, mostly textiles and carpets. The flight departed Runway 20 at Kathmandu's Tribhuvan International Airport. After take-off the flight made a 10-degree bank to the right to a heading of 247 at 4.4DME. The power applied on the engines was inadvertently reduced resulting in the aircraft losing height in an area where the altitude of any departing flight must be above 9,500 feet (2,900 m) while VT-LCI was at 7,500 feet (2,300 m). The Ground Proximity Warning System (GPWS) activated with a terrain warning in the cockpit. The speed was reduced to 171 knots (317 km/h; 197 mph) causing the stick shaker to activate. VT-LCI impacted the Champadevi Hills at 7:51 p.m. local time with no survivors.

== See also ==
- List of airplane accidents in Nepal
- Pakistan International Airlines Flight 268
- Thai Airways International Flight 311
- Necon Air Flight 128
- Asiana Airlines Flight 733
- Japan Air Lines Flight 123
