= Hinduja Cargo Services =

Indian airline

IATA	ICAO	Call sign
LF	LCI	LUFTHANSA INDIA
- Founded: April 1996; 30 years ago
- Ceased operations: August 2000; 25 years ago
- Hubs: Indira Gandhi International Airport
- Fleet size: 3
- Parent company: Hinduja Group (60%); Lufthansa Cargo (40%)
- Headquarters: New Delhi, India

Hinduja Cargo Services (legally Lufthansa Cargo India PVT. Limited) was a cargo airline based in New Delhi, India. It was a joint venture between the Hinduja Group and German airline Lufthansa Cargo. The company operated a fleet of Boeing 727 freighters, flying from airports in the Indian subcontinent to feed Lufthansa Cargo's hub in the Middle East.

== History ==
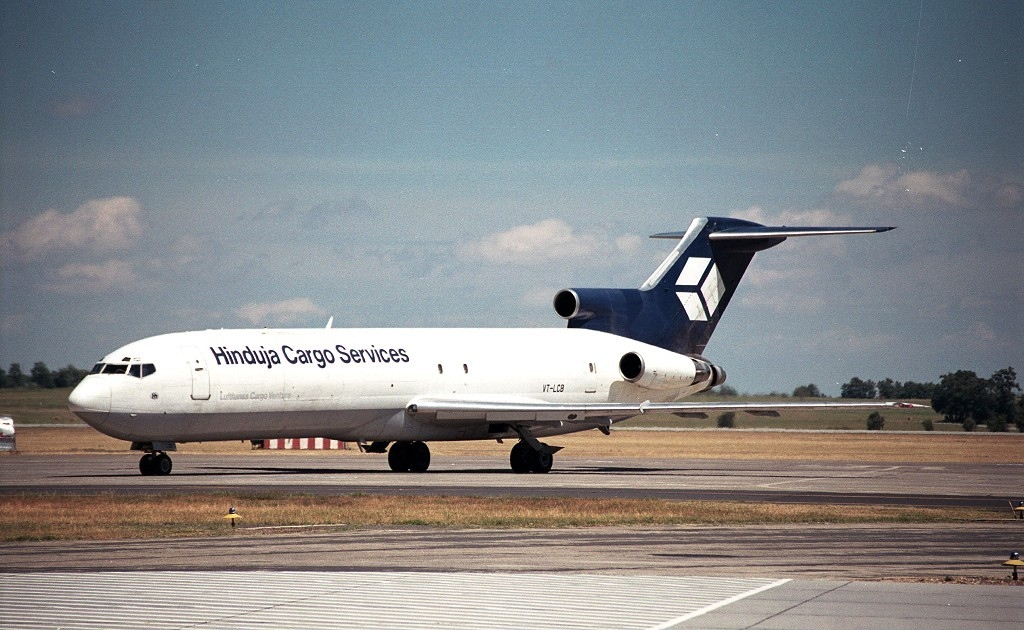
Hinduja Cargo Services Boeing 727-200F

Before 1996, Lufthansa Cargo was operating Douglas DC-8 aircraft between Germany and several Indian cities, including Delhi and Mumbai, as well as a cargo hub at Sharjah in the United Arab Emirates. To increase capacity, Hinduja Cargo Services was formed in April 1996 through a partnership with the Hinduja Group; Hinduja owned a 60% share, with Lufthansa taking the remaining 40%. Two Boeing 727-200F freighters were acquired to replace the DC-8 routes, rising to five aircraft in October 1996.

Lufthansa Cargo suspended its agreement with the Hinduja Group in April 2000, citing higher-than-expected demand which could be better met with direct flights from Frankfurt. The airline was consequently closed by Hinduja in 2001.

== Accident ==
- On 7 July 1999, a Boeing 727-243F operating as Lufthansa Cargo Flight 8533 crashed into a hill after takeoff from Kathmandu, Nepal. All five crew died in the crash.

== See also ==
- List of defunct airlines of India
