= Chew Choon Seng =

Singaporean airline executive

- 周俊成
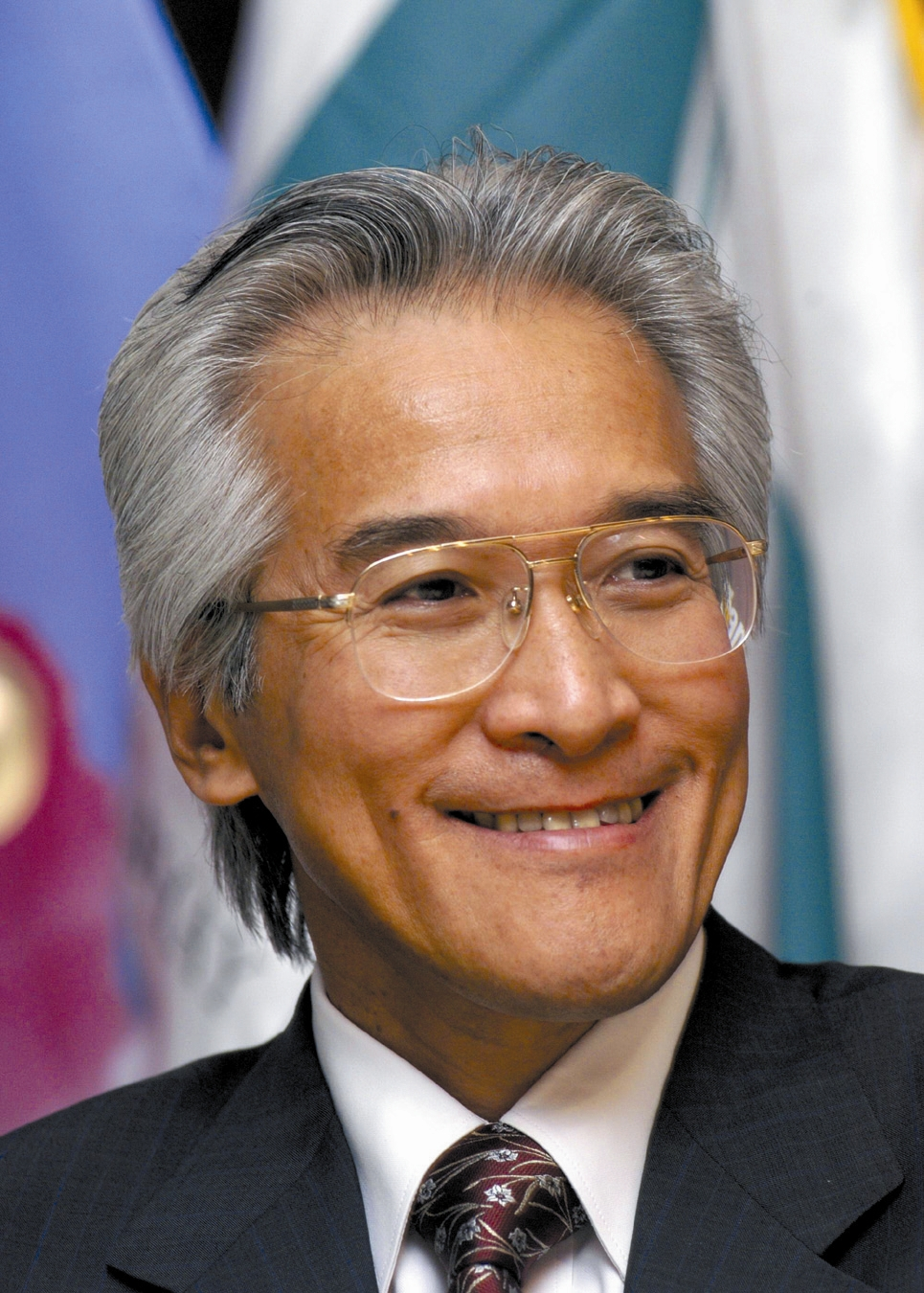
- Chew in 2002
- Born: Singapore
- Citizenship: Singaporean
- Education: University of Singapore Imperial College London
- Occupation: Former CEO of Singapore Airlines
- Successor: Goh Choon Phong

Chew Choon Seng (Chinese: 周俊成; pinyin: Zhōu Jùn Chéng) is the former chief executive officer of Singapore Airlines (SIA), the former chairman of the Singapore Exchange and Singapore Tourism Board.

== Education ==
After completing his degree in mechanical engineering from the University of Singapore, Chew graduated with a Master of Science in operations research and management studies from Imperial College London.

== Career ==
Chew joined SIA in 1972 and held senior assignments for Administration, covering finance, treasury, corporate planning, human resources, legal and corporate affairs in Tokyo, Rome, Sydney, Los Angeles and London. After heading the Planning and Marketing divisions at the airline's corporate headquarters, he was appointed CEO in June 2003.

Chew also served as the chairman of the Singapore Aircraft Leasing Enterprise and was the directors of various SIA subsidiaries including Singapore Airport Terminal Services, SIA Engineering Company, and Virgin Atlantic, in which SIA previously held a 49 per cent equity stake. He was the chairman of SilkAir, a fully owned subsidiary of SIA when SilkAir Flight 185 crashed on 19 December 1997 en route from Jakarta's Soekarno–Hatta International Airport to Singapore Changi Airport.

Chew relinquished his position as chief executive officer (CEO) of Singapore Airlines (SIA) at the end of 2010 and assuming the post of Chairman at Singapore Exchange (SGX) and Singapore Tourism Board (STB) and board member of Government of Singapore Investment Corporation.

Chew was named the Leading Singapore CEO in the fifth Annual Thomson Reuters Extel Asia Pacific Survey in 2011.

On 22 September 2016, Chew retired from the board of SGX.
