= Goh Choon Phong =

Singaporean businessman

- 吴俊鹏
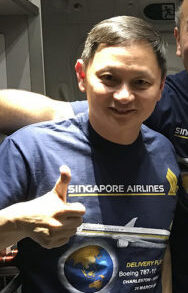
- Goh in 2018
- Born: July 1963 (age 63); State of Singapore (now Republic of Singapore)
- Education: Hwa Chong Junior College; Massachusetts Institute of Technology
- Occupations: CEO of Singapore Airlines; CEO of Singapore Airlines Cargo; Chairman of Scoot

Goh Choon Phong (simplified Chinese: 吴俊鹏; traditional Chinese: 吳俊鵬; pinyin: Wú Jùnpéng) is a Singaporean businessman who is the chief executive officer (CEO) of Singapore Airlines and Singapore Airlines Cargo. He was formally appointed to be the CEO on 1 January 2011 in an announcement dated 3 September 2010. Prior to his appointment, he worked for the SIA group for more than 20 years for the airlines' operations in China and Scandinavia.

== Early life and education ==
Goh was born in July 1963 in Singapore. He graduated from Hwa Chong Junior College, and is an alumnus of the Massachusetts Institute of Technology's Electrical Engineering and Computer Science Department, majoring in computer science, management science and cognitive science. He also holds Master of Science in Electrical Engineering and Computer Science.

== Career ==
Goh joined Singapore Airlines after finishing his Masters degree at Massachusetts Institute of Technology as a cadet administrative officer, fulfilling the sponsorship Singapore Airlines offered to him to pursue his studies at MIT.

Subsequently, Goh rose up the ranks, taking on appointments such as Senior Vice President of Commercial Technology, Senior Vice President of Information Technology, Executive Vice President of Marketing and Chairman of SilkAir, a former subsidiary of Singapore Airlines which has since merged with Singapore Airlines. He was appointed as CEO of Singapore Airlines on 1 January 2011, replacing outgoing CEO Chew Choon Seng who was retiring.

As CEO, Goh led the airline group in its expansion phase after the 2008 financial crisis and the recovery from the COVID-19 pandemic, which brought the aviation industry to a halt in the early 2020s. Notably, the group recovered strongly post-pandemic, and achieved a record annual profit of S$2.68 billion in fiscal year 2023-2024. Also under his leadership, he headed the consolidation of Singapore Airlines Group's business, merging its two wholly owned budget carriers Tigerair and Scoot into a single entity Scoot, and the merger of SilkAir, a wholly owned full service carrier subsidiary, into the main carrier Singapore Airlines. He also oversaw Singapore Airline's joint venture with Tata Group to form a new Indian full service carrier, Vistara, and the subsequent merger of Vistara with Air India, in which Singapore Airlines obtained a 25.1% stake in the newly rebranded airline.

Goh also looked after Singapore Airlines' response to the SQ321 incident, where severe turbulence over the Irrawaddy Basin hit the Singapore Airlines B777-300ER plane enroute from London Heathrow Airport to Singapore Changi Airport, resulting in a fatality and leaving many severely injured.

In recognition of his efforts, Goh was awarded with accolades such as the 2015 Centre for Aviation’s Asia-Pacific Airline CEO of the Year award, 2016 Eisenhower Global Innovation Award from the Business Council for International Understanding, 2017 Outstanding Chief Executive Officer in the Business Time's Singapore Business Awards, 2019 Singapore Corporate Award's Best Chief Executive Officer for companies with $1 billion or more in market capitalization, and Tatler's Asia Most Influential 2022 & 2023. Most recently in 2024, Goh was awarded the 2024 Excellence in Leadership Award at the Air Transport World (ATW) magazine’s annual Airline Industry Achievement Awards.

He also oversaw Singapore Airlines' joint venture with Tata Group to form the Indian full-service carrier Vistara, and the subsequent merger of Vistara with Air India, completed in November 2024, after which Singapore Airlines became a 25.1% shareholder in the enlarged Air India group. The investment later attracted renewed scrutiny after Air India recorded heavy losses and sought further shareholder support. In April 2026, The Straits Times, citing Bloomberg, reported that Air India had incurred a larger-than-expected annual loss of more than 220 billion rupees, or about S$3 billion, and was in talks with Tata Group and Singapore Airlines for a cash injection. The report also noted that the possible funding might be insufficient, requiring Air India to seek other financing options, and that Singapore Airlines' own earnings had been dragged down by Air India's worsening performance. A CNA commentary by aviation and financial journalist Ven Sreenivasan cited concerns that additional funding could reduce dividend capacity, divert capital from Singapore Airlines' own fleet and digital investments, and risk "throwing good money after bad" unless accompanied by stronger oversight, performance conditions and clearer recovery or exit timelines.

Under Goh's leadership, Singapore Airlines also announced a S$1.1 billion programme in November 2024 to install new long-haul cabin products across 41 Airbus A350-900 long-haul and ultra-long-range aircraft, with the first retrofitted A350-900 long-haul aircraft originally expected to enter service in the second quarter of 2026. In May 2026, the airline delayed the entry into service of its next-generation A350 first- and business-class seats to the first quarter of 2027, citing industry-wide supply-chain constraints and a delay in the certification of one of the new seats.

The delay drew criticism from aviation commentators and frequent flyers over the competitiveness of Singapore Airlines' long-haul premium cabin products. Aviation website Mainly Miles described the new seats as "long-awaited" and "already long-delayed", noting that they had originally been expected to debut on Boeing 777-9 aircraft in 2021 before repeated delays to that aircraft programme led Singapore Airlines to use the Airbus A350 retrofit as the launch platform instead. The site said the 2027 timeline would make the new product Singapore Airlines' first major long-haul business-class redesign in nearly 14 years, as its principal long-haul business-class seat was introduced in 2013 and its 2017 Airbus A380 seat had limited network coverage.

Commentary on the delay also contrasted Singapore Airlines' timeline with competitors that had already introduced or were rolling out more recent premium cabin products, including Qatar Airways' Qsuite, introduced in 2017; British Airways' Club Suite, first rolled out in 2019; Emirates' continuing A350 and Boeing 777 cabin rollout; and Qantas' Project Sunrise A350 first- and business-class suites. Some online passenger reaction similarly criticised the continued use of Singapore Airlines' 2013 business-class seat on long-haul routes as outdated in the mid-2020s, while other users attributed the delay to supplier constraints, the COVID-19 period and Boeing 777-9 delays.

Singapore Airlines finally launched its long awaited next generation of cabin products in November 2026, 9 years after its last major cabin launch in November 2017. Its next generation of cabin products featured its remodeled first and business class suites, with refurbishments to its long-haul aircraft expected to cost over S$2 billion (approximately $1.6 billion USD). However, consensus among the aviation community is that Goh and Singapore Airlines "botched business class finishes," with some calling it the "Ugliest Seat" while comparing its product to Scoot and Spirit Airlines.

Goh is currently also a member of the National University of Singapore's Board of Trustees, and an independent director of Mastercard.
