= WOW Alliance =

Global cargo alliance

- Launch date: 2000
- Full members: 4

WOW Alliance was a cargo airline alliance consisting of up to four airlines.

== History ==
The WOW Alliance was established in 2000 by the SAS Cargo Group, Lufthansa Cargo and Singapore Airlines Cargo while JAL Cargo joined in July 2002. Due to disagreements within the group, Lufthansa Cargo subsequently left the WOW Alliance in 2009 while JAL Cargo ended its operations after more than 30 years of service in 2010 and left as well.

The WOW Alliance ceased operations sometime after 2010 without any announcement. However, Singapore Airlines confirmed in 2023 that the alliance no longer exists. Its sole competitor had been the similar SkyTeam Cargo.

== Members ==
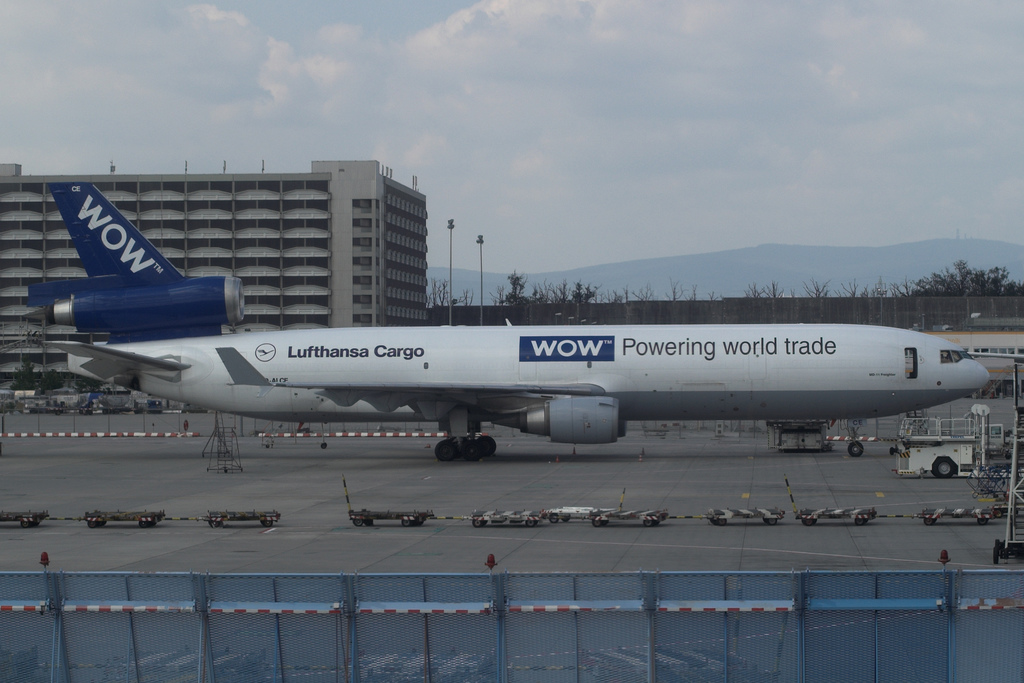
A Lufthansa Cargo McDonnell Douglas MD-11F wearing special WOW Alliance titles in 2007.

The following cargo airlines were members of the WOW Alliance:

| Member airline | Country | Joined | Exited | Division airline |
|---|---|---|---|---|
| SAS Cargo Group | Denmark; Norway; Sweden | 2000 | unknown | Scandinavian Airlines |
| Singapore Airlines Cargo | Singapore | 2000 | unknown | Singapore Airlines |
| Lufthansa Cargo | Germany | 2000 | 2009 | Lufthansa |
| JAL Cargo | Japan | 2002 | 2010 | Japan Airlines |
