= Time:matters =

German logistics company

time:matters
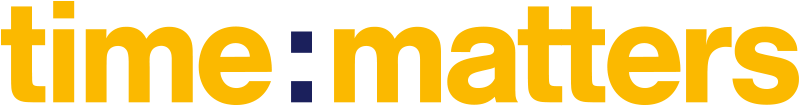
- Company type: Limited liability company (LLC)
- Industry: Logistics
- Founded: January 1, 2002
- Headquarters: Neu-Isenburg, Germany
- Key people: Lars Krosch, COO
- Owner: Lufthansa Cargo
- Number of employees: >330
- Website: www.time-matters.com

time:matters is a German logistics company specializing in urgent transports and time-critical international shipping. The company, founded on January 1, 2002, is owned by Lufthansa Cargo. The company benefits from exclusive cooperation agreements, providing access to the Lufthansa Group network, Intercity-Express high-speed railway services of Deutsche Bahn, as well as collaborations with Frankfurt International Airport and Munich Airport. Additionally, time:matters operates its own courier terminals. Its services cater to various industries, including Life and Health, Medical Technology, Aviation and Aerospace, Machinery and Components, Automotive, and High Tech and Semiconductors.

== History ==
time:matters was established in 2002 as a spin-off from Lufthansa Cargo AG under the name "Lufthansa Cargo Same Day World GmbH". The company later rebranded to "time:matters GmbH" in 2003, focusing on "Special Speed Solutions" and time-critical shipments via air, rail, and road. In 2004, time:matters partnered with United Airlines Cargo for intercontinental shipments to the United States.

In 2007, Aheim Capital GmbH acquired a majority stake, with Lufthansa Cargo retaining 49%. Subsequently, "time:matters Spare Parts Logistics GmbH" was established to supply customers with required spare parts. The same year saw the opening of the Courier Terminal at Frankfurt Airport. In 2010, the ic:kurier service expanded to Vienna, Paris, and France.

In 2016, Lufthansa Cargo became the sole stakeholder by acquiring 51% from Aheim Capital GmbH. Subsequently, in 2017, the company launched its digital On Board Courier platform, airmates.

In 2018, time:matters expanded its same-day Air network to the US and Mexico. The company also obtained ISO 14001:2015 environmental certification and acquired CB Customs Broker GmbH and Customs Broker Cargo Handling GmbH, enhancing its customs clearance services.

In 2019, time:matters expanded its same-day Air network to Asia and received ISO 9001:2015 and AEO certifications. The company also began offsetting CO_{2} emissions for all airmates Onboard Courier transports.

In 2020, time:matters expanded its presence in the US, establishing a corporate affiliate and a domestic same-day Air network with 100 stations.

The time:matters headquarters is located at Gutenberg Street 6, Neu-Isenburg, Germany, and the company employs over 330 people.

== Subsidiaries ==
- time:matters Courier Terminals GmbH
- time:matters Austria GmbH
- time:matters Netherlands B.V.
- time:matters Asia Pacific Pte Ltd.
- time:matters Shanghai International Freight Forwarding Ltd.
- time:matters Americas, Inc.
