= Singapore Airlines Flight 321 =

2024 aviation accident over Myanmar

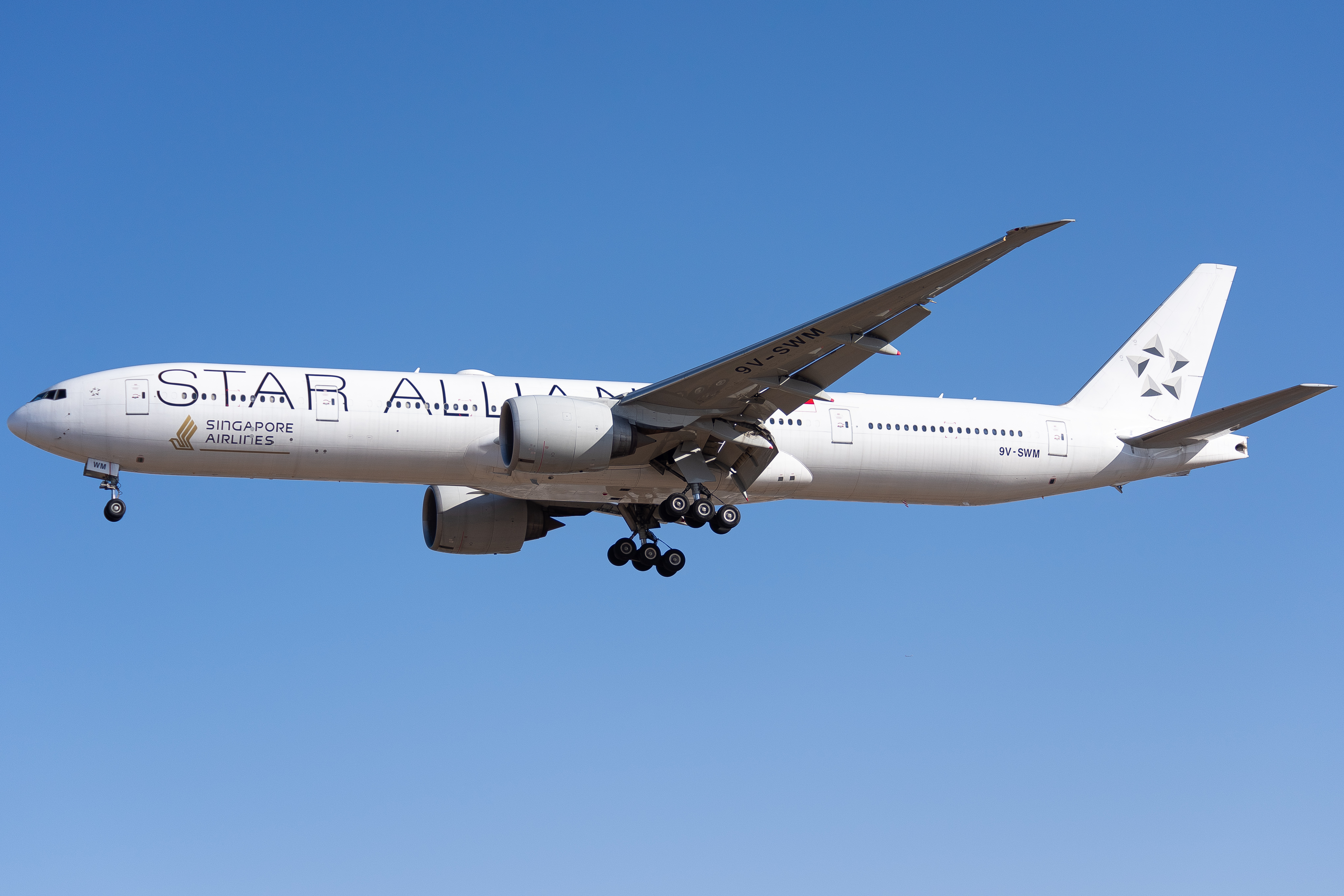
- 9V-SWM, the aircraft involved in the accident, seen in 2021

Accident
- Date: 21 May 2024
- Summary: Severe in-flight turbulence caused by convective clouds and thunderstorms.
- Site: over the Irrawaddy River, Myanmar; 16°31′00″N 95°08′56″E

Aircraft
- Aircraft type: Boeing 777-312ER (Note: The aircraft involved was a Boeing 777-300ER. Boeing assigned a customer code for companies that buy one of its aircraft, which is applied as a suffix to the model number at the time the aircraft is built, hence "777-312ER" designates a 777-300ER built for Singapore Airlines (customer code 12).)
- Operator: Singapore Airlines
- IATA flight No.: SQ321
- ICAO flight No.: SIA321
- Call sign: SINGAPORE 321
- Registration: 9V-SWM
- Flight origin: Heathrow Airport, London, England
- Destination: Changi Airport, Changi, Singapore
- Occupants: 229
- Passengers: 211
- Crew: 18
- Fatalities: 1
- Injuries: 79
- Survivors: 228

Singapore Airlines Flight 321 was a scheduled international passenger flight operating from London Heathrow Airport in London, England, to Changi Airport in Changi, Singapore. On 21 May 2024, the Boeing 777 operating the flight, carrying 211 passengers and 18 crew members, encountered severe turbulence over the Irrawaddy River, Myanmar, resulting in the death of a passenger and leaving 79 crew and passengers injured. The aircraft was diverted to Suvarnabhumi Airport in Bangkok, Thailand.

== Background ==
=== Aircraft ===
The aircraft involved was a 16-year-old Boeing 777-312ER, registered as 9V-SWM, with manufacturer serial number 34578 and line number 701. It was equipped with two General Electric GE90-115B engines and was delivered to Singapore Airlines in February 2008. It was one of two Singapore Airlines Boeing 777-300ERs to be temporarily converted into freighters in 2020, as the airline had tapped into freight as an alternative revenue stream amid depressed passenger demand during the COVID-19 pandemic.

=== Crew ===
The crew consisted of two captains, one serving as the pilot in command and another as an augmenting pilot, and a senior first officer. The 60-year-old pilot in command had 21,922 hours of flight time, including 6,816 hours on the Boeing 777. The 51-year-old augmenting pilot had 13,791 flying hours, including 1,226 hours on the 777. The 40-year-old first officer had flown for 6,230 hours, including 1,146 hours on the 777.

== Accident ==
The route map of the flight

On 20 May 2024, Singapore Airlines Flight 321 took off from London Heathrow Airport at 21:38 (22:38 British Summer Time) enroute to Singapore Changi Airport and the flight was initially uneventful. The flight was three hours away from landing in Singapore when at an altitude of 37,000 feet (11,000 m), from 07:49:21 to 07:50:05, the aircraft encountered severe turbulence over the Irrawaddy River. Cabin crew members were in the midst of serving breakfast when the turbulence became sufficiently severe for unsecured passengers and objects to become airborne inside the cabin. Tracking data showed that the aircraft was at an altitude of 37,000 feet (11,278 m) at the time of the encounter.

Preliminary investigations suggested the flight experienced rapid vertical force changes and an altitude drop of around 177 ft (54 m) The flight was then diverted to Bangkok, where it made an emergency landing at 15:45 Thailand Standard Time (08:45 UTC). Singapore Airlines dispatched a relief flight which carried 131 passengers and 12 crew members to Singapore the next morning.

=== Casualties ===
One passenger died and 79 others were injured, with 20 of them in intensive care. The sole fatality was a 73-year-old British man travelling with his wife, who was hospitalised. The man had a prior heart condition, and died suffering from a heart failure and lung edema. It was the first turbulence-related death in civil aviation in 25 years. At least five medical personnel—a doctor, a nurse and three first aid workers—were passengers and tended to the injured despite sustaining injuries themselves from the turbulence. Fifteen Britons, twelve Australians, nine Malaysians, five Filipinos, four New Zealanders, two Singaporeans, one Myanmar and one Hong Konger were also injured. The oldest person to receive treatment was 83 years old. Most victims were treated for fractures including to the vertebrae and skull, as well as internal damage to the brain, spinal cord and other organs. Some passengers said the "fasten seat belt" sign was turned on too late to prevent injuries. Images show that the oxygen masks were hanging after parts of the aircraft's interior were damaged.

== Investigation ==
The investigation was held by the Transport Safety Investigation Bureau (TSIB), a department within the Ministry of Transport of Singapore, who had been delegated investigation duties by the Myanmar Transport Safety Branch. Data from both the flight data recorder (FDR) and cockpit voice recorder (CVR) were subsequently obtained by TSIB investigators, who arrived in Bangkok on the night of the accident.

The US National Transportation Safety Board was also reported to be sending an accredited representative and four technical advisers to support the investigation process as the accident involved an American-built aircraft.

=== Preliminary report ===
Preliminary investigations released by TSIB on 29 May 2024 are based on preliminary analysis of the FDR and CVR. These revealed that the turbulence was first encountered at 07:49:21 UTC, the aircraft experienced positive vertical forces fluctuating between 0.44G and 1.57G for about 19 seconds, with an uncommanded increase of aircraft altitude to 37,362 feet (11,388 m). The turbulence caused the plane to vibrate. The autopilot, being engaged, pitched the plane downwards to return to 37,000 feet (11,278 m). There was also an uncommanded increase in airspeed, which the pilots extended the speed brakes to counteract for. At 07:49:32 UTC, one of the pilots called out that the fasten seatbelt signs had been turned on. At 07:49:40 UTC the aircraft experienced a drop in vertical acceleration from +1.35G to −1.5G within 0.6 seconds, which likely caused unrestrained passengers to become airborne. At 07:49:41 UTC the vertical acceleration changed from −1.5G to +1.5G in 4 seconds, which would have caused airborne occupants to fall.

Through this 4.6 second sequence, the aircraft was recorded as dropping from 37,362 feet (11,388 m) to 37,184 feet (11,334 m), a fall of 178 feet (54.3 m). The pilots manually controlled the aircraft for 21 seconds to stabilise the aircraft and re-engaged the autopilot at 07:50:05 UTC. The aircraft returned to its selected altitude of 37,000 feet at 07:50:23 UTC. The uncommanded increase in airspeed and altitude was likely due to an updraft. No further severe turbulence was encountered for the remaining flight to Bangkok. Flight International noted that "The latest interim reports suggest that the captain should have taken account of the fact that there was extensive convective activity close to the aircraft’s flightpath, and should have ordered crew and passengers to be strapped in rather than allowing a meal service to proceed."

=== Final report ===
The final report for the accident was released by TSIB on 18 May 2026. The report concluded that the aircraft had experienced severe turbulence caused by convective clouds and thunderstorms, resulting in air movements into a storm, strong updrafts, downdrafts and outflow winds. The report noted groups of convective clouds that had rapidly risen in height within 10 minutes before the accident occurred, and cited Singapore Airlines' analysis that the updraft at the accident site had an estimated wind speed of 8000–9000 feet (2400–2700 metres) per minute. During the turbulence, the aircraft experienced large changes in G-forces between -1.5G and +1.76G. The pilots had turned on the "fasten seat belt" sign but had insufficient time to make an announcement over the public address system, resulting in some passengers unable to fasten their seat belts in time and leading to a large number of injuries. Investigators also concluded that the weather radar may not have detected or under-detected the weather conditions over Myanmar during the flight, causing the pilots to be unaware of imminent weather, and noted that under-detection also occurred during the aircraft's ferry flight from Bangkok to Singapore. Investigators observed tests conducted by the weather radar manufacturer who concluded there was no evidence of failure but had observed irregularities during the test.

TSIB issued four recommendations. The first two recommendations were directed at Boeing and recommended the creation of guidelines for pilots and maintenance workers to determine to identify and respond to cases of the weather radar not detecting or under-detecting imminent weather. The third recommendation advised the weather radar manufacturer to devise a way to record weather display images to help resolve faults. The fourth recommendation, directed at the International Civil Aviation Organization, calls for aircraft with a maximum takeoff weight of above 27,000 kilograms (60,000 lb) built before 2023 to be installed with systems that record information shown to pilots on their flight displays.

== Aftermath ==
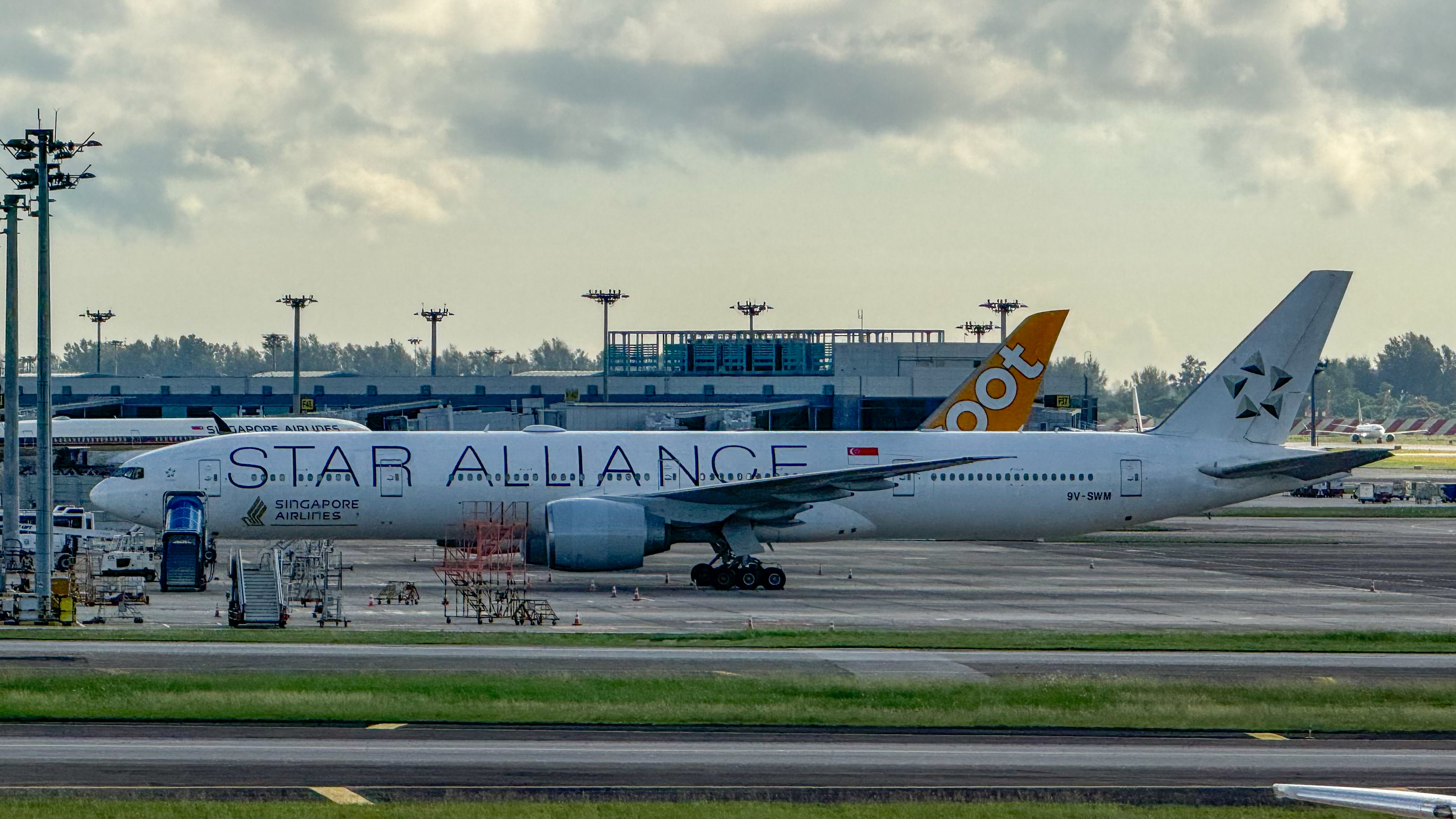
9V-SWM parked at Singapore Changi Airport, on 5 June 2024, in the aftermath of the accident.

After the accident, Singapore Airlines announced it would modify its cabin service routines. In addition to the suspension of hot beverage service when the seat belt sign was on, the meal service would also be suspended. The current policy of crew members securing all loose items and equipment in the cabin during poor weather conditions would continue. The airline offered compensation payments of $10,000 US dollars to victims with minor injuries and an "advance payment" of $25,000 US dollars for those seriously injured as well as further discussions to meet "their specific circumstances". It also offered a full fare refund and $1,000 Singapore dollars to all passengers on board to cover immediate expenses and arrangements for relatives to fly to Bangkok where requested.

On 22 May 2024, the CEO of Singapore Airlines Goh Choon Phong apologised for what happened on Flight SQ321 and expressed condolences while pledging full cooperation with the ongoing investigation. Condolences were also issued by Singaporean Prime Minister Lawrence Wong and President Tharman Shanmugaratnam.

The accident aircraft was subsequently cleared to continue flying, and returned to Singapore on 26 May. It subsequently completed a functional flight check on 23 July in preparation for a return to service. On 27 July, the aircraft returned to service and resumed operations, flying from Singapore to Shanghai as SQ830. A Singapore Airlines spokesperson stated that the aircraft also "met the safety requirements set by the aircraft manufacturer, passed stringent safety checks by SIA’s engineering and flight operations teams, and successfully completed a functional check flight before its return to service."

=== Legal cases ===
As of August 2026, eight people, including the widow of the passenger who died, have sued Singapore Airlines for damages in United Kingdom.

== See also ==
- China Eastern Airlines Flight 583, an in-flight upset that occurred on 6 April 1993 near the Aleutian Islands, when slats were accidentally deployed, resulting in the death of 2 passengers and 156 injuries.
- United Airlines Flight 826, a similar accident that occurred on 28 December 1997 over the Pacific Ocean, when encounter with severe turbulence resulted in the death of a passenger and 102 injuries.
- LATAM Airlines Flight 800, an in-flight upset that occurred on 11 March 2024 over the Tasman Sea, when a loss of altitude resulted in no fatalities but 50 injuries.
