= Lufthansa Cargo =

Cargo airline of Germany

Lufthansa Cargo AG

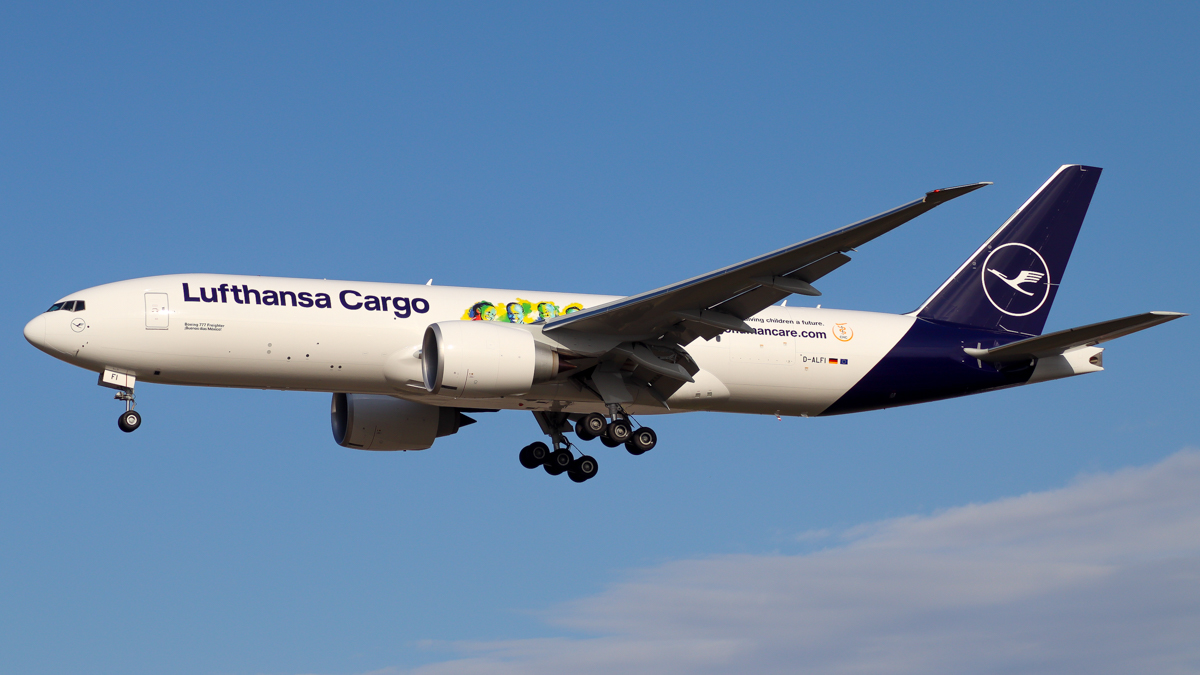
- A Boeing 777F of Lufthansa Cargo
IATA	ICAO	Call sign
LH	GEC	LUFTHANSA CARGO
- Founded: 1977; 49 years ago (as German Cargo)
- Commenced operations: 1993; 33 years ago (as Lufthansa Cargo)
- Hubs: Frankfurt Airport
- Subsidiaries: AeroLogic (50%)
- Fleet size: 12
- Destinations: 57
- Parent company: Lufthansa Group
- Headquarters: Frankfurt, Hesse, Germany
- Key people: Ashwin Bhat (CEO)
- Website: www.lufthansa-cargo.com

Lufthansa Cargo AG is a German cargo airline and a wholly owned subsidiary of Lufthansa. It operates worldwide air freight and logistics services and is headquartered at Frankfurt Airport, Lufthansa's main hub. Besides operating dedicated cargo planes, the company also has access to cargo capacities of 350 passenger aircraft of the Lufthansa Group.

== History ==
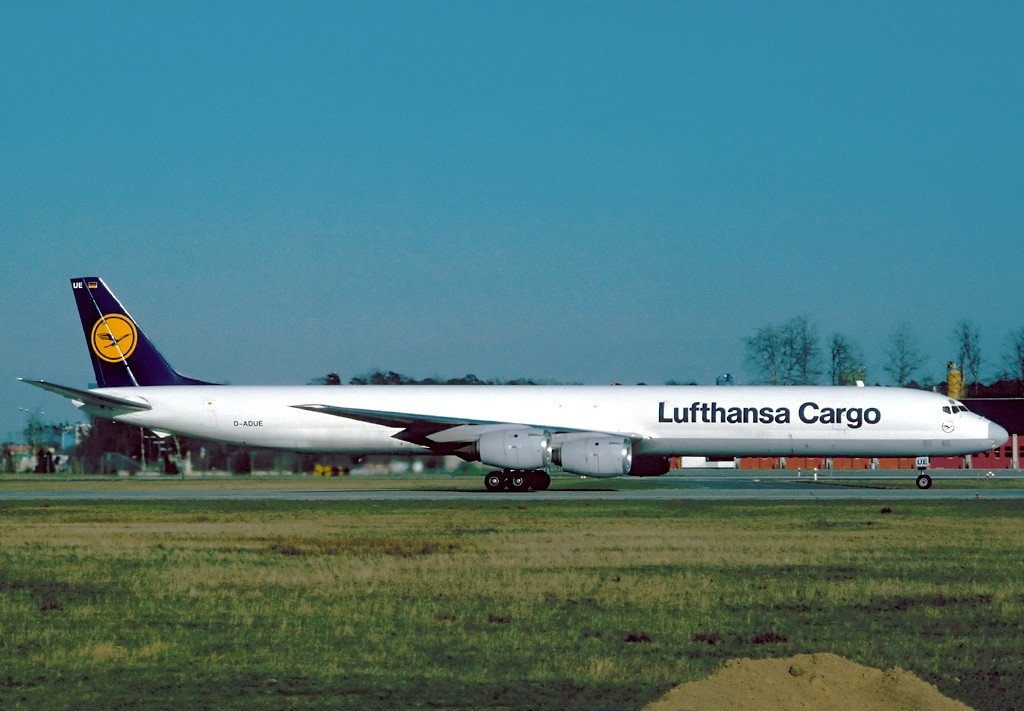
A former Lufthansa Cargo McDonnell Douglas DC-8-73 in 1994.

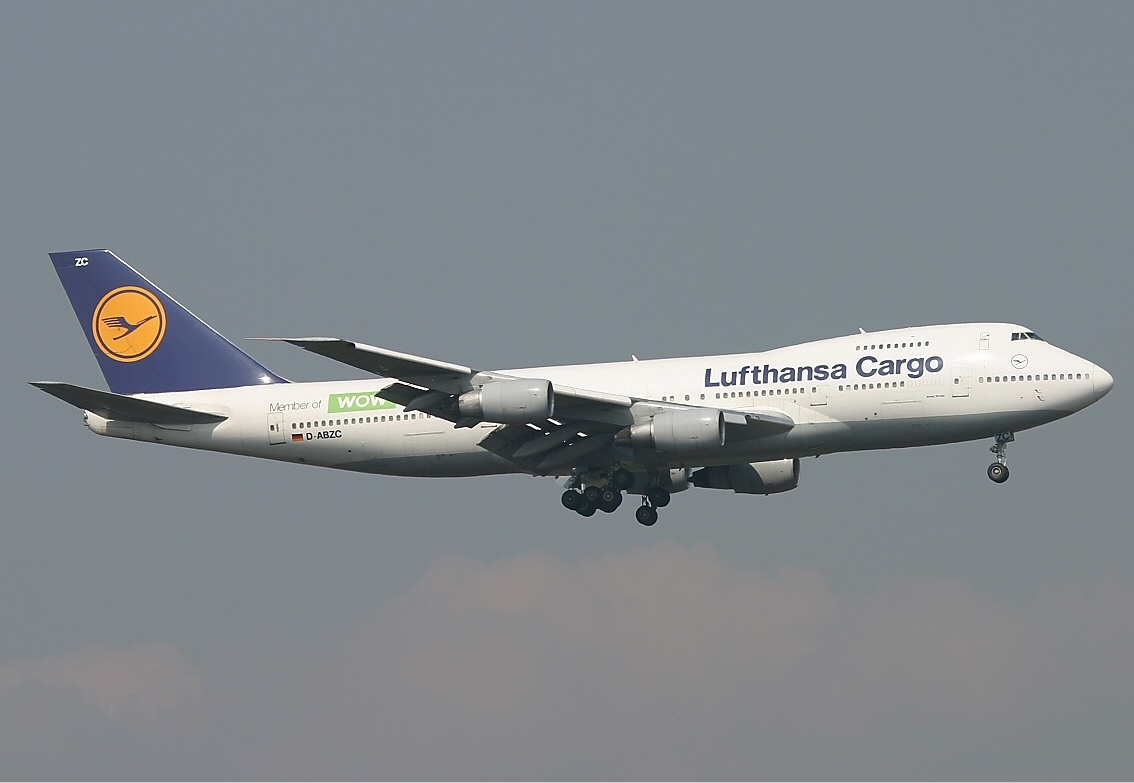
A former Lufthansa Cargo Boeing 747-200 featuring the WOW Alliance logo in 2004.

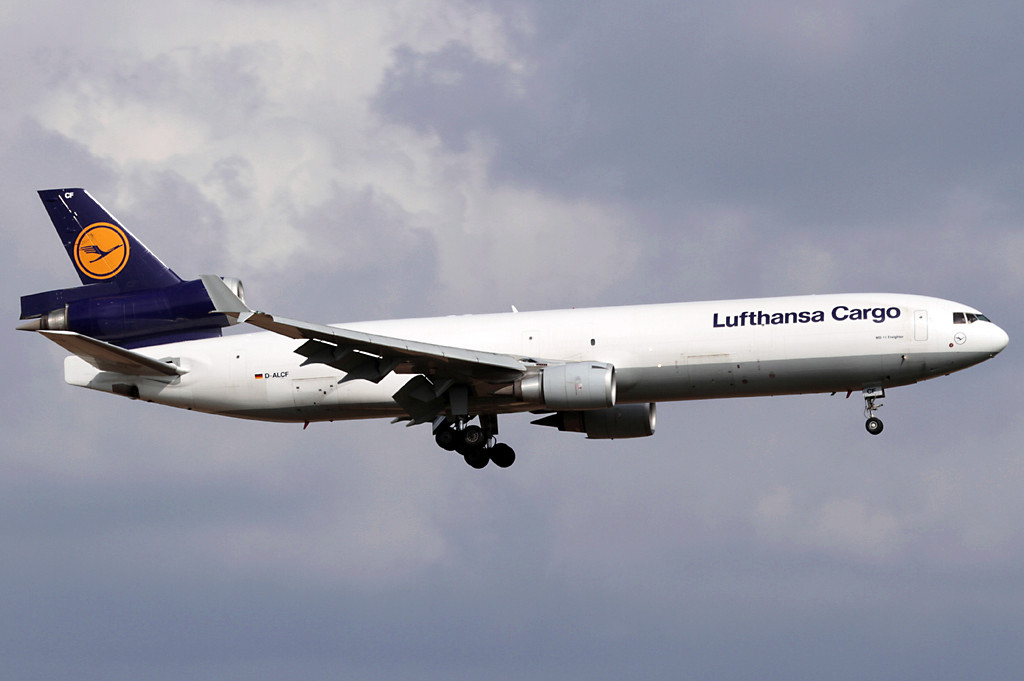
A now retired Lufthansa Cargo McDonnell Douglas MD-11F wearing the airline's former livery in 2010.

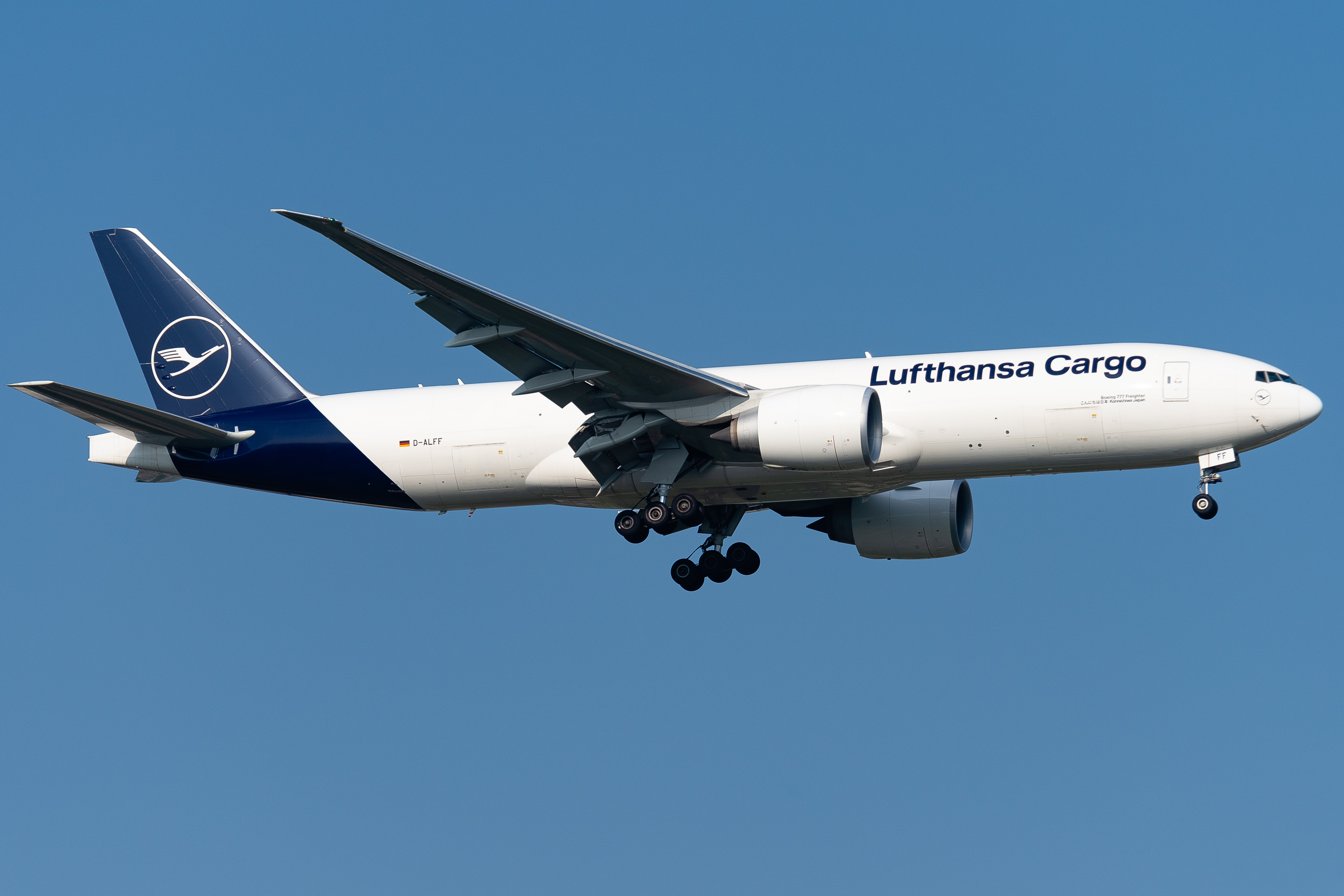
Lufthansa Cargo Boeing 777F

=== Foundation and early years ===
Recognizing the growing importance of the cargo business, Lufthansa established its cargo subsidiary in 1977 called German Cargo Services GmbH. Previously, cargo operations were executed in-house, under the Lufthansa Cargo name, when – in an effort to restructure the company – the cargo division was re-integrated into its parent, and split up into two parts (one for scheduled operations using Lufthansa-owned aircraft, and one for freight and logistics services using chartered or leased aircraft).

In 1996, Hinduja Cargo Services was founded as a joint venture between Hinduja Group and Lufthansa Cargo. The company operated a fleet of Boeing 727 freighters, flying from airports in the Indian subcontinent to feed Lufthansa Cargo's hub at Sharjah International Airport. The airline suspended operations in 2000 in favour of direct services from Frankfurt using Lufthansa Cargo aircraft.

=== Development since 2000 ===
In 2000, Lufthansa Cargo was a founding member of the WOW Alliance, a global cargo airline alliance, but left in 2007 as it did not see any benefits for the future.

In 2002 the special logistics company time:matters was founded, which was sold in the meantime, but is now again a wholly owned subsidiary of Lufthansa Cargo.

Lufthansa Cargo was created as a limited stock company on 30 November 2004, along with Lufthansa Cargo Charter. Lufthansa Cargo uses LH (the same IATA code as Lufthansa), as well as GEC (the former ICAO code of German Cargo) as airline codes.

As of 2007, Lufthansa Cargo used to operate a hub for intra-Asian flights at Astana International Airport in Kazakhstan, but was forced to relocate it to Yemelyanovo Airport in Russia in 2007, because otherwise the airline would have been banned from entering Russian airspace, in what was described as an act of economic blackmail by the Russian authorities.

In 2004, Jade Cargo International was founded as a joint venture between Shenzhen Airlines, Lufthansa Cargo, and the German Investment Corporation, a German governmental entity. This venture operated a fleet of six Boeing 747 freighters that flew to destinations that include Frankfurt, Chennai, Shanghai, and Chengdu. Jade ended operations in 2011.

As of 2011, all Lufthansa Cargo aircraft were based at Frankfurt Airport, the seventh busiest freight hub in the world, where the airline enjoys a strong co-operation with Fraport, the operator of the airport. Cargo facilities at the airport are divided into two places (Cargo City North and South), of which the first one is nearly exclusively used by Lufthansa Cargo. Lufthansa Cargo previously had a secondary base at Leipzig/Halle Airport, the European hub for DHL Express, from where it operated flights on behalf of DHL. Activities at this airport gradually came to an end following the formation of AeroLogic as a joint venture between Lufthansa and DHL, which henceforth caters for the DHL flights, allowing Lufthansa Cargo to concentrate on other services.

In May 2011, Lufthansa Cargo opened another hub at Rajiv Gandhi International Airport in Hyderabad, India, to transport temperature-sensitive goods, especially pharmaceuticals, between South East Asia and Europe (and onwards to the United States).

In 2019, heyworld GmbH was founded as a wholly owned subsidiary of Lufthansa Cargo with a focus on eCommerce logistics. The company and another Lufthansa subsidiary was planned to benefit from the Airbus A321F operations.

In September 2020, Lufthansa Cargo confirmed it was retiring its remaining McDonnell Douglas MD-11F during 2021 despite the grown freight demand in the wake of the COVID-19 pandemic. The last MD-11F flight took place on 17 October 2021.

In June 2024, Lufthansa Cargo announced the inauguration of its first freighter services from Munich Airport with scheduled flights to Istanbul.

== Destinations ==
As of August 2026, Lufthansa Cargo serves 57 cities worldwide.

Country	City	Airport	Notes	Ref(s)
Algeria	Algiers	Houari Boumediene Airport		
Argentina	Buenos Aires	Ministro Pistarini International Airport		
Armenia	Yerevan	Zvartnots International Airport		
Austria	Vienna	Vienna International Airport		
Brazil	Campinas	Viracopos International Airport		
Brazil	Curitiba	Afonso Pena International Airport		
Canada	Toronto	Toronto Pearson International Airport		
China	Beijing	Beijing Capital International Airport		
China	Chengdu	Chengdu Shuangliu International Airport		
China	Shenzhen	Shenzhen Bao'an International Airport		
China	Shanghai	Shanghai Pudong International Airport		
China	Zhengzhou	Zhengzhou Xinzheng International Airport		
Cyprus	Larnaca	Larnaca International Airport		
Egypt	Cairo	Cairo International Airport		
Finland	Helsinki	Helsinki Airport		
France	Paris	Charles de Gaulle Airport		
Germany	Frankfurt	Frankfurt Airport	Hub	
Germany	Leipzig	Leipzig/Halle Airport	Hub	
Germany	Munich	Munich Airport	Hub	
Greece	Athens	Athens International Airport		
Hong Kong	Hong Kong	Hong Kong International Airport		
India	Bengaluru	Kempegowda International Airport		
India	Chennai	Chennai International Airport		
India	Delhi	Indira Gandhi International Airport		
India	Mumbai	Chhatrapati Shivaji Maharaj International Airport		
India	Mumbai	Navi Mumbai International Airport		
India	Hyderabad	Rajiv Gandhi International Airport		
Ireland	Dublin	Dublin Airport		
Israel	Tel Aviv	Ben Gurion Airport		
Italy	Milan	Milan Malpensa Airport		
Italy	Rome	Rome Fiumicino Airport		
Japan	Tokyo	Narita International Airport		
Kazakhstan	Almaty	Almaty International Airport		
Latvia	Riga	Riga International Airport		
Malta	Luqa	Malta International Airport		
Mexico	Guadalajara	Guadalajara International Airport		
Mexico	Mexico City	Felipe Ángeles International Airport		
Mexico	Monterrey	Monterrey International Airport		
Morocco	Casablanca	Mohammed V International Airport		
Netherlands	Amsterdam	Amsterdam Airport Schiphol		
Norway	Stavanger	Stavanger Airport		
Poland	Katowice	Katowice Airport		
South Korea	Seoul	Incheon International Airport		
Spain	Madrid	Madrid–Barajas Airport		
Sweden	Stockholm	Stockholm Arlanda Airport		
Taiwan	Taipei	Taoyuan International Airport		
Tunisia	Tunis	Tunis–Carthage International Airport		
Turkey	Istanbul	Istanbul Airport		
United Arab Emirates	Dubai	Al Maktoum International Airport		
United Kingdom	Birmingham	Birmingham Airport		
United Kingdom	London	Heathrow Airport		
United States	Atlanta	Hartsfield–Jackson Atlanta International Airport		
United States	Chicago	O'Hare International Airport		
United States	Dallas	Dallas Fort Worth International Airport		
United States	Los Angeles	Los Angeles International Airport		
United States	New York City	John F. Kennedy International Airport		
United States	Houston	George Bush Intercontinental Airport		
United States	Seattle	Seattle–Tacoma International Airport		
Uruguay	Montevideo	Carrasco International Airport		
Uzbekistan	Tashkent	Tashkent International Airport		
Vietnam	Hanoi	Noi Bai International Airport		
Vietnam	Ho Chi Minh City	Tan Son Nhat International Airport		

== Fleet ==
=== Current fleet ===
As of July 2026, Lufthansa Cargo operates the following aircraft:

Aircraft	In service	Orders	Notes
Airbus A321-200P2F	4	—	
Boeing 777F	12	1	
Boeing 777-8F	—	7	Deliveries between 2027 and 2030.
Total	16	8	

=== Fleet development ===
The initial fleet of Lufthansa Cargo previously belonged to German Cargo, and was expanded by cargo-converted former Lufthansa Boeing 747-200s. From 1998, the airline began to gradually phase out all other aircraft types in favour of a fleet entirely consisting of the McDonnell Douglas MD-11 (which Lufthansa received as freighter versions in 2001 after MD-11 production ended) version and its successor, the Boeing 777 freighter. In March 2011, an order of five Boeing 777F was announced, the same aircraft type which had earlier been chosen for AeroLogic. Almost the entire Lufthansa Cargo fleet today is composed of purpose-built freighter aircraft. Lufthansa Cargo had planned to retire its remaining MD-11s by December 2020, but the retirement was delayed due to the increased cargo demand caused by the COVID-19 pandemic.

With the delivery of the first Boeing 777F, Lufthansa Cargo started to name their aircraft using typical greetings of the countries they serve. The first 777F was named Good day, USA, while an MD-11F was named Buenos días México for example.

In October 2024, Lufthansa CityLine transferred all four of its Airbus A321-200/P2F to Lufthansa Cargo which it had operated for them.

=== Former fleet ===
As of August 2025, the Lufthansa Cargo fleet consisted of 4 Airbus A321P2F and 12 Boeing 777F.

Over the years, the following aircraft types were operated:

Aircraft	Total	Introduced	Retired	Notes
Boeing 737-200F	3	1993	1995	
Boeing 737-300SF	1	1994	1997	
Boeing 747-200F	10	1993	2005	
Douglas DC-8-73F	5	1993	1997	
McDonnell Douglas MD-11F	19	1998	2021	One plane, registered as D-ALCC, wore the "Farewell MD-11" livery.

== Accidents and incidents ==
- On 11 December 1978, the Lufthansa heist took place. A group of criminals managed to get into the Lufthansa Cargo offices at JFK Airport in New York City. They threatened staff by pointing guns and stole more than $5 million ($27 million in today's money). Only a small portion of the money was recovered.
- On 26 July 1979, a Boeing 707 freighter (registration D-ABUY) operating Flight 527 crashed into a hilly slope shortly after take-off, killing all 3 crew-members on board. The cause of the accident was mainly attributed towards the lack of Brazilian Air Traffic control to pay necessary attention to aircraft in their airspace and warn aircraft of the impending collision with terrain.
- On 18 October 1983, a Boeing 747-200 freighter registered D-ABYU operating as Flight 683 overshot the runway during an aborted takeoff at Kai Tak Airport in Hong Kong having experienced a failure of the number 2 engine. The aircraft was substantially damaged, but was repaired and returned to service.
- On 7 July 1999, a Boeing 727-243 freighter leased from Hinduja Cargo Services operating as Lufthansa Cargo Flight 8533 from Nepal to India, crashed into a mountain after takeoff from Tribhuvan International Airport in Kathmandu, Nepal, killing all five people on board.
- On 7 November 2004, at 16:35 local time, a Boeing 747-200 freighter, owned and operated by Air Atlanta Icelandic, overshot the runway upon take-off at Sharjah International Airport and was damaged beyond repair. The aircraft, registered TF-ARR, had been leased by Lufthansa Cargo to operate Flight 8457 to Frankfurt Airport. The pilots had decided to abort the take-off run even though the remaining runway length did not suffice to bring the aircraft to a halt because of a burst tyre and the ATC notification of an alleged fire (which turned out to be not true). The four people on board were not injured.
- On 27 July 2010, at 11:38 local time, Lufthansa Cargo Flight 8460, an MD-11 registered D-ALCQ, crashed upon landing at King Khalid International Airport, Riyadh, Saudi Arabia and was damaged beyond repair in the ensuing fire. The Pilot in command and the Officer — the only two people on board — were able to leave the aircraft by themselves.
- On 24 November 2013, Lufthansa Cargo Flight 8258, an MD-11 registered D-ALCE, bounced during landing at Viracopos International Airport and initiated a go around. The aircraft landed with substantial damage. It was later repaired and returned to service.
