= AeroLogic =

German cargo airline

AeroLogic GmbH

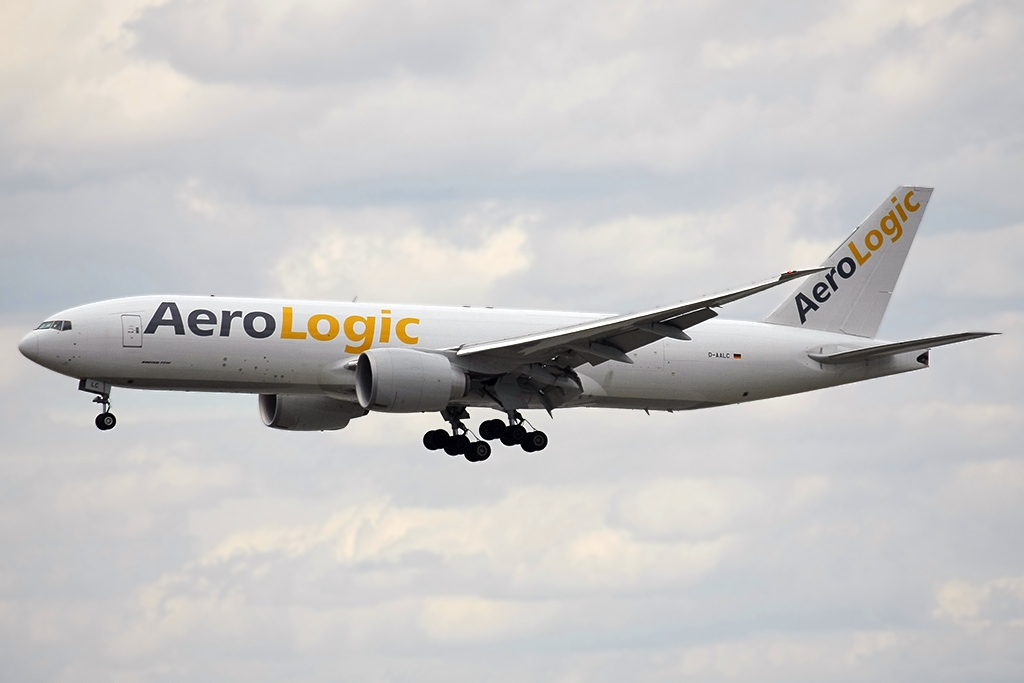
IATA	ICAO	Call sign
3S	BOX	GERMAN CARGO
- Founded: 12 September 2007; 19 years ago
- Commenced operations: 29 June 2009; 17 years ago
- Hubs: Frankfurt Airport; Leipzig/Halle Airport
- Fleet size: 28
- Destinations: 29
- Parent company: DHL (50%); Lufthansa Cargo (50%)
- Headquarters: Schkeuditz, Germany
- Website: www.aerologic.aero

AeroLogic GmbH is a German cargo airline based in Schkeuditz near Leipzig. It is a joint venture between DHL and Lufthansa Cargo which operates scheduled international and long-haul cargo services out of its hubs at Leipzig/Halle Airport and Frankfurt Airport.

== History ==
The company was founded by DHL Express and Lufthansa Cargo on 12 September 2007. Flight operations started on 29 June 2009, following the delivery of its first aircraft on May 12th of that year, a Boeing 777 Freighter, making AeroLogic the first German operator of that type.

== Fleet ==
=== Current fleet ===
As of July 2026, AeroLogic operates the following aircraft:

AeroLogic fleet
Aircraft	In service	Orders
Boeing 777F	28	2
Total	28	2
