= List of Singapore Airlines destinations =

As of January 2025, Singapore Airlines (and its subsidiary Scoot) flies to 120 international destinations in 46 countries from its primary hub in Singapore Changi Airport. China is connected to sixteen airports, the highest number of destinations, India with 8 destinations, seven to Australia and six destinations in the US.

In 1992, Singapore Airlines discontinued flying to Madrid.

After the Asian Financial Crisis in 1997, Singapore Airlines discontinued flying to Berlin, Darwin, Cairns, Hangzhou, Kagoshima, and Sendai. Toronto was discontinued in 1994. During the SARS outbreak in 2003/04, Singapore Airlines discontinued flying to Brussels, Las Vegas, Chicago, Hiroshima, Kaohsiung, Mauritius, Vienna, Madrid, Seattle, Shenzhen and Surabaya. In addition, Singapore Airlines discontinued flights to Vancouver and Amritsar in 2009, and São Paulo in 2016.

Singapore Airlines presently operates the longest and second longest flights in the world, non-stop to New York–JFK and Newark respectively, using the Airbus A350-900ULR.

Between 2000-2010s, the airline suspended services in Pakistan due to lack of safety in Pakistan.

Singapore to Newark was the world's longest flight from 2004-2013, and 2018-2021, when they started JFK to Singapore.

Previously, it operated to Newark with the Airbus A340-500 aircraft until they were phased out in 2013. Non-stop service to Los Angeles, also previously operated with the A340-500, also resumed in November 2018 with the new A350-900ULR.

In 2014, the airline announced they would end services in Cairo and Riyadh due to low demand.

In October 2016, Singapore Airlines restarted its nonstop service from Singapore to the US with the launch of its new Singapore-San Francisco route. The route flies A350-900 aircraft and includes Business, Premium Economy and Economy classes.

The former Capital Express Route linking Singapore and Wellington via Canberra was replaced in May 2018 with Singapore-Sydney-Canberra-Singapore and Singapore-Melbourne-Wellington-Melbourne-Singapore routes.

In September 2020, the carrier announced that it would suspend services to Canberra, Dusseldorf, Stockholm and Wellington due to a drop in demand arising from the COVID-19 pandemic.

In 2022, the airline reopened services to Surabaya, many years after it ended services to that destination during the 1997 Asian financial crisis.

== List (excluding destinations served by Scoot) ==
Country	City	Airport	Notes	Refs
Australia	Adelaide	Adelaide Airport		
Australia	Brisbane	Brisbane Airport		
Australia	Cairns	Cairns Airport		
Australia	Canberra	Canberra Airport	Terminated	
Australia	Darwin	Darwin International Airport		
Australia	Melbourne	Melbourne Airport		
Australia	Perth	Perth Airport		
Australia	Sydney	Sydney Airport		
Australia	Sydney	Western Sydney Airport	Begins 23 November 2026	
Austria	Vienna	Vienna International Airport	Terminated	
Bahrain	Manama	Bahrain International Airport	Terminated	
Bangladesh	Dhaka	Hazrat Shahjalal International Airport		
Belgium	Brussels	Brussels Airport		
Brazil	São Paulo	São Paulo/Guarulhos International Airport	Terminated	
Brunei	Bandar Seri Begawan	Brunei International Airport		
Cambodia	Phnom Penh	Techo International Airport		
Cambodia	Siem Reap; Angkor Wat	Siem Reap–Angkor International Airport		
Canada	Toronto	Toronto Pearson International Airport	Terminated	
Canada	Vancouver	Vancouver International Airport	Terminated	
China	Beijing	Beijing Capital International Airport		
China	Beijing	Beijing Daxing International Airport		
China	Chengdu	Chengdu Shuangliu International Airport	Terminated	
China	Chengdu	Chengdu Tianfu International Airport		
China	Chongqing	Chongqing Jiangbei International Airport		
China	Guangzhou	Guangzhou Baiyun International Airport		
China	Hangzhou	Hangzhou Xiaoshan International Airport		
China	Nanjing	Nanjing Lukou International Airport	Terminated	
China	Shanghai	Shanghai Pudong International Airport		
China	Shenzhen	Shenzhen Bao'an International Airport		
China	Xiamen	Xiamen Gaoqi International Airport		
Denmark	Copenhagen	Copenhagen Airport		
Egypt	Cairo	Cairo International Airport	Terminated	
France	Paris	Charles de Gaulle Airport		
France	Paris	Orly Airport	Terminated	
Germany	Berlin	Berlin Schönefeld Airport	Airport closed	
Germany	Düsseldorf	Düsseldorf Airport	Terminated	
Germany	Frankfurt	Frankfurt Airport		
Germany	Munich	Munich Airport		
Greece	Athens	Athens International Airport	Terminated	
Hong Kong	Hong Kong	Hong Kong International Airport		
Hong Kong	Hong Kong	Kai Tak Airport	Airport closed	
India	Ahmedabad	Ahmedabad Airport		
India	Amritsar	Sri Guru Ram Dass Jee International Airport	Terminated	
India	Bengaluru	Kempegowda International Airport		
India	Chennai	Chennai International Airport		
India	Delhi	Indira Gandhi International Airport		
India	Hyderabad	Rajiv Gandhi International Airport		
India	Kochi	Cochin International Airport		
India	Kolkata	Netaji Subhas Chandra Bose International Airport		
India	Mumbai	Chhatrapati Shivaji Maharaj International Airport		
India	Pune	Pune International Airport	Terminated	
Indonesia	Bandung	Kertajati International Airport	Terminated	
Indonesia	Denpasar	Ngurah Rai International Airport		
Indonesia	Jakarta	Halim Perdanakusuma International Airport	Terminated	
Indonesia	Jakarta	Soekarno–Hatta International Airport		
Indonesia	Medan	Kualanamu International Airport		
Indonesia	Surabaya	Juanda International Airport		
Iran	Tehran	Mehrabad International Airport	Terminated	
Italy	Milan	Milan Malpensa Airport		
Italy	Rome	Rome Fiumicino Airport		
Japan	Fukuoka	Fukuoka Airport		
Japan	Hiroshima	Hiroshima Airport	Terminated	
Japan	Nagoya	Chubu Centrair International Airport		
Japan	Osaka	Kansai International Airport		
Japan	Sapporo	New Chitose Airport	Seasonal	
Japan	Sendai	Sendai Airport	Terminated	
Japan	Tokyo	Haneda Airport		
Japan	Tokyo	Narita International Airport		
Kuwait	Kuwait City	Kuwait International Airport	Terminated	
Macau	Macau	Macau International Airport	Terminated	
Malaysia	Kota Kinabalu	Kota Kinabalu International Airport	Terminated	
Malaysia	Kuala Lumpur	Kuala Lumpur International Airport		
Malaysia	Kuantan	Sultan Haji Ahmad Shah Airport	Terminated	
Malaysia	Kuching	Kuching International Airport	Terminated	
Malaysia	Langkawi	Langkawi International Airport	Terminated	
Malaysia	Penang	Penang International Airport		
Maldives	Malé	Velana International Airport		
Malta	Luqa	Malta International Airport	Terminated	
Mauritius	Port Louis	Sir Seewoosagur Ramgoolam International Airport	Terminated	
Myanmar	Mandalay	Mandalay International Airport	Terminated	
Myanmar	Yangon	Yangon International Airport		
Nepal	Kathmandu	Tribhuvan International Airport		
Netherlands	Amsterdam	Amsterdam Airport Schiphol		
New Zealand	Auckland	Auckland Airport		
New Zealand	Christchurch	Christchurch Airport		
New Zealand	Wellington	Wellington Airport	Terminated	
Pakistan	Karachi	Jinnah International Airport	Terminated	
Pakistan	Lahore	Allama Iqbal International Airport	Terminated	
Papua New Guinea	Port Moresby	Port Moresby International Airport	Terminated	
Philippines	Cebu	Mactan–Cebu International Airport		
Philippines	Davao	Francisco Bangoy International Airport	Terminated	
Philippines	Manila	Ninoy Aquino International Airport		
Russia	Moscow	Moscow Domodedovo Airport	Terminated	
Saudi Arabia	Dhahran	Dhahran International Airport	Airport closed	
Saudi Arabia	Jeddah	King Abdulaziz International Airport	Terminated	
Saudi Arabia	Riyadh	King Khalid International Airport		
Singapore	Singapore	Changi Airport	Hub	
Singapore	Singapore	Singapore Paya Lebar International Airport	Airport closed	
South Africa	Cape Town	Cape Town International Airport		
South Africa	Durban	Durban International Airport	Terminated	
South Africa	Johannesburg	O. R. Tambo International Airport		
South Korea	Busan	Gimhae International Airport		
South Korea	Seoul	Incheon International Airport		
Spain	Barcelona	Josep Tarradellas Barcelona–El Prat Airport		
Spain	Madrid	Adolfo Suárez Madrid–Barajas Airport		
Sri Lanka	Colombo	Bandaranaike International Airport		
Sweden	Stockholm	Stockholm Arlanda Airport	Terminated	
Switzerland	Zurich	Zurich Airport		
Taiwan	Kaohsiung	Kaohsiung International Airport	Terminated	
Taiwan	Taipei	Taoyuan International Airport		
Thailand	Bangkok	Don Mueang International Airport	Terminated	
Thailand	Bangkok	Suvarnabhumi Airport		
Thailand	Phuket	Phuket International Airport		
Turkey	Istanbul	Istanbul Airport		
Turkey	Istanbul	Atatürk Airport	Airport closed	
United Arab Emirates	Abu Dhabi	Zayed International Airport	Terminated	
United Arab Emirates	Dubai	Dubai International Airport		
United Kingdom	London	Gatwick Airport		
United Kingdom	London	Heathrow Airport		
United Kingdom	Manchester	Manchester Airport		
United States	Chicago	O'Hare International Airport	Terminated	
United States	Honolulu	Daniel K. Inouye International Airport	Terminated	
United States	Houston	George Bush Intercontinental Airport	Terminated	
United States	Las Vegas	Harry Reid International Airport	Terminated	
United States	Los Angeles	Los Angeles International Airport		
United States	New York City	John F. Kennedy International Airport		
United States	Newark	Newark Liberty International Airport		
United States	San Francisco	San Francisco International Airport		
United States	Seattle	Seattle–Tacoma International Airport		
Vietnam	Da Nang	Da Nang International Airport		
Vietnam	Hanoi	Noi Bai International Airport		
Vietnam	Ho Chi Minh City	Tan Son Nhat International Airport		
