= Phoenix Deer Valley Airport =

Airport in Maricopa County, Arizona

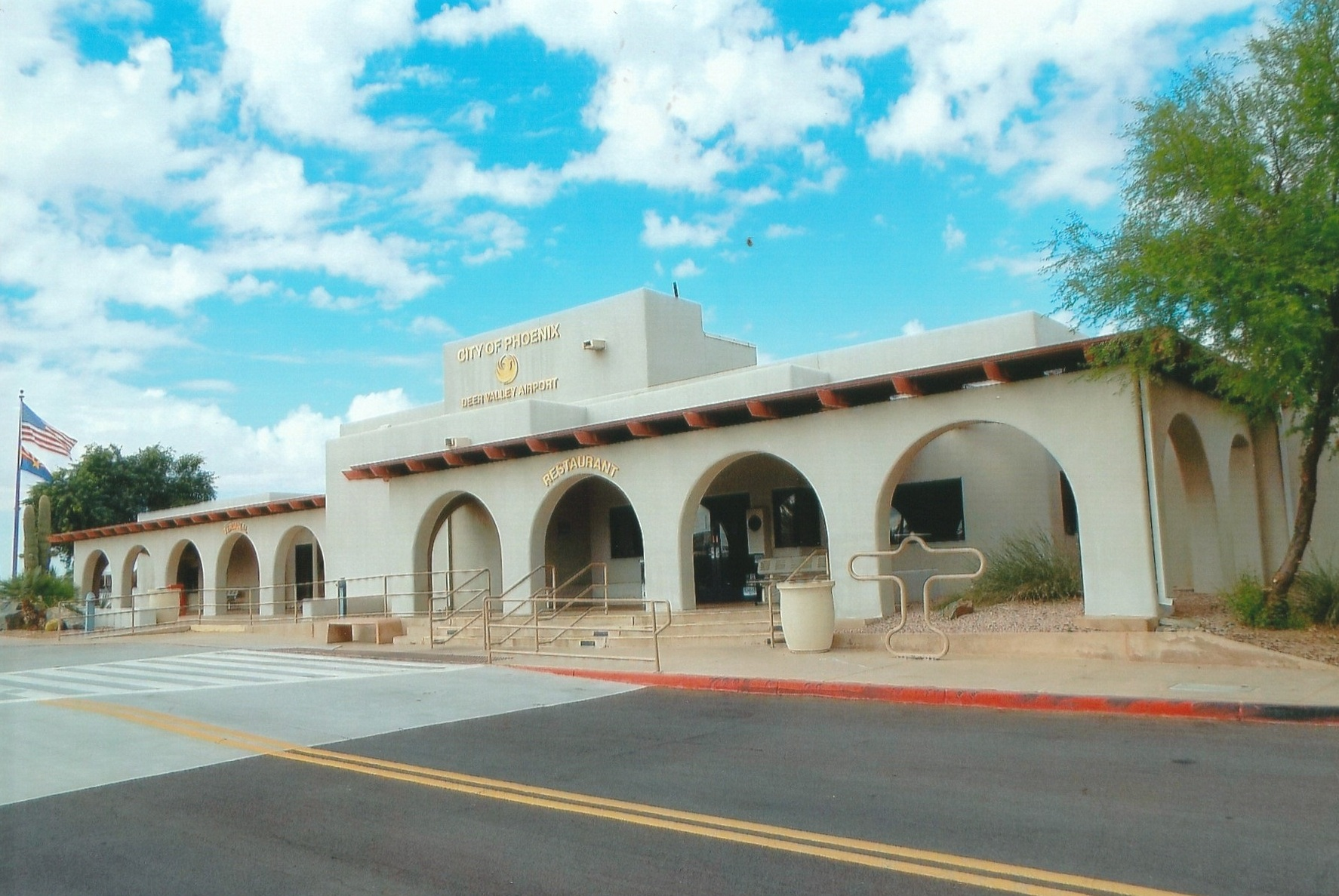
- Phoenix Deer Valley Airport terminal
- IATA: DVT; ICAO: KDVT; FAA LID: DVT

Summary
- Airport type: Public
- Owner: City of Phoenix
- Serves: Phoenix, Arizona
- Built: 1960
- Elevation AMSL: 1,478 ft / 450 m
- Coordinates: 33°41′18″N 112°04′57″W
- Website: https://deervalleyairport.com
- Interactive map of Phoenix Deer Valley Airport

Runways
Direction	Length		Surface
Direction	ft	m	Surface
07R/25L	8,196	2,498	Asphalt
07L/25R	4,500	1,372	Asphalt

Statistics (2020)
- Aircraft operations: 402,444
- Based aircraft: 920
- Sources: FAA, ACI, GCR,

Phoenix Deer Valley Airport (IATA: DVT, ICAO: KDVT, FAA LID: DVT) is a public airport 24 miles (21 nmi; 39 km) north of central Phoenix, in Maricopa County, Arizona, United States, within the Phoenix city limits. It is owned by the City of Phoenix. The FAA's National Plan of Integrated Airport Systems for 2009–2013 categorized it as a reliever airport for Phoenix Sky Harbor International Airport.

In 2020 the airport recorded 402,444 aircraft movements, making it the 5th busiest airport in the world by aircraft movements and the busiest general aviation airport in the world. The airport's high ranking is attributed to its large general aviation business and its status as the home of two popular flight schools.

== History ==
In the 1950s, the Sperry Flight Systems Company established an aerospace/defense manufacturing facility on land north of Phoenix's city limits in what was mostly undeveloped desert. While the plant was under construction, roughly 480 acres to the north nearby was also leased as the potential site for a new flight testing facility. Later on this land was developed into a private airport and then sold, in 1971, to the City of Phoenix. A number of flight research and general aviation firms soon made the new airport their base of operations. Federal Aviation Administration funding enabled upgrades to the terminal building, flight control tower, runways, and many other facilities and safety features.

== Usage ==
There is no scheduled airline service, but charter service is available through several companies.

== Facilities and aircraft ==
The airport covers 914 acres (370 ha) at an elevation of 1,478 feet (450 m). It has two asphalt runways: 7R/25L is 8,196 by 100 feet (2,498 x 30 m) and 7L/25R is 4,500 by 75 feet (1,372 x 23 m).

In 2020 the airport had 402,444 aircraft operations, average 1,102 per day: 99% general aviation, <1% military, 1% air taxi, and <1% airline. 920 aircraft were then based at the airport: 773 single-engine, 93 multi-engine, 22 jet, 18 helicopter, 10 glider, 2 ultralight, and 2 military.

== In popular culture ==
Several scenes of the 1980 aerobatics movie Cloud Dancer were filmed at this airport.

== Incidents and accidents ==
- On August 20, 2018, an accident occurred when an Acroduster airplane crashed at Seventh Street near the airport as it was trying to land on it, killing 54-year-old pilot Theodore Rich and his 49-year-old passenger, Elaine Carpenter.
- On April 19, 2025, an accident occurred when a Senior Aero Sport aircraft experienced an engine issue and crashed into a carport near the airport. The pilot sustained minor injuries.

== Gallery ==
Phoenix Deer Valley Airport has hosted various air shows of vintage World War II aircraft. Among the events which have taken place is "Wings of Freedom".

Deer Valley Airport

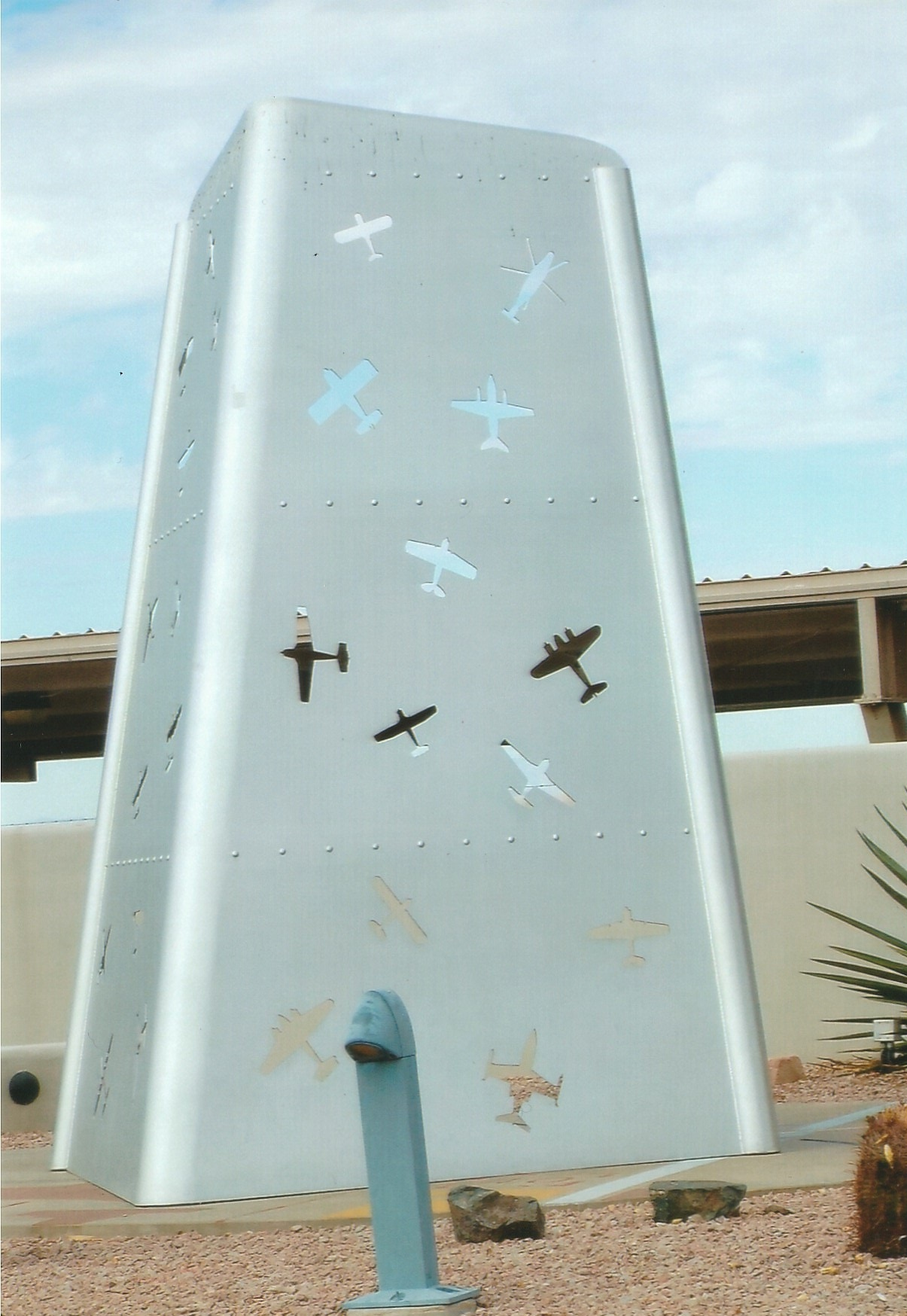
Deer Valley Airport Monument

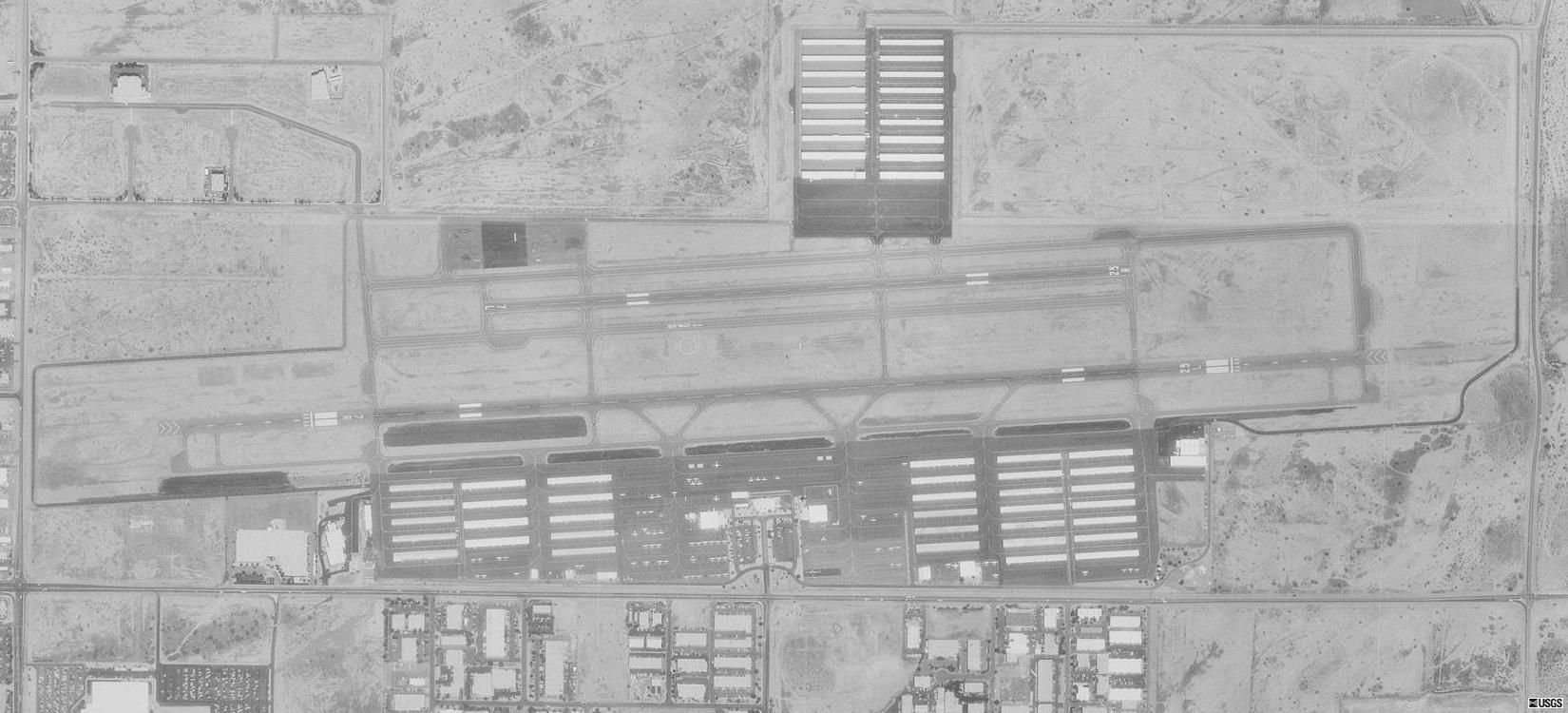
USGS aerial image, 1997

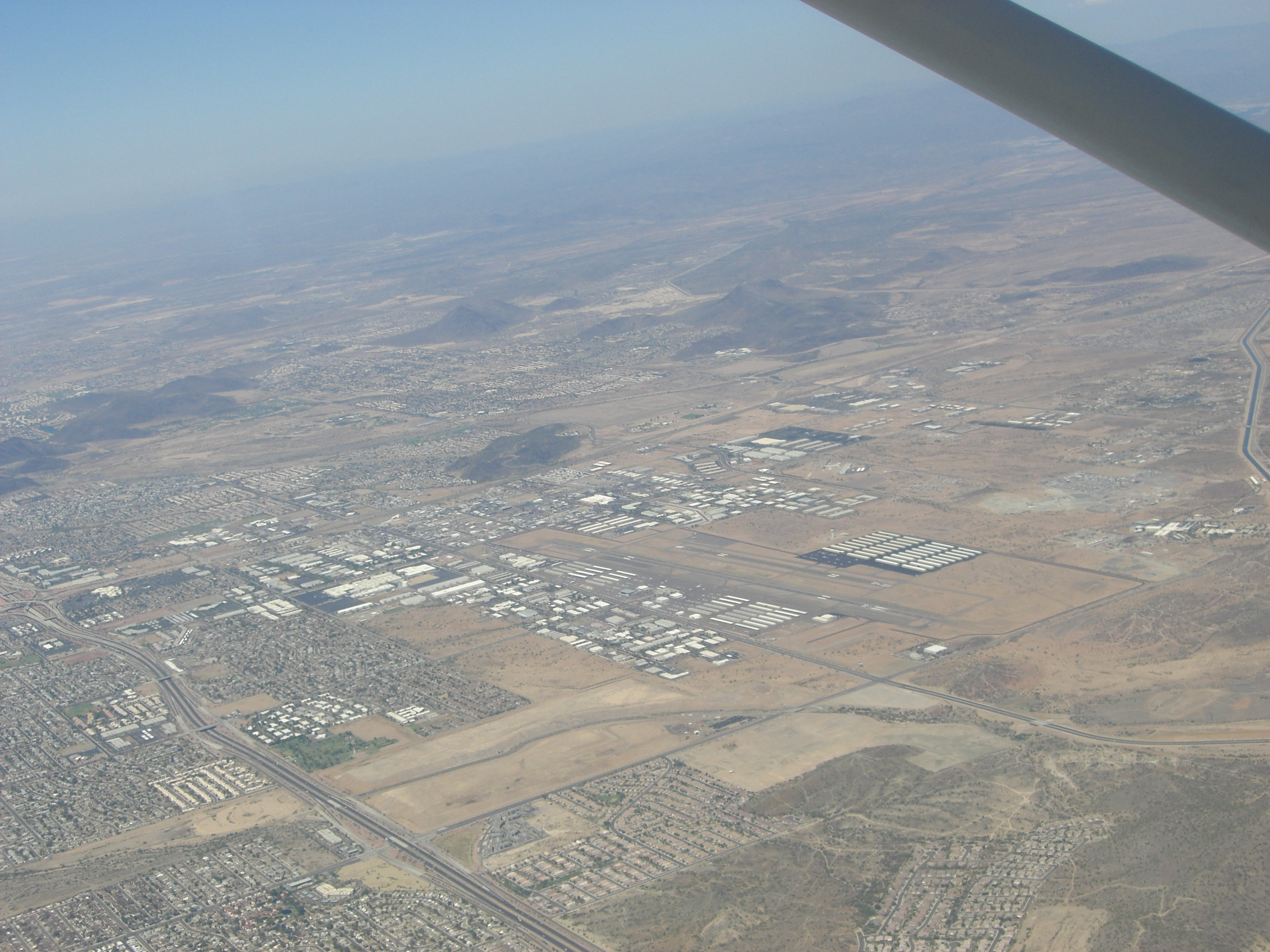
Deer Valley Airport

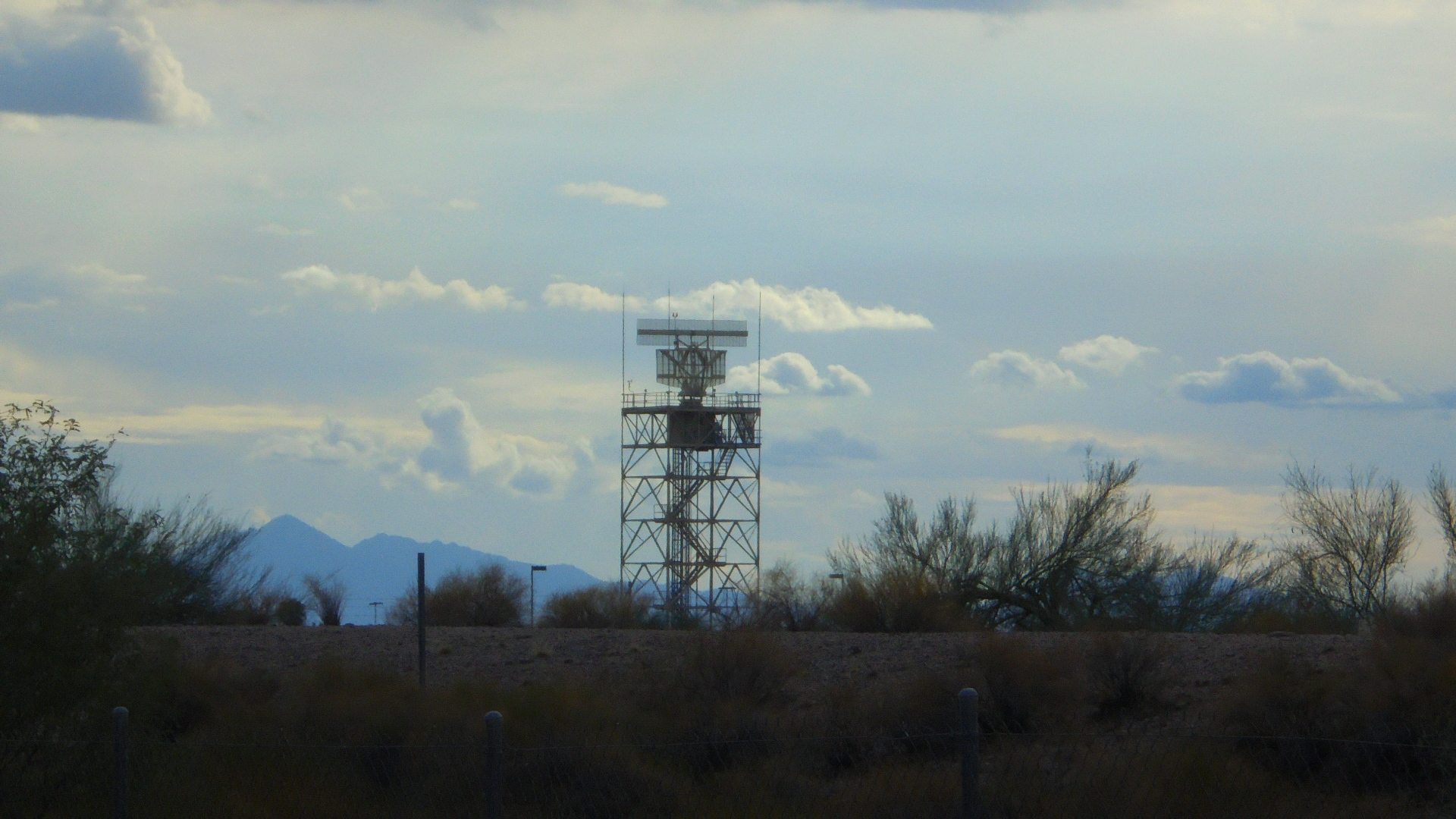
Deer Valley Airport beacon

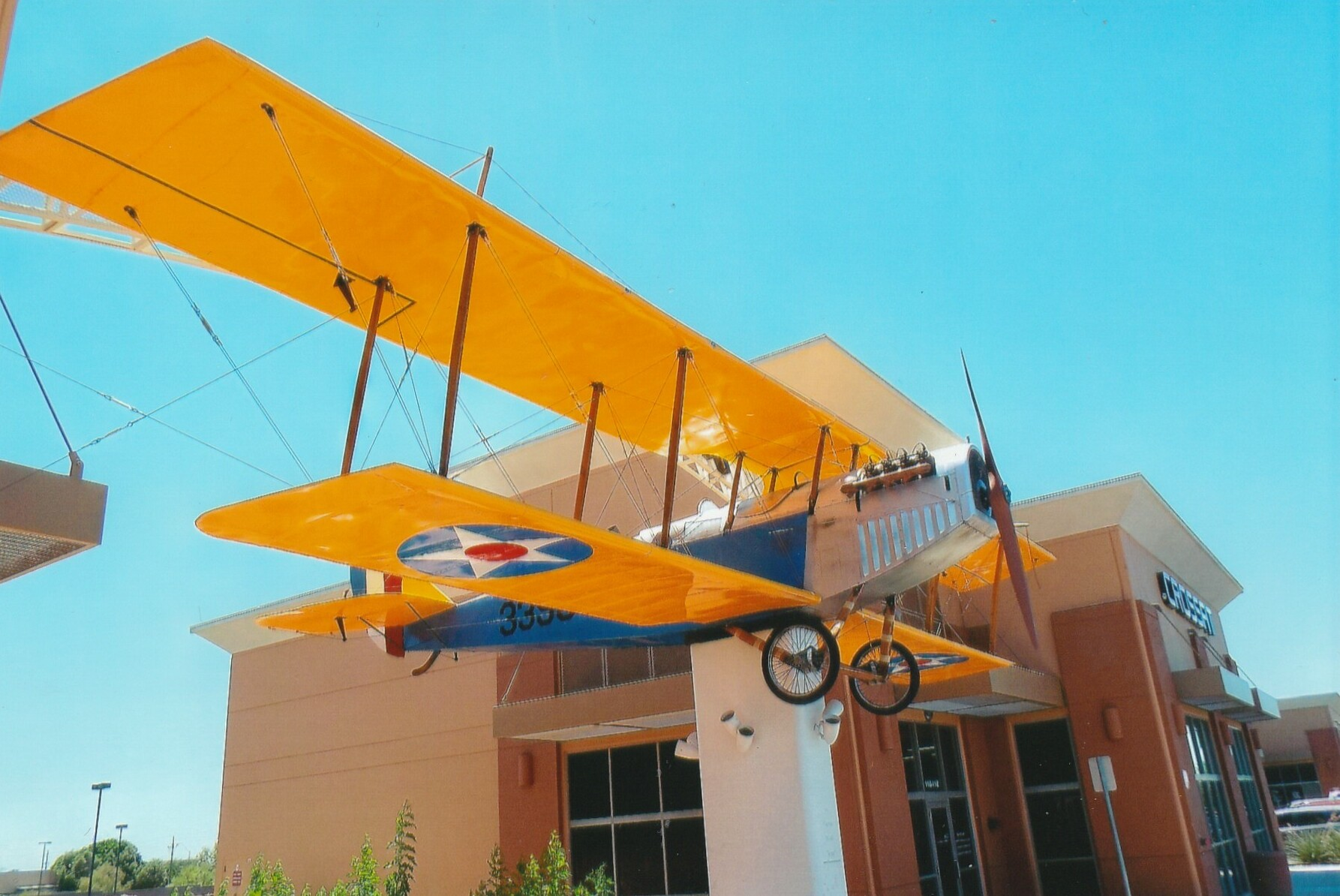
1921 Curtis JN-4D "Jenny"

== See also ==
- List of airports in Arizona
