= List of busiest airports by aircraft movements =

The world's busiest airports by aircraft movements are measured by total movements (data provided by Airports Council International). A movement is a landing or takeoff of an aircraft and includes both air transport movements and general aviation.

== 2025 statistics ==
Airports Council International's preliminary full-year figures
Rank	Airport	Location	Code	Total movements	Rank change	Change
1	(United States) O'Hare International Airport	Chicago, Illinois, United States	ORD/KORD	860,015	▲1	▲10.8%
2	(United States) Hartsfield–Jackson Atlanta International Airport	Atlanta, Georgia, United States	ATL/KATL	807,625	▼1	▲1.4%
3	(United States) Dallas/Fort Worth International Airport	Coppell, Euless, Grapevine, and Irving, Texas, United States	DFW/KDFW	743,394	Steady	▲0.0%
4	(United States) Denver International Airport	Denver, Colorado, United States	DEN/KDEN	701,335	Steady	▲1.7%
5	(United States) Harry Reid International Airport	Paradise, Nevada, United States	LAS/KLAS	586,046	Steady	▼4.6%
6	(United States) Los Angeles International Airport	Los Angeles, California, United States	LAX/KLAX	580,996	▲1	▼0.1%
7	(United States) Charlotte Douglas International Airport	Charlotte, North Carolina, United States	CLT/KCLT	574,193	▼1	▼3.8%
8	(China) Shanghai Pudong International Airport	Pudong, Shanghai, China	PVG/ZSPD	557,046	Steady	▲5.5%
9	(China) Guangzhou Baiyun International Airport	Guangzhou, Guangdong, China	CAN/ZGGG	550,512	▲1	▲7.5%
10	(Turkey) Istanbul Airport	Istanbul, Turkey	IST/LTFM	549,309	▼1	▲6.2%

== 2024 statistics ==
Airports Council International's preliminary full-year figures are as follows:

Rank	Airport	Location	Code	Total Movements	Rank Change	Change
1.	(United States) Hartsfield–Jackson Atlanta International Airport	Atlanta, Georgia, United States	ATL/KATL	796,224	Steady	▲2.6%
2.	(United States) O'Hare International Airport	Chicago, Illinois, United States	ORD/KORD	776,036	Steady	▲7.7%
3.	(United States) Dallas/Fort Worth International Airport	Coppell, Euless, Grapevine, and Irving, Texas, United States	DFW/KDFW	743,203	Steady	▲7.8%
4.	(United States) Denver International Airport	Denver, Colorado, United States	DEN/KDEN	689,368	Steady	▲4.9%
5.	(United States) Harry Reid International Airport	Paradise, Nevada, United States	LAS/KLAS	613,973	Steady	▲0.4%
6.	(United States) Charlotte Douglas International Airport	Charlotte, North Carolina, United States	CLT/KCLT	596,583	▲1	▲10.7%
7.	(United States) Los Angeles International Airport	Los Angeles, California, United States	LAX/KLAX	581,779	▼1	1.2%
8.	(China) Shanghai Pudong International Airport	Pudong, Shanghai, China	PVG/ZSPD	528,074	▲10	▲21.7%
9.	(Turkey) Istanbul Airport	Istanbul, Turkey	IST/LTFM	517,284	▼1	▲2.2%
10.	(China) Guangzhou Baiyun International Airport	Guangzhou, Guangdong, China	CAN/ZGGG	512,004	▲4	▲12.3%

== 2023 statistics ==
Airports Council International's preliminary full-year figures are as follows:

Rank	Airport	Location	Code	Total Movements	Rank Change	Change
1.	(United States) Hartsfield–Jackson Atlanta International Airport	Atlanta, Georgia, United States	ATL/KATL	775,818	0	7.1%
2.	(United States) O'Hare International Airport	Chicago, Illinois, United States	ORD/KORD	720,582	0	1.3%
3.	(United States) Dallas/Fort Worth International Airport	Coppell, Euless, Grapevine, and Irving, Texas, United States	DFW/KDFW	689,569	0	5.0%
4.	(United States) Denver International Airport	Denver, Colorado, United States	DEN/KDEN	657,218	0	8.1%
5.	(United States) Harry Reid International Airport	Paradise, Nevada, United States	LAS/KLAS	611,806	0	5.3%
6.	(United States) Los Angeles International Airport	Los Angeles, California, United States	LAX/KLAX	575,097	0	3.3%
7.	(United States) Charlotte Douglas International Airport	Charlotte, North Carolina, United States	CLT/KCLT	539,066	0	6.6%
8.	(Turkey) Istanbul Airport	Istanbul, Turkey	IST/LTFM	505,968	2	18.8%
9.	(United States) John F. Kennedy International Airport	Queens, New York City, New York, United States	JFK/KJFK	481,075	0	7.2%
10.	(Japan) Tokyo Haneda Airport	Ōta, Tokyo, Japan	HND/RJTT	464,910	8	19.8%

== 2022 statistics ==
Airports Council International's preliminary full-year figures are as follows:

Rank	Airport	Location	Code	Total Movements	Rank Change	Change
1.	(United States) Hartsfield-Jackson Atlanta International Airport	Atlanta, Georgia, United States	ATL/KATL	724,145	0	2.3%
2.	(United States) O'Hare International Airport	Chicago, Illinois, United States	ORD/KORD	711,561	0	4%
3.	(United States) Dallas/Fort Worth International Airport	Coppell, Euless, Grapevine, and Irving, Texas, United States	DFW/KDFW	656,676	0	0.7%
4.	(United States) Denver International Airport	Denver, Colorado, United States	DEN/KDEN	607,786	0	4.6%
5.	(United States) Harry Reid International Airport	Paradise, Nevada, United States	LAS/KLAS	581,116	2	19.4%
6.	(United States) Los Angeles International Airport	Los Angeles, California, United States	LAX/KLAX	556,913	Steady	9.9%
7.	(United States) Charlotte Douglas International Airport	Charlotte, North Carolina, United States	CLT/KCLT	505,589	2	2.8%
8.	(United States) Miami International Airport	Miami-Dade County, Florida, United States	MIA/KMIA	458,478	1	18.2%
9.	(United States) John F. Kennedy International Airport	Queens, New York City, New York, United States	JFK/KJFK	448,847	18	54.4%
10.	(Turkey) Istanbul Airport	Istanbul, Turkey	IST/LTFM	425,890	23	52%

== 2021 statistics ==
Airports Council International's final full-year figures are as follows:

Rank	Airport	Location	Code	Total Movements	Rank Change	Change
1.	(United States) Hartsfield-Jackson Atlanta International Airport	Atlanta, Georgia, United States	ATL/KATL	707,661	0	29.1%
2.	(United States) O'Hare International Airport	Chicago, Illinois, United States	ORD/KORD	684,201	0	27.1%
3.	(United States) Dallas/Fort Worth International Airport	Coppell, Euless, Grapevine, and Irving, Texas, United States	DFW/KDFW	651,895	0	26.7%
4.	(United States) Denver International Airport	Denver, Colorado, United States	DEN/KDEN	580,866	0	32.9%
5.	(United States) Charlotte Douglas International Airport	Charlotte, North Carolina, United States	CLT/KCLT	519,895	1	30.6%
6.	(United States) Los Angeles International Airport	Los Angeles, California, United States	LAX/KLAX	506,769	1	33.6%
7.	(United States) Harry Reid International Airport	Paradise, Nevada, United States	LAS/KLAS	486,540	3	50.4%
8.	(United States) Phoenix Sky Harbor International Airport	Phoenix, Arizona, United States	PHX/KPHX	408,285	5	31.6%
9.	(United States) Miami International Airport	Miami-Dade County, Florida, United States	MIA/KMIA	387,973	15	54.4%
10.	(United States) George Bush Intercontinental Airport	Houston, Texas, United States	IAH/KIAH	378,562	11	41.4%

== 2020 statistics ==
Airports Council International's final full-year figures are as follows:

Rank	Airport	Location	Code	Total Movements	Rank Change	Change
1.	(United States) Hartsfield-Jackson Atlanta International Airport	Atlanta, Georgia, United States	ATL/KATL	548,016	▲1	39.4%
2.	(United States) O'Hare International Airport	Chicago, Illinois, United States	ORD/KORD	538,211	▼1	41.5%
3.	(United States) Dallas/Fort Worth International Airport	Coppell, Euless, Grapevine, and Irving, Texas, United States	DFW/KDFW	514,702	Steady	28.5%
4.	(United States) Denver International Airport	Denver, Colorado, United States	DEN/KDEN	436,971	▲1	30.9%
5.	(United States) Phoenix Deer Valley Airport	Phoenix, Arizona, United States	DVT/KDVT	402,444	▲15	11.9%
6.	(United States) Charlotte Douglas International Airport	Charlotte, North Carolina, United States	CLT/KCLT	397,983	▲1	31.2%
7.	(United States) Los Angeles International Airport	Los Angeles, California, United States	LAX/KLAX	379,364	▼3	45.1%
8.	(China) Guangzhou Baiyun International Airport	Guangzhou, Guangdong, China	CAN/ZGGG	373,421	▲4	24.0%
9.	(China) Shanghai Pudong International Airport	Pudong, Shanghai, China	PVG/ZSPD	325,678	▲2	36.4%
10.	(United States) McCarran International Airport	Paradise, Nevada, United States	LAS/KLAS	323,422	▼2	41.5%

== 2019 statistics ==
Airports Council International's preliminary full-year figures are as follows:

Rank	Airport	Location	Code	Total Movements	Rank Change	Change
1.	(United States) O'Hare International Airport	Chicago, Illinois, United States	ORD/KORD	919,704	Steady	▲1.8%
2.	(United States) Hartsfield-Jackson Atlanta International Airport	Atlanta, Georgia, United States	ATL/KATL	904,301	Steady	▲1.0%
3.	(United States) Dallas/Fort Worth International Airport	Coppell, Euless, Grapevine, and Irving, Texas, United States	DFW/KDFW	720,007	▲1	▲7.9%
4.	(United States) Los Angeles International Airport	Los Angeles, California, United States	LAX/KLAX	691,257	▼1	▼2.3%
5.	(United States) Denver International Airport	Denver, Colorado, United States	DEN/KDEN	631,955	▲1	▲6.1%
6.	(China) Beijing Capital International Airport	Chaoyang–Shunyi, Beijing, China	PEK/ZBAA	594,329	▼1	▼3.2%
7.	(United States) Charlotte Douglas International Airport	Charlotte, North Carolina, United States	CLT/KCLT	578,263	Steady	▲5.1%
8.	(United States) McCarran International Airport	Las Vegas, Nevada, United States	LAS/KLAS	552,962	Steady	2.4%
9.	(Netherlands) Amsterdam Airport Schiphol	Haarlemmermeer, North Holland, Netherlands	AMS/EHAM	515,811	Steady	▼0.4%
10.	(Germany) Frankfurt Airport	Frankfurt, Hesse, Germany	FRA/EDDF	513,912	Steady	▲0.4%
11.	(China) Shanghai Pudong International Airport	Pudong, Shanghai, China	PVG/ZSPD	511,846	Steady	▲1.4%
12.	(China) Guangzhou Baiyun International Airport	Guangzhou, Guangdong, China	CAN/ZGGG	491,249	▲3	▲2.9%
13.	(France) Charles de Gaulle Airport	Paris, France	CDG/LFPG	482,676	▼1	▼1.1%
14.	(United States) George Bush Intercontinental Airport	Houston, Texas, United States	IAH/KIAH	478,070	▲4	▲2.4%
15.	(United Kingdom) London Heathrow Airport	London, England, United Kingdom	LHR/EGLL	478,002	▼1	▲0.1%
16.	(India) Indira Gandhi International Airport	Palam, Delhi, India	DEL/VIDP	466,452	▼3	▼3.0%
17.	Mexico City International Airport	Venustiano Carranza, Mexico City, Mexico	MEX/MMMX	459,987	▲4	▲0.3%
18.	(United States) San Francisco International Airport	San Mateo County, California, United States	SFO/KSFO	458,496	▼1	▼2.5%
19.	(Japan) Tokyo International Airport	Ōta, Tokyo, Japan	HND/RJTT	458,368	▲4	▲1.1%
20.	(United States) Phoenix Deer Valley Airport	Phoenix, Arizona, United States	DVT/KDVT	456,790	▲10	▲10.0%

== 2018 statistics ==
Airports Council International's final full-year figures are as follows:

Rank	Airport	Location	Code	Total Movements	Rank Change	Change
1.	(United States) O'Hare International Airport	Chicago, Illinois, United States	ORD/KORD	903,747	▲1	▲4.2%
2.	(United States) Hartsfield-Jackson Atlanta International Airport	Atlanta, Georgia, United States	ATL/KATL	895,682	▼1	▲1.8%
3.	(United States) Los Angeles International Airport	Los Angeles, California, United States	LAX/KLAX	707,833	Steady	▲1.1%
4.	(United States) Dallas/Fort Worth International Airport	Coppell, Euless, Grapevine, and Irving, Texas, United States	DFW/KDFW	667,213	Steady	▲2.0%
5.	(China) Beijing Capital International Airport	Chaoyang–Shunyi, Beijing, China	PEK/ZBAA	614,022	Steady	▲2.8%
6.	(United States) Denver International Airport	Denver, Colorado, United States	DEN/KDEN	595,190	Steady	▲3.5%
7.	(United States) Charlotte Douglas International Airport	Charlotte, North Carolina, United States	CLT/KCLT	550,013	Steady	▲0.4%
8.	(United States) McCarran International Airport	Las Vegas, Nevada, United States	LAS/KLAS	539,857	Steady	▼0.6%
9.	(Netherlands) Amsterdam Airport Schiphol	Haarlemmermeer, North Holland, Netherlands	AMS/EHAM	517,737	Steady	▲0.7%
10.	(Germany) Frankfurt Airport	Frankfurt, Hesse, Germany	FRA/EDDF	512,115	▲3	▲7.7%
11.	(China) Shanghai Pudong International Airport	Pudong, Shanghai, China	PVG/ZSPD	504,794	▼1	▲1.6%
12.	(France) Charles de Gaulle Airport	Paris, France	CDG/LFPG	488,092	▼1	▲1.1%
13.	(India) Indira Gandhi International Airport	Palam, Delhi, India	DEL/VIDP	480,707	▲8	▲7.3%
14.	(United Kingdom) London Heathrow Airport	London, England, United Kingdom	LHR/EGLL	477,769	▼2	▲0.4%
15.	(China) Guangzhou Baiyun International Airport	Guangzhou, Guangdong, China	CAN/ZGGG	477,364	Steady	▲2.6%
16.	(Canada) Toronto Pearson International Airport	Mississauga, Ontario, Canada	YYZ/CYYZ	474,289	▼2	▲1.9%
17.	(United States) San Francisco International Airport	San Mateo County, California, United States	SFO/KSFO	470,164	Steady	▲2.1%
18.	(United States) George Bush Intercontinental Airport	Houston, Texas, United States	IAH/KIAH	466,738	▲1	▲3.6%
19.	(Turkey) Atatürk International Airport	Istanbul, Turkey	IST/LTBA	464,646	▼3	▲0.8%
20.	(Indonesia) Soekarno-Hatta International Airport	Cengkareng, Tangerang, Banten, Indonesia	CGK/WIII	463,069	▲2	▲3.5%

== 2017 statistics ==
Airports Council International's final full-year figures are as follows:

Rank	Airport	Location	Code	Total Movements	Rank Change	Change
1.	(United States) Hartsfield-Jackson Atlanta International Airport	Atlanta, Georgia, United States	ATL/KATL	879,560	0	2.1%
2.	(United States) O'Hare International Airport	Chicago, Illinois, United States	ORD/KORD	867,049	0	0.1%
3.	(United States) Los Angeles International Airport	Los Angeles, California, United States	LAX/KLAX	700,362	0	0.5%
4.	(United States) Dallas/Fort Worth International Airport	Coppell, Euless, Grapevine, and Irving, Texas, United States	DFW/KDFW	654,344	0	2.7%
5.	(China) Beijing Capital International Airport	Chaoyang–Shunyi, Beijing, China	PEK/ZBAA	597,259	0	1.5%
6.	(United States) Denver International Airport	Denver, Colorado, United States	DEN/KDEN	574,966	0	1.7%
7.	(United States) Charlotte Douglas International Airport	Charlotte, North Carolina, United States	CLT/KCLT	553,817	0	1.5%
8.	(United States) McCarran International Airport	Paradise, Nevada, United States	LAS/KLAS	542,994	0	0.3%
9.	(Netherlands) Amsterdam Airport Schiphol	Haarlemmermeer, North Holland, Netherlands	AMS/EHAM	514,625	0	3.6%
10.	(China) Shanghai Pudong International Airport	Pudong, Shanghai, China	PVG/ZSPD	496,774	0	3.5%
11.	(France) Charles de Gaulle Airport	Paris, France	CDG/LFPG	482,676	0	0.7%
12.	(United Kingdom) London Heathrow Airport	London, England, United Kingdom	LHR/EGLL	475,915	0	0.2%
13.	(Germany) Frankfurt Airport	Frankfurt, Hesse, Germany	FRA/EDDF	475,537	2	2.7%

== 2016 statistics ==
Airports Council International's full-year figures are as follows:

Rank	Airport	Location	Code	Total Movements	Rank Change	Change
1.	(United States) Hartsfield-Jackson Atlanta International Airport	Atlanta, Georgia, United States	ATL/KATL	898,356	0	1.8%
2.	(United States) O'Hare International Airport	Chicago, Illinois, United States	ORD/KORD	867,365	0	0.9%
3.	(United States) Los Angeles International Airport	Los Angeles, California, United States	LAX/KLAX	697,138	1	6.3%
4.	(United States) Dallas/Fort Worth International Airport	Coppell, Euless, Grapevine, and Irving, Texas, United States	DFW/KDFW	672,748	1	1.3%
5.	(China) Beijing Capital International Airport	Chaoyang–Shunyi, Beijing, China	PEK/ZBAA	606,686	0	2.7%
6.	(United States) Denver International Airport	Denver, Colorado, United States	DEN/KDEN	565,503	0	4.5%
7.	(United States) Charlotte Douglas International Airport	Charlotte, North Carolina, United States	CLT/KCLT	545,742	0	0.3%
8.	(United States) Las Vegas McCarran International Airport	Las Vegas, Nevada, United States	LAS/KLAS	541,428	0	2.1%
9.	(Netherlands) Amsterdam Airport Schiphol	Haarlemmermeer, North Holland, Netherlands	AMS/EHAM	496,256	4	6.6%
10.	(China) Shanghai Pudong International Airport	Pudong, Shanghai, China	PVG/ZSPD	479,902	5	6.8%
11.	(France) Charles de Gaulle Airport	Paris, France	CDG/LFPG	479,199	1	0.7%
12.	(United Kingdom) London Heathrow Airport	London, England, United Kingdom	LHR/EGLL	474,983	1	0.2%
13.	(Canada) Toronto Pearson International Airport	Mississauga, Ontario, Canada	YYZ/CYYZ	456,536	3	2.8%

== 2015 statistics ==
Airports Council International's full-year figures are as follows:

Rank	Airport	Location	Code	Total Movements	Rank Change	Change
1.	(United States) Hartsfield-Jackson Atlanta International Airport	Atlanta, Georgia, United States	ATL/KATL	882,497	1	1.6%
2.	(United States) O'Hare International Airport	Chicago, Illinois, United States	ORD/KORD	875,136	1	0.8%
3.	(United States) Dallas/Fort Worth International Airport	Coppell, Euless, Grapevine, and Irving, Texas, United States	DFW/KDFW	681,244	0	0.2%
4.	(United States) Los Angeles International Airport	Los Angeles, California, United States	LAX/KLAX	655,564	0	3.0%
5.	(China) Beijing Capital International Airport	Chaoyang–Shunyi, Beijing, China	PEK/ZBAA	590,169	0	1.4%
6.	(United States) Denver International Airport	Denver, Colorado, United States	DEN/KDEN	541,213	0	4.3%
7.	(United States) Charlotte Douglas International Airport	Charlotte, North Carolina, United States	CLT/KCLT	540,944	0	0.8%
8.	(United States) McCarran International Airport	Las Vegas, Nevada, United States	LAS/KLAS	522,399	0	0.3%
9.	(United States) George Bush Intercontinental Airport	Houston, Texas, United States	IAH/KIAH	502,844	0	1.2%
10.	(France) Charles de Gaulle Airport	Paris, France	CDG/LFPG	475,776	1	0.9%
11.	(United Kingdom) London Heathrow Airport	London, England, United Kingdom	LHR/EGLL	474,102	1	0.3%
12.	(Germany) Frankfurt Airport	Frankfurt, Hesse, Germany	FRA/EDDF	468,153	0	0.2%
13.	(Netherlands) Amsterdam Airport Schiphol	Haarlemmermeer, North Holland, Netherlands	AMS/EHAM	465,521	0	2.8%
14.	(Turkey) Atatürk International Airport	Istanbul, Turkey	IST/LTBA	464,865	0	5.8%
15.	(China) Shanghai Pudong International Airport	Pudong, Shanghai, China	PVG/ZSPD	448,213	0	11.5%
16.	(Canada) Toronto Pearson International Airport	Mississauga, Ontario, Canada	YYZ/CYYZ	443,773	1	2.4%
17.	(United States) Phoenix Sky Harbor International Airport	Phoenix, Arizona, United States	PHX/KPHX	439,035	0	2.0%
18.	(Japan) Tokyo International Airport	Ōta, Tokyo, Japan	HND/RJTT	438,542	0	3.0%
19.	(United States) John F. Kennedy International Airport	Queens, New York City, New York, United States	JFK/KJFK	438,448	0	3.6%
20.	(United States) San Francisco International Airport	San Mateo County, California, United States	SFO/KSFO	429,815	4	0.4%
21.	(United Arab Emirates) Dubai International Airport	Dubai, United Arab Emirates	DXB/OMDB	418,220	4	13.8%
22.	Mexico City International Airport	Venustiano Carranza, Mexico City, Mexico	MEX/MMMX	426,761	2	4.1%
23.	Hong Kong International Airport	Chek Lap Kok, Islands, New Territories, Hong Kong	HKG/VHHH	416,900	4	5.0%
24.	(United States) Newark Liberty International Airport	Newark, New Jersey, United States	EWR/KEWR	414,525	4	4.6%
25.	(United States) Miami International Airport	Miami-Dade County, Florida, United States	MIA/KMIA	412,955	0	2.5%
26.	(United States) Philadelphia International Airport	Philadelphia, Pennsylvania, United States	PHL/KPHL	411,368	3	1.9%
27.	(China) Guangzhou Baiyun International Airport	Baiyun–Huadu, Guangzhou, Guangdong, China	CAN/ZGGG	409,674	5	0.6%
28.	(United States) Minneapolis–Saint Paul International Airport	Hennepin County, Minnesota, United States	MSP/KMSP	403,151	6	2.2%
29.	(United States) Seattle–Tacoma International Airport	SeaTac, Washington, United States	SEA/KSEA	381,408	?	12.0%
30.	(Indonesia) Soekarno-Hatta International Airport	Cengkareng, Tangerang, Banten, Indonesia	CGK/WIII	380,129	1	1.8%

== 2014 statistics ==
Airports Council International's full-year figures are as follows:

Rank	Airport	Location	Code (IATA/ICAO)	Total Movements	Rank Change	Change
1.	(United States) O'Hare International Airport	Chicago, Illinois, United States	ORD/KORD	881,933	1	0.2%
2.	(United States) Hartsfield-Jackson Atlanta International Airport	Atlanta, Georgia, United States	ATL/KATL	868,359	1	4.7%
3.	(United States) Dallas/Fort Worth International Airport	Coppell, Euless, Grapevine, and Irving, Texas, United States	DFW/KDFW	679,820	0	0.3%
4.	(United States) Los Angeles International Airport	Los Angeles, California, United States	LAX/KLAX	636,706	0	3.5%
5.	(China) Beijing Capital International Airport	Chaoyang–Shunyi, Beijing, China	PEK/ZBAA	581,773	1	2.5%
6.	(United States) Denver International Airport	Denver, Colorado, United States	DEN/KDEN	565,525	1	2.9%
7.	(United States) Charlotte Douglas International Airport	Charlotte, North Carolina, United States	CLT/KCLT	545,178	0	2.3%
8.	(United States) McCarran International Airport	Las Vegas, Nevada, United States	LAS/KLAS	522,399	0	0.3%
9.	(United States) George Bush Intercontinental Airport	Houston, Texas, United States	IAH/KIAH	508,935	0	0.5%
10.	(United Kingdom) London Heathrow Airport	London, England, United Kingdom	LHR/EGLL	472,817	2	0.2%
11.	(France) Charles de Gaulle Airport	Paris, France	CDG/LFPG	471,318	1	1.5%
12.	(Germany) Frankfurt Airport	Frankfurt, Hesse, Germany	FRA/EDDF	469,026	1	0.8%
13.	(Netherlands) Amsterdam Airport Schiphol	Haarlemmermeer, North Holland, Netherlands	AMS/EHAM	452,687	1	2.9%
14.	(Turkey) Atatürk International Airport	Istanbul, Turkey	IST/LTBA	439,549	7	8.2%
15.	(Canada) Toronto Pearson International Airport	Mississauga, Ontario, Canada	YYZ/CYYZ	434,846	2	0.8%
16.	(United States) San Francisco International Airport	San Mateo County, California, United States	SFO/KSFO	431,633	3	2.4%
17.	(United States) Phoenix Sky Harbor International Airport	Phoenix, Arizona, United States	PHX/KPHX	430,461	4	1.2%
18.	(Japan) Tokyo International Airport	Ōta, Tokyo, Japan	HND/RJTT	425,604	5	5.6%
19.	(United States) John F. Kennedy International Airport	Queens, New York City, New York, United States	JFK/KJFK	422,912	3	4.2%
20.	(United States) Philadelphia International Airport	Philadelphia, Pennsylvania, United States	PHL/KPHL	419,253	5	3.2%
21.	(China) Guangzhou Baiyun International Airport	Baiyun–Huadu, Guangzhou, Guangdong, China	CAN/ZGGG	412,210	6	5.1%
22.	(United States) Minneapolis–Saint Paul International Airport	Minneapolis, Minnesota, United States	MSP/KMSP	412,049	6	4.8%
23.	Mexico City International Airport	Venustiano Carranza, Mexico City, Mexico	MEX/MMMX	409,954	3	3.5%
24.	(United States) Miami International Airport	Miami-Dade County, Florida, United States	MIA/KMIA	402,973	0	1.0%
25.	(China) Shanghai Pudong International Airport	Pudong, Shanghai, China	PVG/ZSPD	402,105	?	8.3%
26.	Hong Kong International Airport	Chek Lap Kok, Islands, New Territories, Hong Kong	HKG/VHHH	401,861	2	5.0%
27.	(United States) Newark Liberty International Airport	Newark, New Jersey, United States	EWR/KEWR	398,630	7	3.7%
28.	(United States) Detroit Metropolitan Wayne County Airport	Romulus, Michigan, United States	DTW/KDTW	392,655	10	7.8%
29.	(Indonesia) Soekarno-Hatta International Airport	Cengkareng, Tangerang, Banten, Indonesia	CGK/WIII	382,287	4	3.6%
30.	(Germany) Munich Airport	Freising, Bavaria, Germany	MUC/EDDM	376,768	1	1.4%

== 2013 final statistics ==
Rank	Airport	Location	Code (IATA/ICAO)	Total movements	Rank Change	Change
1.	(United States) Hartsfield-Jackson Atlanta International Airport	Atlanta, Georgia, United States	ATL/KATL	911,074	0	2.1%
2.	(United States) O'Hare International Airport	Chicago, Illinois, United States	ORD/KORD	883,287	0	0.6%
3.	(United States) Dallas/Fort Worth International Airport	Coppell, Euless, Grapevine, and Irving, Texas, United States	DFW/KDFW	678,059	0	4.3%
4.	(United States) Los Angeles International Airport	Los Angeles, California, United States	LAX/KLAX	614,917	1	1.6%
5.	(United States) Denver International Airport	Denver, Colorado, United States	DEN/KDEN	582,653	1	4.9%
6.	(China) Beijing Capital International Airport	Chaoyang–Shunyi, Beijing, China	PEK/ZBAA	567,759	0	1.9%
7.	(United States) Charlotte/Douglas International Airport	Charlotte, North Carolina, United States	CLT/KCLT	557,948	0	1.1%
8.	(United States) McCarran International Airport	Las Vegas, Nevada, United States	LAS/KLAS	520,992	0	1.3%
9.	(United States) George Bush Intercontinental Airport	Houston, Texas, United States	IAH/KIAH	496,908	0	1.2%
10.	(France) Paris-Charles de Gaulle Airport	Seine-et-Marne, Seine-Saint-Denis, Val-d'Oise, Île-de-France, France	CDG/LFPG	478,306	0	3.9%
11.	(Germany) Frankfurt Airport	Frankfurt, Hesse, Germany	FRA/EDDF	472,692	0	2.0%
12.	(United Kingdom) London Heathrow Airport	London, United Kingdom	LHR/EGLL	471,938	0	0.7%
13.	(United States) Phoenix Sky Harbor International Airport	Phoenix, Arizona, United States	PHX/KPHX	459,434	0	0.3%
14.	(Netherlands) Amsterdam Airport Schiphol	Haarlemmermeer, Netherlands	AMS/EHAM	440,057	1	0.5%
15.	(United States) Philadelphia International Airport	Philadelphia, Pennsylvania, United States	PHL/KPHL	432,884	1	2.3%
16.	(United States) Minneapolis–Saint Paul International Airport	Minneapolis, Minnesota, United States	MSP/KMSP	431,328	2	1.4%
17.	(Canada) Toronto Pearson International Airport	Toronto, Ontario, Canada	YYZ/CYYZ	431,323	1	0.6%
18.	(United States) Detroit Metropolitan Wayne County Airport	Detroit, Michigan, United States	DTW/KDTW	425,732	1	0.5%
19.	(United States) San Francisco International Airport	San Mateo County, California, United States	SFO/KSFO	421,400	0	0.8%
20.	(United States) Newark Liberty International Airport	Newark, New Jersey, United States	EWR/KEWR	413,581	0	0.1%
21.	(Turkey) Istanbul Atatürk Airport	Istanbul, Turkey	IST/LTBA	406,482	9	11.6%
22.	(United States) John F. Kennedy International Airport	New York City, New York, United States	JFK/KJFK	406,419	1	1.2%
23.	(Japan) Tokyo International Airport	Ōta, Tokyo, Japan	HND/RJTT	403,242	?	3.1%
24.	(United States) Miami International Airport	Miami-Dade County, Florida, United States	MIA/KMIA	399,140	1	2.0%
25.	(Indonesia) Soekarno-Hatta International Airport	Cengkareng, Banten, Indonesia	CGK/WIII	398,985	3	4.7%
26.	Mexico City International Airport	Mexico City, Mexico	MEX/MMMX	396,567	2	5.0%
27.	(China) Guangzhou Baiyun International Airport	Baiyun–Huadu, Guangzhou, Guangdong, China	CAN/ZGGG	394,403	1	5.7%
28.	Hong Kong International Airport	Chek Lap Kok, Islands, New Territories, Hong Kong	HKG/VHHH	382,782	?	5.7%
29.	(Germany) Munich Airport	Munich, Germany	MUC/EDDM	381,951	?	4.0%
30.	(United States) LaGuardia Airport	New York City, New York, United States	LGA/KLGA	374,658	3	1.3%

== 2012 final statistics ==
Rank	Airport	Location	Code (IATA/ICAO)	Total movements	Rank Change	Change
1.	(United States) Hartsfield-Jackson Atlanta International Airport	Atlanta, Georgia, United States	ATL/KATL	930,250	0	0.7%
2.	(United States) O'Hare International Airport	Chicago, Illinois, United States	ORD/KORD	878,108	0	0.3%
3.	(United States) Dallas/Fort Worth International Airport	Coppell, Euless, Grapevine, and Irving, Texas, United States	DFW/KDFW	650,124	1	0.5%
4.	(United States) Denver International Airport	Denver, Colorado, United States	DEN/KDEN	612,557	1	2.6%
5.	(United States) Los Angeles International Airport	Los Angeles, California, United States	LAX/KLAX	605,480	2	0.3%
6.	(China) Beijing Capital International Airport	Chaoyang–Shunyi, Beijing, China	PEK/ZBAA	557,167	1	4.5%
7.	(United States) Charlotte/Douglas International Airport	Charlotte, North Carolina, United States	CLT/KCLT	552,093	1	2.3%
8.	(United States) McCarran International Airport	Las Vegas, Nevada, United States	LAS/KLAS	527,739	0	0.7%
9.	(United States) George Bush Intercontinental Airport	Houston, Texas, United States	IAH/KIAH	510,242	0	3.5%
10.	(France) Paris-Charles de Gaulle Airport	Seine-et-Marne, Seine-Saint-Denis, Val-d'Oise, Île-de-France, France	CDG/LFPG	497,763	0	3.2%
11.	(Germany) Frankfurt Airport	Frankfurt, Hesse, Germany	FRA/EDDF	482,242	0	1.0%
12.	(United Kingdom) London Heathrow Airport	London, United Kingdom	LHR/EGLL	475,180	0	1.2%
13.	(United States) Phoenix Sky Harbor International Airport	Phoenix, Arizona, Arizona, United States	PHX/KPHX	450,204	2	2.6%
14.	(United States) Philadelphia International Airport	Philadelphia, Pennsylvania, United States	PHL/KPHL	443,236	2	1.1%
15.	(Netherlands) Amsterdam Airport Schiphol	Haarlemmermeer, Netherlands	AMS/EHAM	437,640	1	0.1%
16.	(Canada) Toronto Pearson International Airport	Toronto, Ontario, Canada	YYZ/CYYZ	433,990	3	1.3%
17.	(United States) Detroit Metropolitan Wayne County Airport	Detroit, Michigan, United States	DTW/KDTW	427,814	2	3.4%
18.	(United States) Minneapolis–Saint Paul International Airport	Minneapolis, Minnesota, United States	MSP/KMSP	426,818	1	1.7%
19.	(United States) San Francisco International Airport	San Mateo County, California, United States	SFO/KSFO	424,566	4	5.2%
20.	(United States) Newark Liberty International Airport	Newark, New Jersey, US	EWR/KEWR	414,495	1	1.1%
21.	(United States) John F. Kennedy International Airport	New York City, New York, United States	JFK/KJFK	401,950	1	1.7%
22.	(Germany) Munich Airport	Munich, Germany	MUC/EDDM	398,039	1	2.9%
23.	(United States) Miami International Airport	Miami-Dade County, Florida, United States	MIA/KMIA	391,195	1	0.9%
24.	Mexico City International Airport	Mexico City, Mexico	MEX/MMMX	376,286	5	7.5%
25.	(Spain) Adolfo Suarez Madrid-Barajas Airport	Madrid, Spain	MAD/LEMD	373,185	7	13.1%
26.	(China) Guangzhou Baiyun International Airport	Baiyun–Huadu, Guangzhou, Guangdong, China	CAN/ZGGG	371,515	4	6.4%
27.	(United States) LaGuardia Airport	New York City, New York, United States	LGA/KLGA	370,050	0	1.4%
28.	(Indonesia) Soekarno-Hatta International Airport	Cengkareng, Banten, Indonesia	CGK/WIII	369,740	?	7.7%
29.	(United States) Phoenix Deer Valley Airport	Phoenix, Arizona, United States	DVT/KDVT	365,432	?	15.1%
30.	(Turkey) Istanbul Atatürk Airport	Istanbul, Turkey	IST/LTBA	364,317	?	12.0%

== 2011 final statistics ==
Rank	Airport	Location	Code (IATA/ICAO)	Total movements	Rank Change	Change
1.	(United States) Hartsfield–Jackson Atlanta International Airport	ATLANTA GA, US	ATL/KATL	923,996	0	2.7%
2.	(United States) O'Hare International Airport	CHICAGO IL, US	ORD/KORD	878,798	0	0.4%
3.	(United States) Los Angeles International Airport	LOS ANGELES CA, US	LAX/KLAX	702,895	0	5.4%
4.	(United States) Dallas/Fort Worth International Airport	Coppell, Euless, Grapevine, and Irving, Texas, United States	DFW/KDFW	646,803	0	0.8%
5.	(United States) Denver International Airport	DENVER CO, US	DEN/KDEN	628,796	0	0.2%
6.	(United States) Charlotte/Douglas International Airport	CHARLOTTE NC, US	CLT/KCLT	539,842	1	2.0%
7.	(China) Beijing Capital International Airport	Chaoyang–Shunyi, Beijing, China	PEK/ZBAA	533,257	1	3.0%
8.	(United States) McCarran International Airport	Las Vegas, Nevada, United States	LAS/KLAS	531,538	1	5.1%
9.	(United States) George Bush Intercontinental Airport	HOUSTON TX, US	IAH/KIAH	517,262	3	2.7%
10.	(France) Paris-Charles de Gaulle Airport	Seine-et-Marne, Seine-Saint-Denis, Val-d'Oise, Île-de-France, France	CDG/LFPG	514,059	0	2.8%
11.	(Germany) Frankfurt Airport	Frankfurt, Hesse, Germany	FRA/EDDF	487,162	0	4.9%
12.	(United Kingdom) London Heathrow Airport	LONDON, GB	LHR/EGLL	480,931	1	5.7%
13.	(United States) Phoenix Sky Harbor International Airport	PHOENIX AZ, US	PHX/KPHX	461,989	2	2.8%
14.	(United States) Philadelphia International Airport	PHILADELPHIA PA, US	PHL/KPHL	448,129	2	2.7%
15.	(United States) Detroit Metropolitan Wayne County Airport	DETROIT MI, US	DTW/KDTW	443,028	1	2.1%
16.	(Netherlands) Amsterdam Airport Schiphol	Haarlemmermeer, Netherlands	AMS/EHAM	437,083	4	8.6%
17.	(United States) Minneapolis–Saint Paul International Airport	MINNEAPOLIS MN, US	MSP/KMSP	436,506	1	0%
18.	(Spain) Barajas Airport	MADRID, ES	MAD/LEMD	429,390	1	1.0%
19.	(Canada) Toronto Pearson International Airport	TORONTO ON, CA	YYZ/CYYZ	428,764	1	2.5%
20.	(United States) Newark Liberty International Airport	NEWARK NJ, US	EWR/KEWR	410,024	1	2.9%
21.	(Germany) Munich Airport	MUNICH, DE	MUC/EDDM	409,956	1	5.1%
22.	(United States) John F. Kennedy International Airport	NEW YORK NY, US	JFK/KJFK	408,730	1	2.5%
23.	(United States) San Francisco International Airport	San Mateo County, California, United States	SFO/KSFO	403,564	0	4.2%
24.	(United States) Miami International Airport	Miami-Dade County, Florida, United States	MIA/KMIA	394,572	0	4.9%
25.	(Japan) Tokyo International Airport	Ōta, Tokyo, Japan	HND/RJTT	379,670	4	10.8%
26.	(United States) Logan International Airport	BOSTON MA, US	BOS/KBOS	368,987	2	4.6%
27.	(United States) LaGuardia Airport	NEW YORK NY, US	LGA/KLGA	366,597	0	1.2%
28.	(United States) Salt Lake City International Airport	SALT LAKE CITY UT, US	SLC/KSLC	358,002	2	1.3%
29.	Mexico City International Airport	MEXICO CITY, MX	MEX/MMMX	350,032	1	3.0%
30.	(China) Guangzhou Baiyun International Airport	Baiyun–Huadu, Guangzhou, Guangdong, China	CAN/ZGGG	349,259	–	6.1%

== 2010 final statistics ==
Rank	Airport	Location	Code (IATA/ICAO)	Total movements	Rank Change	Change
1.	(United States) Hartsfield–Jackson Atlanta International Airport	Atlanta, Georgia, United States	ATL/KATL	950,119	0	2.1%
2.	(United States) O'Hare International Airport	Chicago, Illinois, United States	ORD/KORD	882,617	0	6.6%
3.	(United States) Los Angeles International Airport	Los Angeles, California, United States	LAX/KLAX	666,938	1	5.1%
4.	(United States) Dallas/Fort Worth International Airport	Coppell, Euless, Grapevine, and Irving, Texas, United States	DFW/KDFW	652,261	1	2.1%
5.	(United States) Denver International Airport	Denver, Colorado, United States	DEN/KDEN	630,063	0	3.8%
6.	(United States) George Bush Intercontinental Airport	Houston, Texas, United States	IAH/KIAH	531,347	0	1.3%
7.	(United States) Charlotte/Douglas International Airport	Charlotte, North Carolina, United States	CLT/KCLT	529,101	2	3.9%
8.	(China) Beijing Capital International Airport	Chaoyang–Shunyi, Beijing, China	PEK/ZBAA	517,584	2	6.0%
9.	(United States) McCarran International Airport	Paradise, Nevada, United States	LAS/KLAS	505,591	1	1.1%
10.	(France) Paris-Charles de Gaulle Airport	Seine-et-Marne, Seine-Saint-Denis, Val-d'Oise, Île-de-France, France	CDG/LFPG	499,997	3	4.8%
11.	(Germany) Frankfurt Airport	Frankfurt, Hesse, Germany	FRA/EDDF	464,432	2	0.3%
12.	(United States) Philadelphia International Airport	Eastwick, Philadelphia, Pennsylvania, United States	PHL/KPHL	460,779	1	2.5%
13.	(United Kingdom) London Heathrow Airport	Hayes, Hillingdon, Greater London, United Kingdom	LHR/EGLL	454,883	1	2.5%
14.	(United States) Detroit Metropolitan Wayne County Airport	Romulus, Michigan, United States	DTW/KDTW	452,616	2	4.6%
15.	(United States) Phoenix Sky Harbor International Airport	Phoenix, Arizona, United States	PHX/KPHX	449,351	1	1.7%
16.	(United States) Minneapolis-Saint Paul International Airport	Fort Snelling, Minnesota, United States	MSP/KMSP	436,625	1	1.0%
17.	(Spain) Barajas Airport	Barajas, Madrid, Madrid, Spain	MAD/LEMD	433,683	2	0.4%
18.	(Canada) Toronto Pearson International Airport	Mississauga, Ontario, Canada	YYZ/CYYZ	418,298	2	2.6%
19.	(United States) Newark Liberty International Airport	Newark, Elizabeth, New Jersey, United States	EWR/KEWR	403,880	0	2.1%
20.	(Netherlands) Amsterdam Airport Schiphol	Haarlemmermeer, Netherlands	AMS/EHAM	402,372	1	1.1%
21.	(United States) John F. Kennedy International Airport	Queens, New York City, New York, United States	JFK/KJFK	399,626	3	4.2%
22.	(Germany) Munich Airport	Munich, Bavaria, Germany	MUC/EDDM	389,939	1	1.7%
23.	(United States) San Francisco International Airport	San Mateo County, California, United States	SFO/KSFO	387,248	1	2.0%
24.	(United States) Miami International Airport	Miami-Dade County, Florida, United States	MIA/KMIA	376,208	3	7.1%
25.	(United States) Phoenix Deer Valley Airport (Business airport)	Phoenix, Arizona, United States	DVT/KDVT	368,747	3	8.4%
26.	(United States) Salt Lake City International Airport	Salt Lake City, Utah, United States	SLC/KSLC	362,654	1	2.6%
27.	(United States) LaGuardia Airport	Queens, New York City, New York, United States	LGA/KLGA	362,137	1	2.0%
28.	(United States) Logan International Airport	Boston, Massachusetts, United States	BOS/KBOS	352,643	2	2.1%
29.	(Japan) Tokyo International Airport	Ōta, Tokyo, Japan	HND/RJTT	342,804	4	2.1%
30.	Mexico City International Airport	Mexico City, Greater Mexico City, Mexico	MEX/MMMX	339,898	1	2.4%

== 2009 final statistics ==
Rank	Airport	Location	Code (IATA/ICAO)	Total movements	Rank Change	Change
1.	(United States) Hartsfield–Jackson Atlanta International Airport	Atlanta, Georgia, United States	ATL/KATL	970,235	0	0.8%
2.	(United States) O'Hare International Airport	Chicago, Illinois, United States	ORD/KORD	827,899	0	6.1%
3.	(United States) Dallas/Fort Worth International Airport	Coppell, Euless, Grapevine, and Irving, Texas, United States	DFW/KDFW	638,782	0	2.7%
4.	(United States) Los Angeles International Airport	Los Angeles, California, United States	LAX/KLAX	634,383	0	1.9%
5.	(United States) Denver International Airport	Denver, Colorado, United States	DEN/KDEN	607,019	0	2.0%
6.	(United States) George Bush Intercontinental Airport	Houston, Texas, United States	IAH/KIAH	538,168	1	6.6%
7.	(France) Paris-Charles de Gaulle Airport	Seine-et-Marne, Seine-Saint-Denis, Val-d'Oise, Île-de-France, France	CDG/LFPG	525,314	1	7.2%
8.	(United States) McCarran International Airport	Paradise, Nevada, United States	LAS/KLAS	511,064	2	11.7%
9.	(United States) Charlotte/Douglas International Airport	Charlotte, North Carolina, United States	CLT/KCLT	509,448	0	5.0%
10.	(China) Beijing Capital International Airport	Chaoyang–Shunyi, Beijing, China	PEK/ZBAA	488,505	11	13.2%
11.	(United States) Philadelphia International Airport	Eastwick, Philadelphia, Pennsylvania, United States	PHL/KPHL	472,668	0	3.9%
12.	(United Kingdom) London Heathrow Airport	Hayes, Hillingdon, Greater London, United Kingdom	LHR/EGLL	466,393	1	2.6%
13.	(Germany) Frankfurt Airport	Frankfurt, Hesse, Germany	FRA/EDDF	463,111	1	4.7%
14.	(United States) Phoenix Sky Harbor International Airport	Phoenix, Arizona, United States	PHX/KPHX	457,207	4	9.0%
15.	(Spain) Barajas Airport	Barajas, Madrid, Madrid, Spain	MAD/LEMD	435,179	1	7.4%
16.	(United States) Detroit Metropolitan Wayne County Airport	Romulus, Michigan, United States	DTW/KDTW	432,589	1	6.5%
17.	(United States) Minneapolis-Saint Paul International Airport	Fort Snelling, Minnesota, United States	MSP/KMSP	432,395	1	3.9%
18.	(United States) John F. Kennedy International Airport	Queens, New York City, New York, United States	JFK/KJFK	416,945	0	5.5%
19.	(United States) Newark Liberty International Airport	Newark, Elizabeth, New Jersey, United States	EWR/KEWR	411,607	0	5.3%
20.	(Canada) Toronto Pearson International Airport	Mississauga, Ontario, Canada	YYZ/CYYZ	407,352	2	5.4%
21.	(Netherlands) Amsterdam Airport Schiphol	Haarlemmermeer, Netherlands	AMS/EHAM	406,974	4	8.9%
22.	(United States) Phoenix Deer Valley Airport (Business airport)	Phoenix, Arizona, United States	DVT/KDVT	402,335	5	6.9%
23.	(Germany) Munich Airport	Munich, Bavaria, Germany	MUC/EDDM	396,805	3	8.2%
24.	(United States) San Francisco International Airport	San Mateo County, California, United States	SFO/KSFO	379,751	0	2.1%
25.	(United States) Salt Lake City International Airport	Salt Lake City, Utah, United States	SLC/KSLC	372,300	2	4.4%
26.	(United States) LaGuardia Airport	Queens, New York City, New York, United States	LGA/KLGA	354,594	0	6.5%
27.	(United States) Miami International Airport	Miami-Dade County, Florida, United States	MIA/KMIA	351,417	2	7.5%
28.	(United States) Van Nuys Airport (Business airport)	Van Nuys, California, United States	VNY/KVNY	351,285	3	9.2%
29.	Mexico City International Airport	Mexico City, Greater Mexico City, Mexico	MEX/MMMX	348,306	1	5.0%
30.	(United States) Logan International Airport	Boston, Massachusetts, United States	BOS/KBOS	345,306	2	7.1%
31.	(United States) Washington Dulles International Airport	Dulles, Virginia, United States	IAD/KIAD	340,367	?	5.5%
32.	(United States) Memphis International Airport	Memphis, Tennessee, United States	MEM/KMEM	338,973	?	6.7%
33.	(Japan) Tokyo International Airport	Ōta, Tokyo, Japan	HND/RJTT	335,716	?	1.2%
34.	(Italy) Leonardo da Vinci Airport	Fiumicino, Rome, Italy	FCO/LIRF	324,497	?	6.4%
35.	(United States) Seattle-Tacoma International Airport	Seattle, Washington, United States	SEA/KSEA	317,873	?	7.9%
36.	(Canada) Vancouver International Airport	Richmond, British Columbia, Canada	YVR/CYVR	313,984	?	7.1%
37.	(China) Guangzhou Baiyun International Airport	Baiyun–Huadu, Guangzhou, Guangdong, China	CAN/ZGGG	308,863	?	10.2%
38.	(United States) Orlando International Airport	Orlando, Florida, United States	MCO/KMCO	300,401	?	10.3%
39.	(United States) Long Beach Airport	Long Beach, California, United States	LGB/KLGB	297,079	?	12.2%
40.	(Australia) Sydney Airport	Sydney, New South Wales, Australia	SYD/YSSY	289,847	?	3.6%
41.	Hong Kong International Airport	Chek Lap Kok, Islands, New Territories, Hong Kong	HKG/VHHH	288,169	?	6.9%
42.	(China) Shanghai Pudong International Airport	Pudong, Shanghai, China	PVG/ZSPD	287,916	?	8.4%
43.	(Turkey) Atatürk International Airport	Yesilköy, Istanbul, Turkey	IST/LTBA	283,953	?	2.8%
44.	(United Arab Emirates) Dubai International Airport	Garhoud, Dubai, United Arab Emirates	DXB/OMDB	281,175	?	4.0%
45.	(Spain) Barcelona Airport	Barcelona, Catalonia, Spain	BCN/LEBL	278,965	?	13.3%
46.	(United States) Honolulu International Airport	Honolulu, Hawaii, United States	HNL/PHNL	274,434	?	4.2%
47.	(Indonesia) Soekarno-Hatta International Airport	Cengkareng, Jakarta, Java, Indonesia	CGK/WIII	272,877	?	9.1%
48.	(United States) Ronald Reagan Washington National Airport	Arlington County, Virginia, United States	DCA/KDCA	272,146	?	1.9%
49.	(United States) Baltimore/Washington International Thurgood Marshall Airport	Anne Arundel County, Maryland, United States	BWI/KBWI	268,005	?	3.5%
50.	(United States) Fort Lauderdale – Hollywood International Airport	Broward County, Florida, United States	FLL/KFLL	266,979	?	9.7%

== 2008 final statistics ==
Rank	Airport	Location	Code (IATA/ICAO)	Total movements	Rank Change	Change
1.	Hartsfield-Jackson Atlanta International Airport	Atlanta, Georgia, United States	ATL/KATL	978,824	0	1.6%
2.	O'Hare International Airport	Chicago, Illinois, United States	ORD/KORD	881,566	0	4.9%
3.	Dallas/Fort Worth International Airport	Coppell, Euless, Grapevine, and Irving, Texas, United States	DFW/KDFW	656,310	0	4.3%
4.	Los Angeles International Airport	Los Angeles, California, United States	LAX/KLAX	622,506	0	8.6%
5.	Denver International Airport	Denver, Colorado, United States	DEN/KDEN	619,503	0	0.9%
6.	McCarran International Airport	Paradise, Nevada, United States	LAS/KLAS	578,949	0	5.0%
7.	George Bush Intercontinental Airport	Houston, Texas, United States	IAH/KIAH	576,062	0	4.6%
8.	Paris-Charles de Gaulle Airport	Seine-et-Marne, Seine-Saint-Denis, Val-d'Oise, Île-de-France, France	CDG/LFPG	559,816	0	1.3%
9.	Charlotte/Douglas International Airport	Charlotte, North Carolina, United States	CLT/KCLT	536,253	1	2.6%
10.	Phoenix Sky Harbor International Airport	Phoenix, Arizona, United States	PHX/KPHX	502,499	1	6.8%
11.	Philadelphia International Airport	Eastwick, Philadelphia, Pennsylvania, United States	PHL/KPHL	492,038	0	1.5%
12.	Frankfurt Airport	Frankfurt, Hessen, Germany	FRA/EDDF	485,783	0	1.4%
13.	London Heathrow Airport	Hayes, Hillingdon, Greater London, United Kingdom	LHR/EGLL	478,518	1	0.6%
14.	Barajas Airport	Barajas, Madrid, Madrid, Spain	MAD/LEMD	469,740	1	2.8%
15.	Detroit Metropolitan Wayne County Airport	Romulus, Michigan, United States	DTW/KDTW	462,520	0	1.0%
16.	Minneapolis-Saint Paul International Airport	Fort Snelling, Minnesota, United States	MSP/KMSP	450,044	1	0.7%
17.	Amsterdam Airport Schiphol	Haarlemmermeer, Netherlands	AMS/EHAM	446,592	1	1.7%
18.	John F. Kennedy International Airport	Queens, New York City, New York, United States	JFK/KJFK	441,425	0	1.1%
19.	Newark Liberty International Airport	Newark, Elizabeth, New Jersey, United States	EWR/KEWR	434,428	0	0.4%
20.	Munich Airport	Munich, Bavaria, Germany	MUC/EDDM	432,296	0	0.1%
21.	Beijing Capital International Airport	Chaoyang–Shunyi, Beijing, China	PEK/ZBAA	431,670	2	8.0%
22.	Toronto Pearson International Airport	Mississauga, Ontario, Canada	YYZ/CYYZ	430,588	1	1.2%
23.	Salt Lake City International Airport	Salt Lake City, Utah, United States	SLC/KSLC	389,321	1	7.8%
24.	San Francisco International Airport	San Mateo County, California, United States	SFO/KSFO	387,710	5	2.2%
25.	Van Nuys Airport	Van Nuys, California, United States	VNY/KVNY	386,706	?	3.3%
26.	LaGuardia Airport	Queens, New York City, New York, United States	LGA/KLGA	379,414	0	3.2%
27.	Phoenix Deer Valley Airport	Phoenix, Arizona, United States	DVT/KDVT	376,210	3	0.6%
28.	Logan International Airport	Boston, Massachusetts, United States	BOS/KBOS	371,604	4	7.0%
29.	Miami International Airport	Miami-Dade County, Florida, United States	MIA/KMIA	371,519	2	3.8%
30.	Mexico City International Airport	Mexico City, Greater Mexico City, Mexico	MEX/MMMX	366,561	?	3.1%

== 2007 final statistics ==
Rank	Airport	Location	Code (IATA/ICAO)	Total movements	Rank Change	Change
1.	Hartsfield-Jackson Atlanta International Airport	Atlanta, Georgia, United States	ATL/KATL	994,346	0	1.8%
2.	O'Hare International Airport	Chicago, Illinois, United States	ORD/KORD	926,973	0	3.3%
3.	Dallas/Fort Worth International Airport	Coppell, Euless, Grapevine, and Irving, Texas, United States	DFW/KDFW	685,491	0	2.0%
4.	Los Angeles International Airport	Los Angeles, California, United States	LAX/KLAX	680,954	0	3.7%
5.	Denver International Airport	Denver, Colorado, United States	DEN/KDEN	614,065	2	2.8%
6.	McCarran International Airport	Paradise, Nevada, United States	LAS/KLAS	609,472	1	1.6%
7.	George Bush Intercontinental Airport	Houston, Texas, United States	IAH/KIAH	603,656	1	0.2%
8.	Paris-Charles de Gaulle Airport	Seine-et-Marne, Seine-Saint-Denis, Val-d'Oise, Île-de-France, France	CDG/LFPG	552,721	1	2.1%
9.	Phoenix Sky Harbor International Airport	Phoenix, Arizona, United States	PHX/KPHX	539,211	1	1.3%
10.	Charlotte/Douglas International Airport	Charlotte, North Carolina, United States	CLT/KCLT	522,541	1	2.6%
11.	Philadelphia International Airport	Eastwick, Philadelphia, Pennsylvania, United States	PHL/KPHL	499,653	1	3.1%
12.	Frankfurt Airport	Frankfurt, Hessen, Germany	FRA/EDDF	492,569	0	0.7%
13.	Barajas Airport	Barajas, Madrid, Madrid, Spain	MAD/LEMD	483,284	5	11.1%
14.	London Heathrow Airport	Hayes, Hillingdon, Greater London, United Kingdom	LHR/EGLL	481,479	0	0.9%
15.	Detroit Metropolitan Wayne County Airport	Romulus, Michigan, United States	DTW/KDTW	467,230	2	3.0%
16.	Amsterdam Airport Schiphol	Haarlemmermeer, Netherlands	AMS/EHAM	454,360	1	3.2%
17.	Minneapolis-Saint Paul International Airport	Fort Snelling, Minnesota, United States	MSP/KMSP	452,972	2	4.6%
18.	John F. Kennedy International Airport	Queens, New York City, New York, United States	JFK/KJFK	446,348	10	17.2%
19.	Newark Liberty International Airport	Newark, New Jersey, United States	EWR/KEWR	435,691	3	2.0%
20.	Munich Airport	Munich, Bavaria, Germany	MUC/EDDM	431,815	1	5.0%
21.	Toronto Pearson International Airport	Toronto, Ontario, Canada	YYZ/CYYZ	425,500	1	1.8%
22.	Salt Lake City International Airport	Salt Lake City, Utah, United States	SLC/KSLC	422,010	3	0.1%
23.	Beijing Capital International Airport	Chaoyang–Shunyi, Beijing, China	PEK/ZBAA	399,697	7	6.1%
24.	Logan International Airport	Boston, Massachusetts, United States	BOS/KBOS	399,537	1	1.6%
25.	Long Beach Airport	Long Beach, California, United States	LGB/KLGB	398,433	?	7.8%
26.	LaGuardia Airport	Queens, New York City, New York, United States	LGA/KLGA	391,872	2	2.1%
27.	Miami International Airport	Miami-Dade County, Florida, United States	MIA/KMIA	386,058	0	0.4%
28.	Washington Dulles International Airport	Dulles, Virginia, United States	IAD/KIAD	382,939	1	0.9%
29.	San Francisco International Airport	San Mateo County, California, United States	SFO/KSFO	379,500	?	5.7%
30.	Phoenix Deer Valley Airport	Phoenix, Arizona, United States	DVT/KDVT	378,349	7	6.9%

== 2006 final statistics ==
Rank	Airport	Location	Code (IATA/ICAO)	Total movements	Rank Change	Change
1.	Hartsfield-Jackson Atlanta International Airport	Atlanta, Georgia, United States	ATL/KATL	976,447	0	0.4%
2.	O'Hare International Airport	Chicago, Illinois, United States	ORD/KORD	958,643	0	1.4%
3.	Dallas/Fort Worth International Airport	Coppell, Euless, Grapevine, and Irving, Texas, United States	DFW/KDFW	699,344	0	1.8%
4.	Los Angeles International Airport	Los Angeles, California, United States	LAX/KLAX	656,842	0	1.0%
5.	McCarran International Airport	Paradise, Nevada, United States	LAS/KLAS	619,486	0	2.4%
6.	George Bush Intercontinental Airport	Houston, Texas, United States	IAH/KIAH	602,672	0	7.1%
7.	Denver International Airport	Denver, Colorado, United States	DEN/KDEN	597,156	0	6.5%
8.	Phoenix Sky Harbor International Airport	Phoenix, Maricopa, Arizona, United States	PHX/KPHX	546,510	0	3.0%
9.	Paris-Charles de Gaulle Airport	Seine-et-Marne, Seine-Saint-Denis, Val-d'Oise, Île-de-France, France	CDG/LFPG	541,566	2	3.6%
10.	Philadelphia International Airport	Eastwick, Philadelphia, Pennsylvania, United States	PHL/KPHL	515,869	1	3.7%
11.	Charlotte/Douglas International Airport	Charlotte, North Carolina, United States	CLT/KCLT	509,559	2	2.4%
12.	Frankfurt Airport	Frankfurt, Hesse, Germany	FRA/EDDF	489,406	4	0.2%
13.	Detroit Metropolitan Wayne County Airport	Romulus, Michigan, United States	DTW/KDTW	481,740	1	7.7%
14.	London Heathrow Airport	Hayes, Hillingdon, Greater London, United Kingdom	LHR/EGLL	477,041	3	0.2%
15.	Minneapolis-Saint Paul International Airport	Fort Snelling, Minnesota, United States	MSP/KMSP	474,998	5	10.8%
16.	Newark Liberty International Airport	Newark, New Jersey, United States	EWR/KEWR	444,696	3	1.9%
17.	Amsterdam Airport Schiphol	Haarlemmermeer, Netherlands	AMS/EHAM	440,154	3	4.6%
18.	Barajas Airport	Barajas, Madrid, Madrid, Spain	MAD/LEMD	434,959	3	4.6%
19.	Salt Lake City International Airport	Salt Lake City, Utah, United States	SLC/KSLC	421,684	1	7.4%
20.	Toronto Pearson International Airport	Mississauga, Ontario, Canada	YYZ/CYYZ	417,932	3	2.1%
21.	Munich Airport	Munich, Bavaria, Germany	MUC/EDDM	411,335	5	3.1%
22.	Phoenix Deer Valley Airport	Phoenix, Maricopa, Arizona, United States	DVT/KDVT	406,507	7	7.6%
23.	Logan International Airport	Boston, Massachusetts, United States	BOS/KBOS	406,119	1	0.7%
24.	LaGuardia Airport	Queens, New York City, New York, United States	LGA/KLGA	400,298	1	1.2%
25.	Van Nuys Airport	Van Nuys, California, United States	VNY/KVNY	394,915	3	4.0%
26.	Memphis International Airport	Memphis, Tennessee, United States	MEM/KMEM	384,823	0	1.9%
27.	Miami International Airport	Miami-Dade County, Florida, United States	MIA/KMIA	384,477	1	0.8%
28.	John F. Kennedy International Airport	Queens, New York City, New York, United States	JFK/KJFK	380,922	?	8.9%
29.	Washington Dulles International Airport	Dulles, Virginia, United States	IAD/KIAD	379,571	15	25.5%
30.	Beijing Capital International Airport	Chaoyang–Shunyi, Beijing, China	PEK/ZBAA	376,643	?	10.2%

== 2005 final statistics ==
Rank	Airport	Location	Code (IATA/ICAO)	Total movements	Rank Change	Change
1	Hartsfield-Jackson Atlanta International Airport	Atlanta, Georgia, United States	ATL/KATL	990,386	1	1.6%
2	O'Hare International Airport	Chicago, Illinois, United States	ORD/KORD	972,248	1	2.0%
3	Dallas-Ft. Worth International Airport	Coppell, Euless, Grapevine, and Irving, Texas, United States	DFW/KDFW	711,878	0	11.6%
4	Los Angeles International Airport	Los Angeles, California, United States	LAX/KLAX	650,629	0	0.7%
5	McCarran International Airport	Paradise, Nevada, United States	LAS/KLAS	605,046	2	11.1%
6	George Bush Intercontinental Airport	Houston, Texas, United States	IAH/KIAH	562,966	6	8.8%
7	Denver International Airport	Denver, Colorado, United States	DEN/KDEN	560,669	2	0.1%
8	Phoenix Sky Harbor International Airport	Phoenix, Arizona, United States	PHX/KPHX	555,256	2	1.5%
9	Philadelphia International Airport	Philadelphia, Pennsylvania, United States	PHL/KPHL	535,666	4	10.2%
10	Minneapolis-Saint Paul International Airport	Minneapolis, Minnesota, United States	MSP/KMSP	532,240	2	1.6%
11	Paris-Charles de Gaulle Airport	Seine-et-Marne, Seine-Saint-Denis, Val-d'Oise, Île-de-France, France	CDG/LFPG	522,619	2	0.6%
12	Detroit Metropolitan Wayne County Airport	Romulus, Michigan, United States	DTW/KDTW	521,899	2	0.1%
13	Charlotte/Douglas International Airport	Charlotte, North Carolina, United States	CLT/KCLT	521,878	6	11.4%
14	Washington Dulles International Airport	Dulles, Virginia, United States	IAD/KIAD	509,468	2	8.5%
15	Cincinnati/Northern Kentucky International Airport	Hebron, Kentucky, United States	CVG/KCVG	496,364	4	4.1%
16	Frankfurt Airport	Frankfurt, Hesse, Germany	FRA/EDDF	490,147	2	2.7%
17	London Heathrow Airport	Hayes, United Kingdom	LHR/EGLL	477,884	2	0.4%
18	Salt Lake City International Airport	Salt Lake City, Utah, United States	SLC/KSLC	455,472	3	10.6%
19	Newark Liberty International Airport	Newark, New Jersey, United States	EWR/KEWR	437,402	1	0.4%
20	Amsterdam Airport Schiphol	Haarlemmermeer, Netherlands	AMS/EHAM	420,736	0	0.5%
21	Barajas Airport	Madrid, Spain	MAD/LEMD	415,677	3	3.5%
22	Van Nuys Airport	Los Angeles, California, United States	VNY/KVNY	411,317	5	8.3%
23	Toronto Pearson International Airport	Mississauga, Canada	YYZ/CYYZ	409,401	0	1.4%
24	Logan International Airport	Boston, Massachusetts, United States	BOS/KBOS	409,066	2	0.9%
25	LaGuardia Airport	New York, New York, United States	LGA/KLGA	404,853	1	1.3%
26	Munich Airport	Munich, Germany	MUC/EDDM	398,838	2	4.1%
27	Memphis International Airport	Memphis, Tennessee, United States	MEM/KMEM	392,360	0	1.1%
28	Miami International Airport	Miami, Florida, United States	MIA/KMIA	381,610	3	4.8%
29	Phoenix Deer Valley Airport	Phoenix, Maricopa, Arizona, United States	DVT/KDVT	378,225	?	11.1%
30	Long Beach Airport	Long Beach, California, United States	LGB/KLGB	353,011	?	4.1%

== See also ==
- List of busiest airports by international passenger traffic
- List of busiest airports by passenger traffic
- List of busiest airports by cargo traffic
