= National symbols of Singapore =

National symbols of Singapore are the symbols that are used in Singapore to represent what is unique about the nation, reflecting different aspects of its cultural life and history.

== National flag ==
The national flag

The national flag of Singapore was first adopted in 1959, the year Singapore became self-governing within the British Empire. It was reconfirmed as the national flag when the Republic gained independence on 9 August 1965. The design is a horizontal bicolour of red above white, charged in the canton by a white crescent moon facing, toward the fly, a pentagon of five small white five-pointed stars. The elements of the flag denote a young nation on the ascendant, universal brotherhood and equality, and national ideals. The national flag is not used as an ensign by vessels at sea. Depending on a vessel's status, the ship will fly one of three special ensigns.

The Singapore Arms and Flag and National Anthem Rules define the flag's composition and the symbolism of its elements: red symbolises "universal brotherhood and equality of man", and white, "pervading and everlasting purity and virtue". The waxing crescent moon "represents a young nation on the ascendant". The five stars "stand for the nation's ideals of democracy, peace, progress, justice and equality". The ratio of the flag is two units high by three units wide. For the manufacturing of flags, the Government of Singapore recommends a few sizes and suggests that the shade of red used on the flag be Pantone 032.

== Coat of arms ==
The coat of arms of Singapore was adopted in 1959, along with the other national symbols of Singapore. Using elements from the national flag, the coat of arms symbolises the current state and honours its cultural links with Malaysia. While the use of the coat of arms is restricted to the government, the symbol enjoys wide use on the national currency, state decorations and appears on the cover of the national passport.

The central emblem of the coat of arms is a red shield with five white stars resting above a white crescent. The crescent and five stars are also used on the Singapore flag and other various national symbols, such as the national ensign for civilian ships. The symbolism of the red colour, along with the white crescent and stars is the same as that of the national flag. The supporters of the shield are a lion and a tiger; the tiger symbolizes the historical connections to Malaysia and the lion represents Singapore. Below the supporters is a blue ribbon with the national motto, "Majulah Singapura" written in gold. "Majulah Singapura", which is Malay for "Onward Singapore", is also the title of the national anthem of Singapore.

== National anthem ==
"Majulah Singapura" ("Onward Singapore") is the national anthem of Singapore. Composed by Zubir Said in 1958 as a theme song for official functions of the City Council of Singapore, the song was selected in 1959 as the island's anthem when it attained self-government. Upon full independence in 1965, "Majulah Singapura" was formally adopted as Singapore's national anthem. By law the anthem may only be sung with its original Malay lyrics, although official translations exists in English, Mandarin and Tamil. Originally composed in the key of G major, in 2001 the national anthem was officially relaunched in the lower key of F major as this was said to allow for a "grander and more inspiring arrangement".

The national anthem is regularly performed or sung in schools and armed forces camps at ceremonies held at the beginning and/or the end of each day, during which the national flag is also raised and lowered and the national pledge is taken. Singaporeans are especially encouraged to sing the national anthem on occasions of national celebration or national significance such as at the National Day Parade, at National Day observance ceremonies conducted by educational institutions and government departments, and at sporting events at which Singapore teams are participating.
