= List of Singaporean flags =

== National flags ==
| Flag | Duration | Use | Description |
|---|---|---|---|
| | 1959–present | Flag of Singapore | A horizontal bicolour of red over white, charged in white in the canton with a crescent facing towards the fly and a pentagon of five stars. |

== Government ==
| Flag | Duration | Use | Description |
|---|---|---|---|
| | 1960–present | Presidential standard | Used to denote the presence of the president of Singapore while in the country. |
| | 1960–present | State marine ensign | Used by non-military, government vessels. Referred colloquially to as the Blue Ensign. |
| | 1966–present | Civil ensign | Used by Singapore-registered civilian ships. Referred to in law as the Red Ensign. |

== Military ==
| Flag | Duration | Use | Description |
|---|---|---|---|
| Link to image | 1965–present | Flag of the Singapore Armed Forces | The flag of Singapore with the emblem of the Singapore Armed Forces on the lower fly. |
| Link to image | 1965–present | Service flag of the Singapore Army | A red canton bearing a crescent and stars, with the remaining 3/4 of the flag in yellow, and the emblem of the Singapore Armed Forces on the lower fly. |
| | 1965–present | Colour of the Singapore Army | The same as the service flag of the Singapore Army, but without the emblem. |
| Link to image | 1990–present | Service flag of the Republic of Singapore Air Force | A red canton bearing a crescent and stars, with the remaining 3/4 of the flag in blue, and the Lion Head symbol as a roundel on the lower fly. |
| | 1990–present | Colour of the Republic of Singapore Air Force | The same as the service flag of the Republic of Singapore Air Force, but without the roundel. |
| | 1967–present | Service flag and naval ensign of the Republic of Singapore Navy | A red canton bearing a crescent and stars, with the remaining 3/4 of the flag in white, and the mariner's compass rose on the lower fly. The naval ensign is mandated to be of a 1:2 ratio (top) as set out in the Misc.1 of 1967 legislation passed in the Parliament of Singapore. However, a 2:3 variant is used today (bottom). |
| | 1965–present | Commissioning pennant | Triangular pennant with the crescent and stars at the hoist; flown at the highest mast of commissioned naval ships at all times. |
| Link to image | 2022–present | Service flag of the Digital and Intelligence Service | A red canton bearing a crescent and stars, with the remaining 3/4 of the flag in grey, and the DIS crest on the lower fly. |
| | 2022–present | Colour of the Digital Intelligence Service | The same as the service flag of the DIS, but without the crest. |

== Miscellaneous ==
| Flag | Duration | Use | Description |
|---|---|---|---|
| | 1929–2021 | Malaysia Preventive Service flag | To be used by Malaysian-owned ships when operating in Singaporean waters. Repealed on 1 March 2021. |

== Historical flags ==
| Flag | Duration | Use | Description |
|---|---|---|---|
| | 1398–1400 | Flag of Majapahit | "Red and white" |
| | 1614–1636 | Flag of the Aceh Sultanate | A red field with a white crescent and star. A sword is below them. |
| | 1636–1819 | Flag of the Johor Sultanate | A simple white banner. |
| | 1819–1868 | Flag of the British East India Company | Horizontal red and white stripes, with the Union Jack in the canton. |
| | 1868–1877 | Flag of the Straits Settlements | A Blue Ensign with a crown in the lower fly. |
| | 1877–1904 | Flag of the Straits Settlements | A Blue Ensign with a badge in the fly, a white disc containing a lozenge-shaped symbol bearing three crowns. Officially adopted in 1877 when Singapore was joined with Malacca and Penang as a single Crown colony. |
| | 1904–1925 | Flag of the Straits Settlements | Similar to the previous flag, with different crowns. |
| | 1925–1942; 1945–1946 | Flag of the Straits Settlements | Similar to the previous flag, without the white disc. |
| | 1942–1945 | Flag of Japan | Used during the Japanese occupation of Singapore. Still the current flag of Japan. |
| | 1946–1952 | Flag of the Crown colony of Singapore | Adopted when Singapore became a Crown colony on its own following the dissolution of the Crown colony of the Straits Settlements. |
| | 1952–1959 | Flag of the Crown colony of Singapore | Modification from the previous flag; this version has a slightly modified crown. |
| | 1963–1965 | Flag of Malaysia | Used in Singapore during its statehood in Malaysia. Still the current flag of Malaysia. |

== See also ==
- Armorial of Singapore
- Majulah Singapura
