= Merdeka Lions =

1956 stone sculptures by Raoul Bigazzi and L. W. Carpenter

- 默迪卡雄狮 (Chinese)
- Replicas of the Merdeka Lions in front of the National Stadium
- Artist: Raoul Bigazzi
- Designer: L. W. Carpenter
- Year: 1956
- Medium: Stone
- Movement: Abstract (head and mane of the lions); Realism (body and limbs of the lions)
- Subject: Two lions
- Weight: 2,268 kilograms (5,000 lb) (each sculpture)
- Location: SAFTI Military Institute, Singapore; 1°20′02″N 103°40′50″E
- Owner: Ministry of Defence
- Commissioner: Public Works Department

The Merdeka Lions (Chinese: 默迪卡雄狮; pinyin: Mòdíkǎ Xióngshī) are a pair of stone sculptures. Displayed near an observation tower at the SAFTI Military Institute in Jurong West, Singapore, each sculpture depicts a lion – the head and mane are sculptured to be abstract while the body and limbs are realistic.

== History ==
The Merdeka Bridge – designed to alleviate traffic at Kallang, Geylang, and Mountbatten Roads – began construction in July 1954. As part of the bridge's design, the Public Works Department wanted two stone sculptures of a lion. L. W. Carpenter of the PWD's Architecture Branch sketched a design of the lions and sent it to the Italian artist Raoul Bigazzi in Hong Kong. Bigazzi made models based on the sketches and photographed them for the PWD. After the PWD gave Bigazzi suggestions and alterations on the sculpture, Bigazzi travelled to Manila to have the statue cast, which was done by one of his students. Both sculptures costed $14,200. By August 1956, the casts were shipped to Singapore and on 17 August 1956, the Merdeka Bridge opened. Both ends of the bridge featured one of the sculptures next to a tall stone structure adorned with blue mosaic tiles.

Merdeka Bridge was widened in 1966 to have three additional lanes. As a result, the sculptures were moved to Kallang Park. Following the launch of the lion head symbol as a national symbol of Singapore in 1986, readers of Lianhe Zaobao pointed out that the stone sculptures and the lion head symbol were similar and should thus, according to The Straits Times, "be treated with due respect". Lianhe Zaobao agreed and wrote to Richard Tan, a deputy director at the Ministry of Communications and Information Technology. Tan, who visited the lions in April 1987, stated that "these lions have a rich historical background that has a link with Singapore's past. They have been referred to as the Merdeka Lions and are a sign of our independence. They are a symbol of Singapore as a nation". Various locations such as carparks and building entrances were considered, but were found to be unsuitable as the orientation of the lions' heads did not face the viewer.

The PWD transferred the Merdeka Lions to the Ministry of Defence (MINDEF) in 1987 or 1988. MINDEF, who wanted the Merdeka Lions for their new SAFTI Military Institute as they "epitomise courage and fighting spirit, values we hold very dear in the [Singapore Armed Forces]", stored the sculptures in boxes at Pasir Laba Camp. The Straits Times reported on 23 May 1993 that the Merdeka Lions were missing, but received phone calls from SAFTI staff and reservists confirming that the Merdeka Lions were with MINDEF. By then, the sculptures were in good condition, though they had some damage. The Merdeka Lions were installed near a 17-storey observation tower at the SAFTI Military Institute in July 1995, and the military institute opened on 26 August 1995. As part of its heritage trail for the Kallang area, the National Heritage Board unveiled a replica of the Merdeka Lions in May 2019. The replicas – positioned in front of the National Stadium and facing the Kallang Basin – are a landmark in the trail.

== Details ==
The Merdeka Lions are a pair of stone sculptures, each depicting a lion. The sculptures are located in front of a 17-storey observation tower at the SAFTI Military Institute in Jurong West. Although the bodies and limbs of the lions are realistic, the head and mane of the lions are depicted to be abstract. Each sculpture weighs 2,268 kilograms (5,000 lb).
