= Security Intelligence Middle East =

WW2 British intelligence organisation

Security Intelligence Middle East (SIME) (1939–1946) was an organisation made up of a number of British intelligence agencies supporting the British Military Government during the Second World War, based in Cairo, Egypt. It was composed of Security Service (MI5), with Secret Intelligence Service (MI6) provided by liaison officers and army Intelligence Corps personnel (including Field Security teams), but MI5 were the lead agency and provided the focus.

SIME was created in December 1939 as the British Government sought to develop a more focussed approach to counter intelligence and developing security intelligence on the spectrum of threats from espionage, subversion, sabotage and eventually terrorism. SIME's first chief (titled Defence Security Officer) was Colonel Raymond John Maunsell, although he had moved on by February 1945 as he was recorded as being at Supreme Headquarters Allied Expeditionary Force G2 based in northwestern Europe. Another source (Hashimoto) notes that Maunsell's successor to SIME started in 1944, suggesting that Maunsell had moved on by then.

A record of a 1947 visit by two senior Security Service officers to SIME confirmed that it was still based in Cairo and had offices in Baghdad, Jerusalem and Cyprus.

According to Nigel West, Maunsell was succeeded by the following as Chief of SIME, however Hashimoto, in his 2013 doctoral thesis provides dates of service for the other heads of SIME but does not have David Stewart listed. Elsewhere Hashimoto notes that David Stewart had served as Deputy Head of SIME.

- Brigadier Douglas Roberts (1944–2001)
- William (Bill) Morgan Tilson Magan (1947–1951)
- Robin William George Stephens (1951–1953)
- David Stewart
- William (Bill) Oughton (1953–1955)
- Philip Kirby-Green (1955–1958)

The SIME organisational model was in employed elsewhere and in 1946 Security Intelligence Far East (SIFE) was established. SIME was disbanded in 1958.
