= Security Intelligence Far East =

Security Intelligence Far East (SIFE) was a British intelligence organization created in 1946 as the Far Eastern regional headquarters of the Security Service, MI5. It was based in British-controlled Singapore and established by Colonel Cyril Egerton Dixon, a career MI5 officer with a great deal of war time counter intelligence experience in Britain and India. SIFE (like SIME) was also a MI5 controlled organisation, which partially merged its counterintelligence section with the regional headquarters of MI6 in 1950. SIFE controlled a number of MI5 Defence Security Officers (from 1949, named Security Liaison Officers) in Singapore, Kuala Lumpur, Malaya and across the Far East.

SIFE was headquartered in Phoenix Park, Singapore which was also where the headquarters of British Commission-General for Southeast Asia Malcolm MacDonald’s headquarters were located.

== Organization ==
SIFE’s primary objective was to collect, collate, and assess intelligence produced by intelligence agencies in the Far East, such as the Malayan Secret Service (MSS) in Malaya and Singapore and the British Special Branches in Hong Kong and Burma. Unlike the MSS, SIFE did not run any agents on the ground. Whereas SIFE’s Charter allowed it to run intelligence operations across British territories across the Far East, the MSS’s Charter limited it to Malaya and Singapore.

== Charter ==
SIFE is an inter-Services organisation responsible for the collection and dissemination of all security intelligence affecting British territories in the Far East to interested and appropriate Service and Civil Departments.

(a) Head/SIFE is responsible to the Director General of the Security Service and locally in Singapore to the Defence Committee jointly and the Commanders-in-Chief individually. His responsibilities to the authorities in Burma will be determined when their position has been clarified.

(b) Head/SIFE is the ‘theatre head’ for the Security Services and in this capacity responsible for ensuring that the flow of intelligence to and from the Defence Security Officers [DSOs] in the Far East meets the requirements of SIFE. He will also be responsible for the distribution of SIFE staff throughout the theatre in accordance with current requirements.

(c) Head/SIFE will be a member of the Joint Intelligence Committee, Singapore, as the SIFE representative in Hong Kong will be a member of the Joint Intelligence Committee, Hong Kong.

(d) SIFE will maintain close relations with MI6 in the Far East. It will maintain liaison for the same purpose with the Director, Intelligence Bureau, Government of India, and the Director of the Australian Commonwealth Security Service, and other Security Service links overseas.

(e) SIFE cannot be called upon to reveal its sources of information to any other organisation or outside authority. It is, however, within the discretion of Head/SIFE to do so in a case where he considers it desirable or expedient to do so, subject to obtaining the consent of any other organisation which may control or have an interest in the matter. In important cases, the matter should be referred to the Director General of the Security Service [MI5].

== Heads of SIFE ==
There are records of eight SIFE heads after Colonel Dixon:

- Malcolm Johnson 1946–1947
- Hugh Winterborn 1947–1948
- Alex Kellar 1948–1949
- Jack Morton 1949–1952
- Courtenay Young 1952–1955
- Richard Thistlethwaite 1955–1959
- Michael Friend Serpell 1960–1962
- Christopher Alfred Herbert 1962-1963.

SIFE was disbanded in 1963, as British military commitments in Singapore and Malaysia reduced and the birth of an independent Malaysia approached, which Singapore was initially part of.
