= Cecil Dixon (cricketer) =

Scottish cricketer and intelligence officer

Personal information
- Full name: Cecil Egerton Dixon
- Born: 21 July 1903; Duns, Berwickshire, Scotland
- Died: 3 March 1973 (aged 69); Rye, Sussex, England
- Batting: Right-handed

Domestic team information
- Years: Team
- 1929: Hampshire

Career statistics
Competition	First-class
Matches	2
Runs scored	10
Batting average	2.50
100s/50s	–/–
Top score	10
Catches/stumpings	–/–
- Source: Cricinfo, 26 January 2010

Cecil Egerton Dixon (21 July 1903 — 3 March 1973) was a Scottish first-class cricketer and an officer in the Intelligence Corps during the Second World War.

The son of Brigadier-General Henry Grey Dixon, he was born in July 1903 at Duns, Berwickshire. He was educated in England at Wellington College, before attending the Royal Military College at Sandhurst. He graduated from there into the King's Own Scottish Borderers (KOSB) as a second lieutenant in 1921, before being promoted to lieutenant in August 1925. Dixon played first-class cricket for Hampshire in the 1926 County Championship, making two appearances against Gloucestershire at Southampton and Derbyshire at Chesterfield. He resigned his commission with the KOSB in January 1931, becoming a steel merchant.

During the Second World War, Dixon was an emergency commission with the rank of second lieutenant, being appointed into the Intelligence Corps. He held the war substantive rank of captain by September 1943. His early war service saw him appointed by MI5 to be the Regional Security Liaison Officer at Cambridge, where he was involved with the apprehension of several German spies who had parachuted into Britain. Amongst these were Gösta Caroli, Wulf Schmidt, Josef Jakobs, and Karel Richard Richter. Later in the war, he served in British India with the Intelligence Bureau, where he helped to establish the Counter Intelligence Combined Board. Following the war, Dixon established the Security Intelligence Far East in 1946, serving as its head before passing its leadership onto Malcolm Johnson of MI5. After the end of his military career, he acted as secretary of the West African Institute For Trypanosomiasis Research. Dixon died at Rye in March 1973.
