= Raymond John Maunsell =

British Army intelligence officer (1903–1976)

Raymund John Maunsell
- Born: 25 November 1903; London, England
- Died: 4 November 1976 (72); Jersey, Channel Islands
- Military career
- Allegiance: United Kingdom
- Branch: British Army/Royal Tank Regiment/Transjordan Frontier Force
- Rank: Brigadier
- Service number: 27241
- Unit: SIME
- Conflicts: Egypt
- Awards: CBE, US Legion of Merit

Raymund John Maunsell CBE (1903-1976) was a British Army Intelligence Officer.

Maunsell was born on 25 November 1903 in London, England and his birth was registered in Lewisham Borough.

He was commissioned into the Royal Tank Corps on 30 August 1923.

He was recorded as the head of Security Intelligence Middle East (SIME) based in Cairo in 1939.

On 6 January 1944 he was awarded Commander of the Most Excellent Order of the British Empire (CBE) for his work in the Middle East.

On 16 January 1947 he was awarded the US Legion of Merit.

Maunsell died on Jersey in the Channel Islands on 4 November 1976.
