= Majulah Singapura =

National anthem of Singapore

English: Onward Singapore
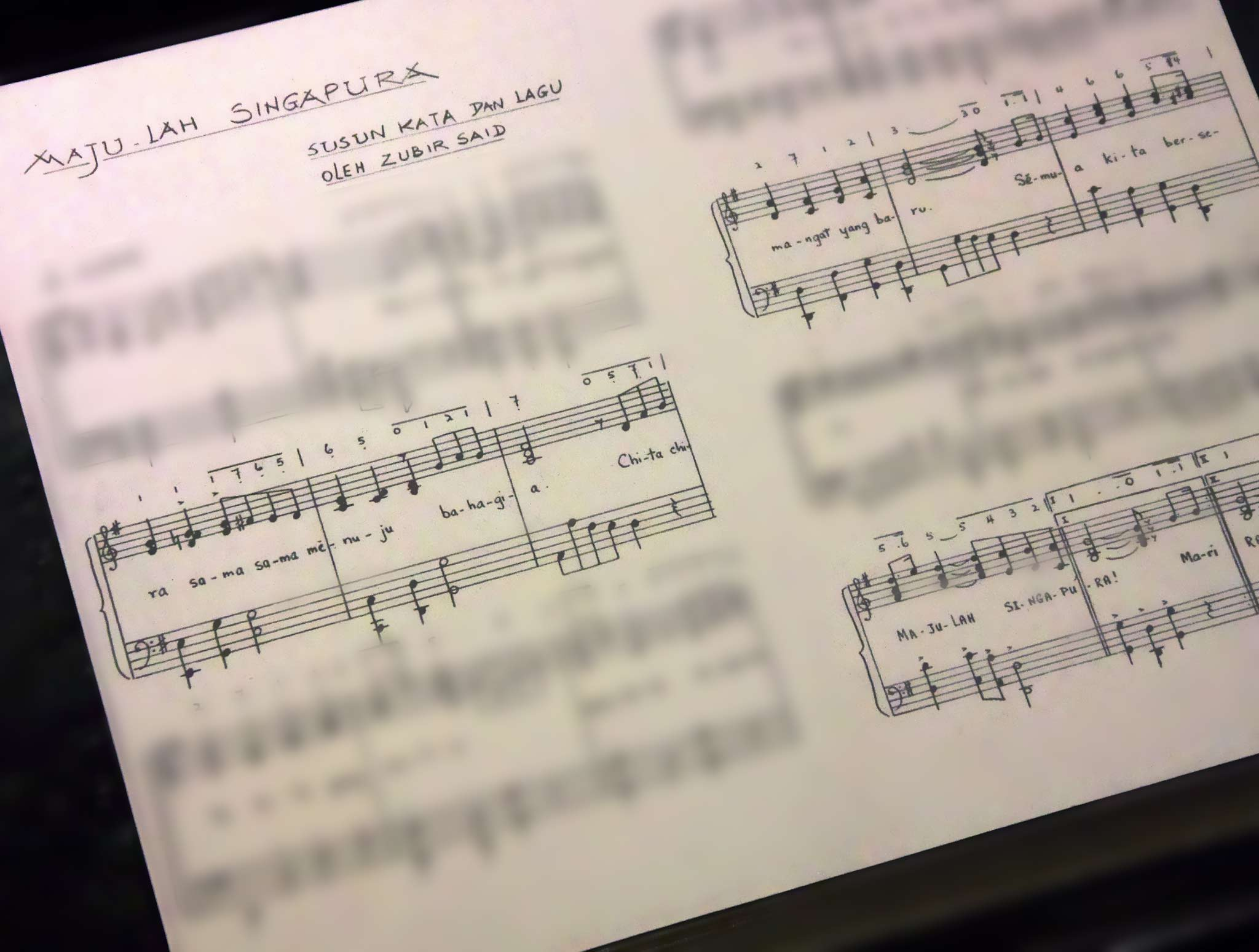
- Replica of Zubir Said's handwritten score of "Majulah Singapura" exhibited at the National Museum of Singapore. The original is currently on display at the Malay Heritage Centre.
- National anthem of Singapore
- Lyrics: Zubir Said, 1958
- Music: Zubir Said, 1958
- Adopted: 11 November 1959

Audio sample
- U.S. Navy Band instrumental version in B-flat major: file; help

Sample of an official 2019 orchestral and choral vocal recording in F major

"Majulah Singapura" (Note: Malay pronunciation: [mad͡ʒulah siŋapura]; English: "Onward Singapore"; Chinese: 前进吧，新加坡; Tamil: முன்னேறட்டும் சிங்கப்பூர்) is the national anthem and motto of Singapore. Composed by Zubir Said in 1958 as a theme song for official functions of the City Council of Singapore, the song was selected in 1959 as the nation's anthem when it attained self-government. Upon full independence in 1965, "Majulah Singapura" was formally adopted as Singapore's national anthem. By law, the anthem must be sung with Malay lyrics, but there are authorised translations of the lyrics of the anthem in Singapore's three other official languages: English, Mandarin and Tamil.

The national anthem is regularly performed or sung in schools and armed forces camps at ceremonies held at the beginning and/or the end of each day, during which the national flag is also raised and lowered and the national pledge is taken. Singaporeans are especially encouraged to sing the national anthem on occasions of national celebration or national significance such as at the National Day Parade (NDP), National Day Concert (NDC), at National Day observance ceremonies conducted by educational institutions and government departments and at sporting events at which Singapore teams are participating.

Originally composed in the key of G major, the national anthem was officially relaunched in 2001 in the lower key of F major as it was said to allow for a "grander and more inspiring arrangement".

== History ==
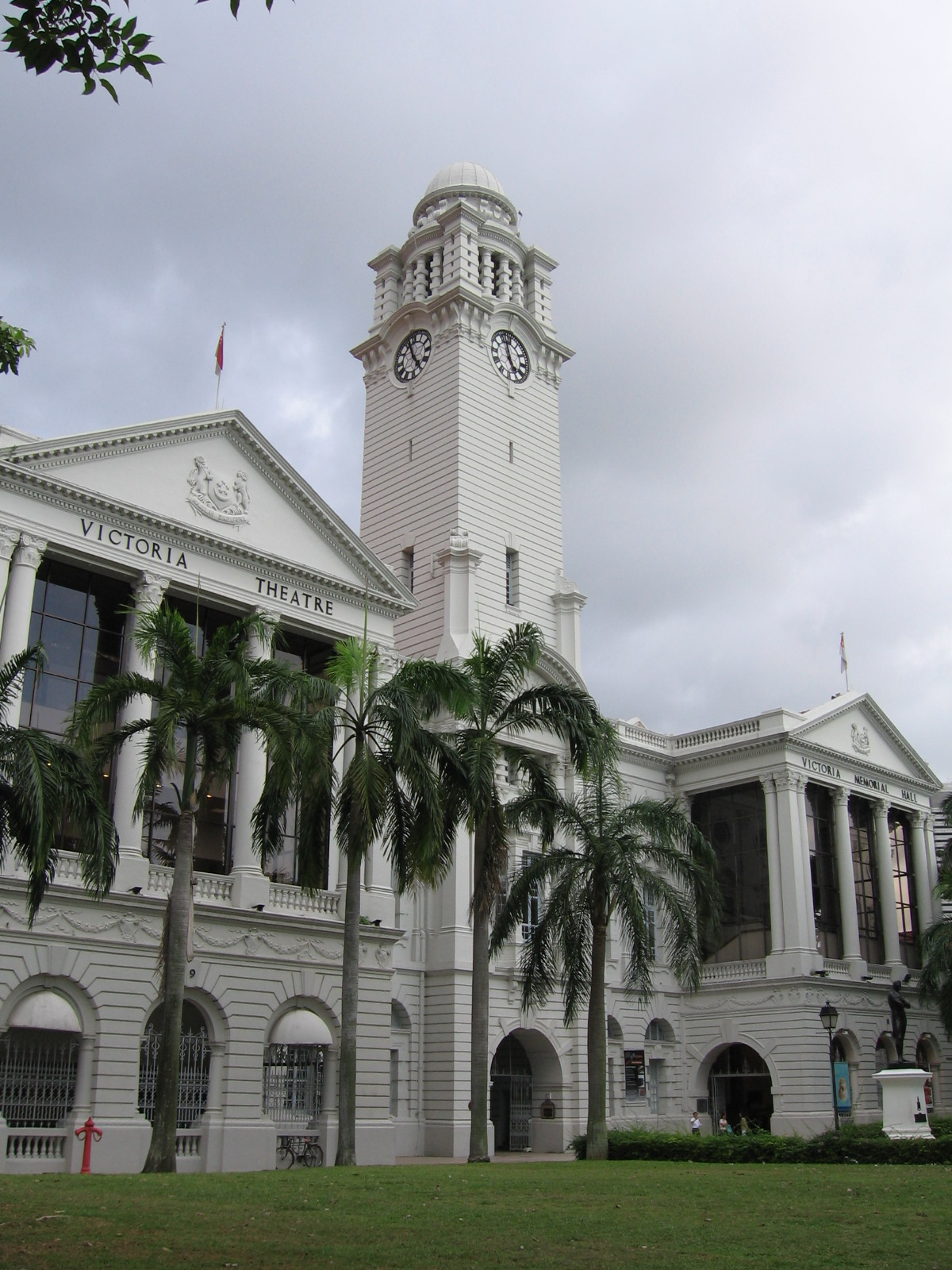
The Victoria Theatre and Concert Hall as it appeared in January 2006. Victoria Theatre was the venue for the first public performance of "Majulah Singapura" on 6 September 1958.

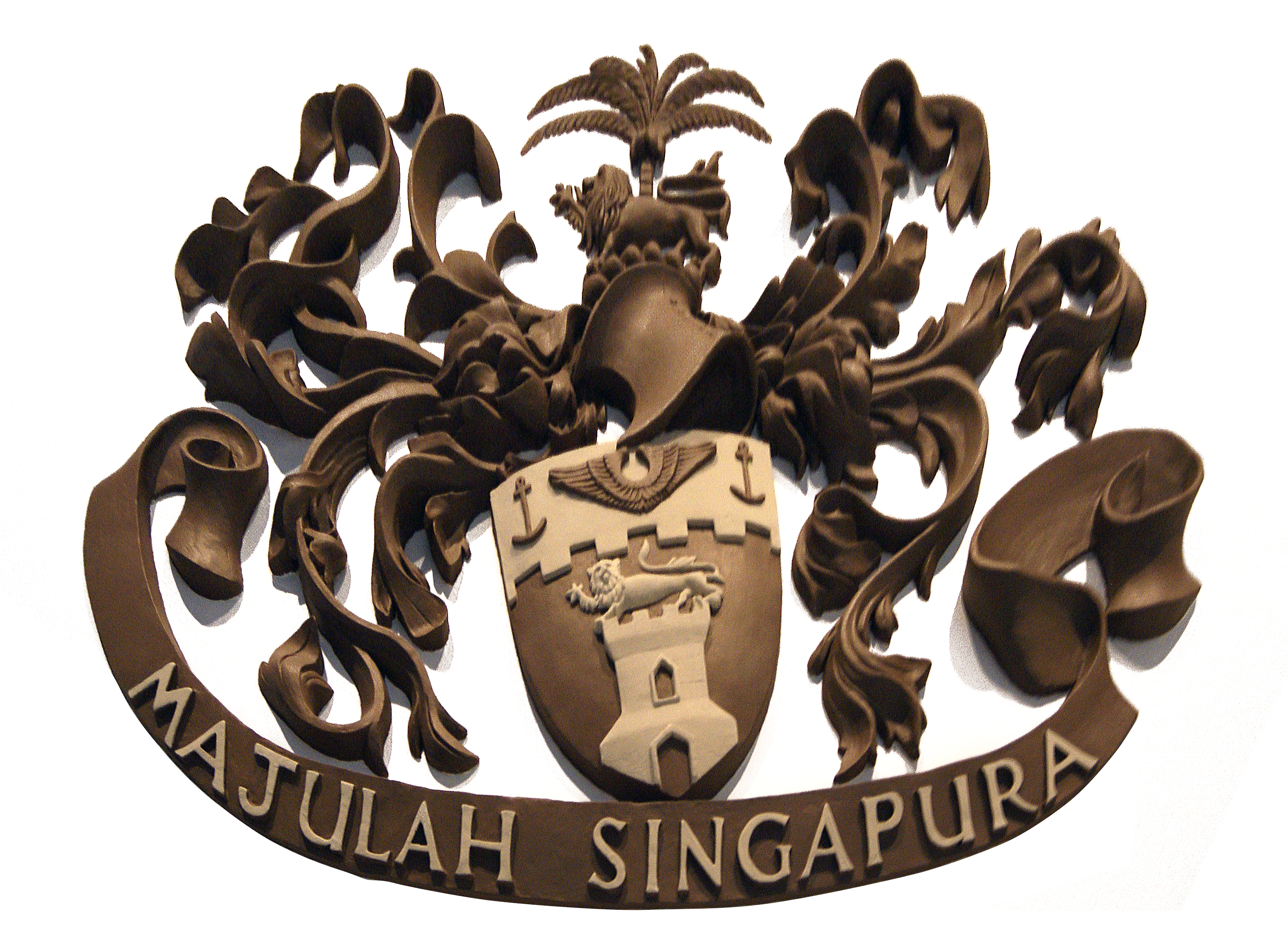
The coat of arms of the Singapore Municipal Commission in Victoria Theatre, with the motto "Majulah Singapura"

The composition of "Majulah Singapura" occurred during a push for independence from the United Kingdom. Before its creation, the Colony of Singapore's national anthem was "God Save the King (or Queen)". In 1951, the colony was conferred city status by a royal charter from King George VI. In July 1958, Ong Pang Boon, the Deputy Mayor of the City Council of Singapore, approached Zubir Said, a score arranger and songwriter with Cathay-Keris Film Productions, to compose a theme song for the Council's official functions to be titled "Majulah Singapura" (Malay for "Onward Singapore"). This phrase was chosen as it was a motto to be displayed in the Victoria Theatre after its renovation in 1958.

Zubir took two weeks to finish composing the music and lyrics for the song. In a 1984 oral history interview, he recalled the process: "[T]he difficulty is in such a short melody, I have to put in all the words.... [I]t must be very simple, understandable for all the races in Singapore.... I consult also [sic] an author in Malay language so that I can do it in proper Malay language but not too deep and not too difficult." Summing up his philosophy when composing the anthem, Zubir cited the Malay proverb "Di mana bumi dipijak, di situ langit dijunjung" ("You should hold up the sky of the land where you live").

The completed composition was first performed on 6 September 1958 by the Singapore Chamber Ensemble during the grand finale of a concert staged in the Victoria Theatre to celebrate its official reopening.

In 1959, Singapore attained self-government and the City Council was dissolved. The Government felt that a national anthem was needed to unite the different races in Singapore. The Deputy Prime Minister Toh Chin Chye selected the City Council's song as it was already popular. At Toh's request, Zubir modified the lyrics and melody, and the revised song was adopted by the Legislative Assembly on 11 November 1959. On 30 November, the Singapore State Arms and Flag and National Anthem Ordinance 1959 was passed to regulate the use and display of these national emblems.

"Majulah Singapura" was formally introduced to the nation on 3 December when Yusof bin Ishak was inaugurated as the Yang di-Pertuan Negara, Singapore's head of state. At the same occasion, which also marked the launch of "Loyalty Week", the national flag and the state crest were introduced. After Singapore's full independence from Malaysia on 9 August 1965, "Majulah Singapura" was formally adopted as the Republic's national anthem.

== Use ==
=== Occasions ===
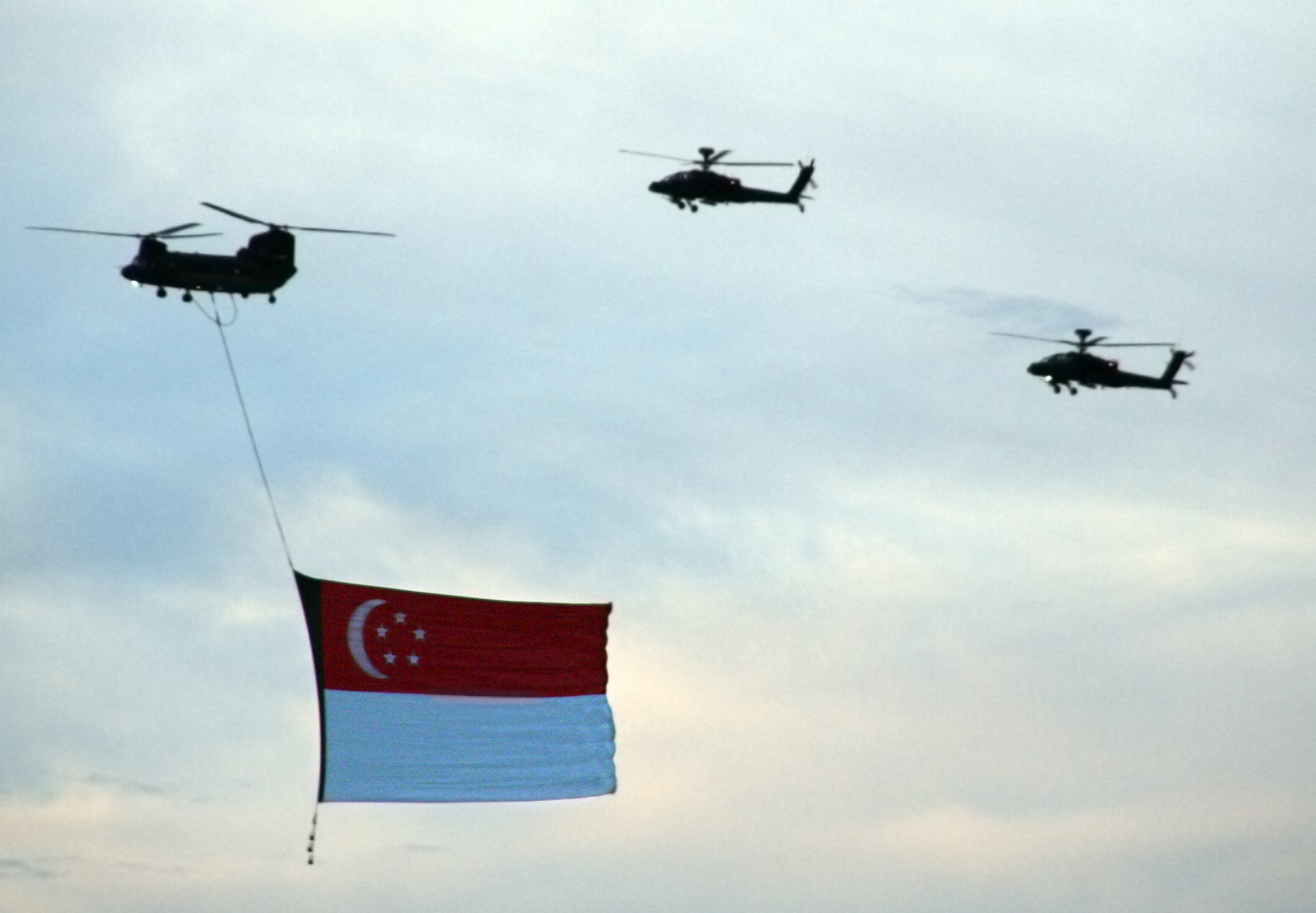
A giant Singapore flag suspended from a CH-47 Chinook helicopter during a National Day Parade rehearsal on 29 July 2006. The flyover occurred while "Majulah Singapura" was being played.

In Singapore, primary schools at lower levels, lessons relating to the national anthem and the singing of the national anthem are carried out as part of the civics and moral education programme. The national anthem is sung in all mainstream schools and armed forces camps at ceremonies held at the beginning and/or the end of each day, during which the national flag is also raised and lowered and the Singapore National Pledge is taken. Both the anthem and the national pledge must not be used for commercial situations.

Singaporeans are especially encouraged to sing the national anthem on occasions of national celebration or national significance, such as at the National Day Parade, at National Day observance ceremonies conducted by educational institutions and government departments and at sporting events at which Singapore teams are participating. In November 2004, Olivia Ong, an 18-year-old Singaporean based in Tokyo, sang "Majulah Singapura" at the 2006 FIFA World Cup Asian qualifying rounds at Saitama Stadium in Saitama, Japan.

Two months later in January 2005, Singapore Idol Taufik Batisah was invited to become the first performer to sing "Majulah Singapura" at an international football game at the National Stadium in Singapore – the return leg of the Tiger Cup (now the AFF Football Championship) final between Singapore and Indonesia in Singapore. Due to National Service commitments, Taufik had to decline and was replaced by singer Jai Wahab. In July 2005, Singaporean singer and actress Jacintha Abisheganaden sang the national anthem at the Esplanade – Theatres on the Bay during the opening ceremony of the 117th Session of the International Olympic Committee, at which London was selected to host the 2012 Summer Olympics.

In August 2016, "Majulah Singapura" was performed for the first time at the medal ceremony of the Olympic Games, after Singaporean swimmer Joseph Schooling won the gold medal at the Men's 100 metre butterfly.

In August 2019, retired local rocker singer Ramli Sarip sang a "soul-stirring" rocker rendition of the national anthem at the annual National Day Parade, which was received with mixed reviews and criticisms. As a ground-up initiative, a music video based on Sarip's rendition was released on 3 December 2019 as well. Many netizens lambasted the rendition as if it is the funeral version. Even Rohana Zubir (daughter of the late Zubir Said who was the original composer) came out to criticise the rocker's rendition in an open letter in public, she wrote that, "Sadly, the revised rendition of 'Majulah Singapura' lacks the quality, the oomph, of a national anthem. It is rather tortuous to listen to." She added: "The people of Singapore are wonderfully creative but this creativity should not extend to meddling with the musical score of the country's national anthem. This is one area where there should not be change. It is also important for Singaporeans to be proud of their history and to respect individuals, such as my father, for their contribution to nation-building."

=== Salutes ===
It is conventional for persons present when the national anthem is performed to stand with their arms by their sides.

When the national flag is raised or lowered and the anthem is played, persons in military or paramilitary uniforms who are outdoors don their head dress and face the flag. If they are in formation under the orders of a commander, only the commander salutes; otherwise, all service personnel salute. Saluting is unnecessary if service personnel are indoors when a flag raising or lowering ceremony takes place. In such cases, persons need only stop what they are doing and stand at attention.

=== Other uses ===
The national anthem is played at sign-offs of TV and radio stations in Singapore, but that use of the anthem has changed since 24-hour broadcasting was introduced:

- On television, Mediacorp's Channel 5 and Channel 8 play the anthem just before 6:00 am and midnight daily to signal the start and end of their respective channel's broadcast day. The same practice is done on CNA's domestic feed as well as Malay-language Suria and Tamil-language Vasantham where the latter two channels continue to start up and close down their broadcast day.
  - During its run on television, Channel U's founder Singapore Press Holdings initiated the use of authorised translations during the anthem at sign-offs of channels (depending on the respective channel's main language). The practice ended on 1 January 2005, when SPH's MediaWorks properties were merged with Mediacorp; the latter revived the use from 2012 to 2024, albeit with the translated lyrics only appearing on non-Malay TV channels.
- On radio, all stations begin their daily broadcast by playing the national anthem at 6:00 am; since the release of the anthem's re-recording on 3 December 2019, the full version is being used. Mediacorp-owned Malay-language station Warna 942, meanwhile, plays the anthem an hour earlier at 5:00 am, as protocol to avoid conflict with the Azan Subuh broadcasts (which, for several months of the year, runs past the 6:00 am hour).

The national anthem has lent its name to the Majulah Connection, a Singapore-based not-for-profit organisation set up November 2002 to connect Singapore with overseas Singaporeans and friends of Singapore. The organisation was formally established as a non-governmental organisation (NGO) in January 2003.

=== Guidelines for use ===
The use of the national anthem is governed by Part IV of the Singapore Arms and Flag and National Anthem Rules made under the Singapore Arms and Flag and National Anthem Act. These rules provide as follows:

- The national anthem may be performed or sung on any appropriate occasion. In particular, it must be performed when the President receives a general salute.
- When the national anthem is performed or sung, every person present must stand as a mark of respect.
- As regards musical arrangements of the national anthem:
  - Any person performing or singing the national anthem must do so according to the official arrangement set out in the Third Schedule to the Act or any other arrangement permitted under the next paragraph of the Act.
  - The national anthem may be rearranged in any manner that is in keeping with the dignity due to it, subject to the following conditions:
    (a) the national anthem must not be incorporated into any other composition or medley; and
    (b) every arrangement of the national anthem must accurately reflect the complete tune and the complete official lyrics of the National Anthem.
  - Any person who sings the national anthem must follow the official lyrics and must not sing any translation of those lyrics.

It is an offence for any person to knowingly perform or sing the national anthem in contravention of rule 13(1) (not performing or singing the anthem according to the official arrangement or any other permitted arrangement) or 13(3) (not singing the anthem according to the official lyrics or singing a translation of the lyrics); the penalty is a fine not exceeding S$1,000.

In addition, guidelines issued by the Ministry of Communications and Information (MCI) state that either instrumental or vocal versions of the national anthem may be performed and that dignity and decorum should be observed whenever the anthem is played or sung.

== Arrangements and recordings ==
An abridged version of "Majulah Singapura" had been used by official bodies since 1963, but an expanded version, used only at grand ceremonial functions, exists. The versions were arranged by an Englishman, Michael Hurd. The arrangement was first recorded by the Singapore Symphony Orchestra under the baton of Lim Yau in 1989.

The original version of the national anthem was in the key of G major, but in 1983, schools were issued an educational tape describing common mistakes made in singing the anthem and given the option of singing the anthem in F major. (It was the very version that was first demonstrated to the public during the 1984 Singapore National Day Parade.) In 1993, the shorter version of "Majulah Singapura" was declared to be the official one.

On 19 January 2001, "Majulah Singapura" was officially relaunched in the F-major key, as it was said to be a "grander and more inspiring arrangement" of the anthem. The Ministry of Information and the Arts (MITA, now the Ministry of Communications and Information (MCI)) took more than a year to produce the new version. Its main objective was to make the anthem more accessible to all Singaporeans. In May 2000, several leading local composers were invited to rearrange the national anthem in F major. An evaluation panel was headed by Bernard Tan. He proposed that the original composition in G major resulted in a highest note being E, which he felt was too high pitched to sing easily, so he proposed a slightly lower F major that results in the highest note being a more easily sung D. The panel selected the version submitted by Cultural Medallion winner Phoon Yew Tien. Phoon's orchestration employed a slower tempo and used more instruments to create a majestic rendition of the anthem. MITA then commissioned Ken Lim to produce a recording by the Singapore Symphony Orchestra conducted by Lim Yau, which was carried out at the Victoria Concert Hall on 20 November 2000. The new arrangement was recorded in seven versions, including two orchestral versions (instrumental, and with soloist Jacintha Abisheganaden and the Singapore Youth Choir) and a piano solo version.

On 3 December 2019, a new recording of "Majulah Singapura" by the Singapore Symphony Orchestra was released with improvements in sound quality. The new version was first broadcast at National Gallery, exactly 60 years after the anthem was first released. In addition, this version is 5 seconds shorter than the 2001 recording. The new version was recorded at The Esplanade Concert Hall on 7 August 2019. The new recording still uses Phoon Yew Tien's arrangement, albeit with more young voices.

== Lyrics ==
Official Malay lyrics

Mari kita rakyat Singapura
Sama-sama menuju bahagia
Cita-cita kita yang mulia
Berjaya Singapura

𝄆 Marilah kita bersatu
Dengan semangat yang baru
Semua kita berseru
𝄆 Majulah Singapura 𝄇 𝄇

IPA transcription (Note: See Help:IPA/Malay and Malay phonology.)

[ma.'ri ki.'tə 'ra(ʔ).jat̚ si.ŋa.pu.'ra]
['sa.mə.sa.mə mə.'nu.d͡ʒu ba.ha.gi.'ə]
[t͡ʃi.tə.t͡ʃi.'tə 'ki.'tə 'jaŋ 'mu.li.'ə]
[bər.d͡ʒa.'jə si.ŋa.pu.'ra]

𝄆 ['ma.ri.laː(h) 'ki.'tə bər.sa.'tu]
[də.ŋan sə.'ma.'ŋat̚ jaŋ 'ba.'ru]
[sə.mu.'ə 'ki.'tə bər.sə.'ru]
𝄆 ['ma.d͡ʒu.laː(h) si.ŋa.pu.'ra] 𝄇 𝄇

Official Mandarin translation

来吧，新加坡人民
让我们共同向幸福迈进；
我们崇高的理想，
要使新加坡成功。

𝄆 来吧，让我们以新的精神，
团结在一起；
我们齐声欢呼：
𝄆 前进吧，新加坡！𝄇 𝄇

Official Tamil translation

சிங்கப்பூர் மக்கள் நாம்
செல்வோம் மகிழ்வை நோக்கியே
சிங்கப்பூரின் வெற்றிதான்
சிறந்த நம் நாட்டமே

𝄆 ஒன்றிணைவோம் அனைவரும்
ஓங்கிடும் புத்துணர்வுடன்
முழங்குவோம் ஒன்றித்தே
𝄆 முன்னேறட்டும் சிங்கப்பூர் 𝄇 𝄇

Literal English translation

We, the people of Singapore
Together march towards happiness
Our noble aspiration
To make Singapore a success

𝄆 Let us all unite
In a new spirit
Together we proclaim
𝄆 Onward Singapore 𝄇 𝄇

Official English translation

Come, fellow Singaporeans
Let us progress towards happiness together
May our noble aspiration bring
Singapore success

𝄆 Come, let us unite
In a new spirit
Let our voices soar as one
𝄆 Onward Singapore 𝄇 𝄇

=== Original lyrics as the anthem of the City Council of Singapore ===
The original lyrics are as follows.

Original lyrics (pre-1972 Malay spelling)

Mari kită ra'yat Singapura,
Bangun dĕngan bĕrsatu samă-samă.
Rukon damai dan bantu mĕmbantu,
Supayă kită samă-samă maju.

Kită hidop aman dan sĕntosă,
Kĕrjă samă mĕnuju bahagiă !
Chită-chită kită yang muliă :
Bĕrjayă Singapura !

𝄆 Mari-lah kită bĕrsatu,
Dĕngan sĕmangat yang bahru.
Sămuă kită bĕrsĕru :
𝄆 Maju-lah Singapura ! 𝄇 𝄇

Original lyrics (1972 Malay spelling)

Mari kita rakyat Singapura
Bangun dengan bersatu sama-sama
Rukon damai dan bantu membantu
Supaya kita sama-sama maju

Kita hidup aman dan sentosa
Kerja sama menuju bahagia
Cita-cita kita yang mulia
Berjaya Singapura

𝄆 Marilah kita bersatu
Dengan semangat yang baru
Semua kita berseru
𝄆 Majulah Singapura 𝄇 𝄇

English translation

We, the people of Singapore
Renew life as one nation
With peace and effort
We move forward together

We live in peace and cooperation
To achieve happiness
Our noble aspiration
To make Singapore a success

𝄆 Let us all unite
In a new spirit
Together we proclaim
𝄆 Onward Singapore 𝄇 𝄇

In its original composition, an instrumental interlude of the first two verses follows the chorus of the song, then the chorus is sung twice to finish it. Zubir Said modified the song from there, as requested by Toh Chin Chye, by removing 8 bars starting from "Bangun dengan bersatu sama-sama..." to "...kerja sama menuju bahagia!" in order to bring forward the emphasis of the 8th line "Berjaya Singapura!". The move was also seen as making the anthem more neutral as the eight bars also contained subtle motives brought from Malay musical elements. Also, the interlude was removed in the national anthem version.

=== Translations ===
Interviewed by the Oral History Department in 1989, Toh Chin Chye said it was appropriate for the national anthem to be in Malay, "the indigenous language of the region, as English is not native to this part of the world." He felt that the "Malay version of the national anthem would appeal to all races... it can be easily understood. And at the same time [it] can be easily remembered... . [I]t must be brief, to the point;... and can be sung". However, on 22 July 1991, the English daily newspaper The Straits Times reported that during a meeting between the then Prime Minister Goh Chok Tong and community leaders, a group of grassroots leaders and a lawyer had suggested that "adjustments" be made to the national anthem. The given reason was that many Singaporeans were not able to sing in Malay and therefore not have "strong feelings" or "strong emotions when they sing the national anthem".

In particular, some grassroots leaders argued that since the Chinese constitute a majority of the population, a Mandarin version of the anthem should be used. The Prime Minister's response was that he would keep the national anthem as it was but would ensure that translations in other mother tongues were more easily available. The proposal to change the lyrics was also criticised by former Deputy Prime Minister S. Rajaratnam, who felt that the Malay lyrics of the anthem were so simple that "anyone over the age of five, unless mentally retarded, had no difficulty singing the anthem. All Singaporean children of kindergarten age have not only had no difficulty memorising the words but have for decades sung it every morning with 'strong feelings and emotion'." He also noted that the anthem had nevertheless already been translated into Singapore's three other official languages (English, Mandarin and Tamil) for those who cannot understand Malay.

In 1991, a poll of 35 people by The Straits Times found that while a majority of Singaporeans knew what the anthem generally meant, seven out of 35 persons interviewed knew the meaning of every word. However, all but three of those interviewed agreed that the anthem should continue to be sung in Malay. The three persons who disagreed felt that the anthem should be in English because that was the language most commonly used in Singapore. All the interviewees, including those who did not know the meaning of the lyrics, said they nevertheless felt a sense of pride and patriotism when they heard or sang the national anthem.

Singer Taufik Batisah was criticised for incorrectly singing the word berseru (to proclaim) instead of bersatu (to unite) during his rendition of "Majulah Singapura" before the start of the 2009 Formula 1 SingTel Singapore Grand Prix on 27 September 2009. A Straits Times poll then found that out of 50 people only 10 were able to sing the national anthem perfectly. Most people got between 80 and 90% of the lyrics right, while six could recite only the first line or less. Although many correctly stated that the title of the anthem meant "Onward Singapore", a majority did not understand the meaning of the anthem. However, most of the persons surveyed disagreed that the anthem should be in English, with one respondent saying: "It's better in Malay because there's a cultural history to it and [it] is more meaningful, and has traces to our roots."
