= Colony of Singapore =

British crown colony in Southeast Asia (1946–1959)

Colony of Singapore (1946–1959) State of Singapore (1959–1963)
- 1946–1963
- Top: Flag (1946–1959); Bottom: Flag (1959–1963) Top: Coat of arms (1946–1959); Bottom: Coat of arms (1959–1963)
- Motto: Dieu et mon droit (French) (1946–1959) (English: "God and my right"); Majulah Singapura (Malay) (1959–1963) (English: "Onward Singapore")
- Anthem: God Save the King (1946–1952); God Save the Queen (1952–1959) (Note: There is no authorised version of the national anthem as the words are a matter of tradition; only the first verse is usually sung. No law was passed making "God Save the King/Queen" the official anthem. In the English tradition, such laws are not necessary; proclamation and usage are sufficient to make it the national anthem. "God Save the King/Queen" also serves as the Royal anthem for certain Commonwealth realms. The words King, he, him, used at present (in the reign of Charles III), are replaced by Queen, she, her when the monarch is female.) Majulah Singapura (1959–1963) (English: "Onward Singapore")
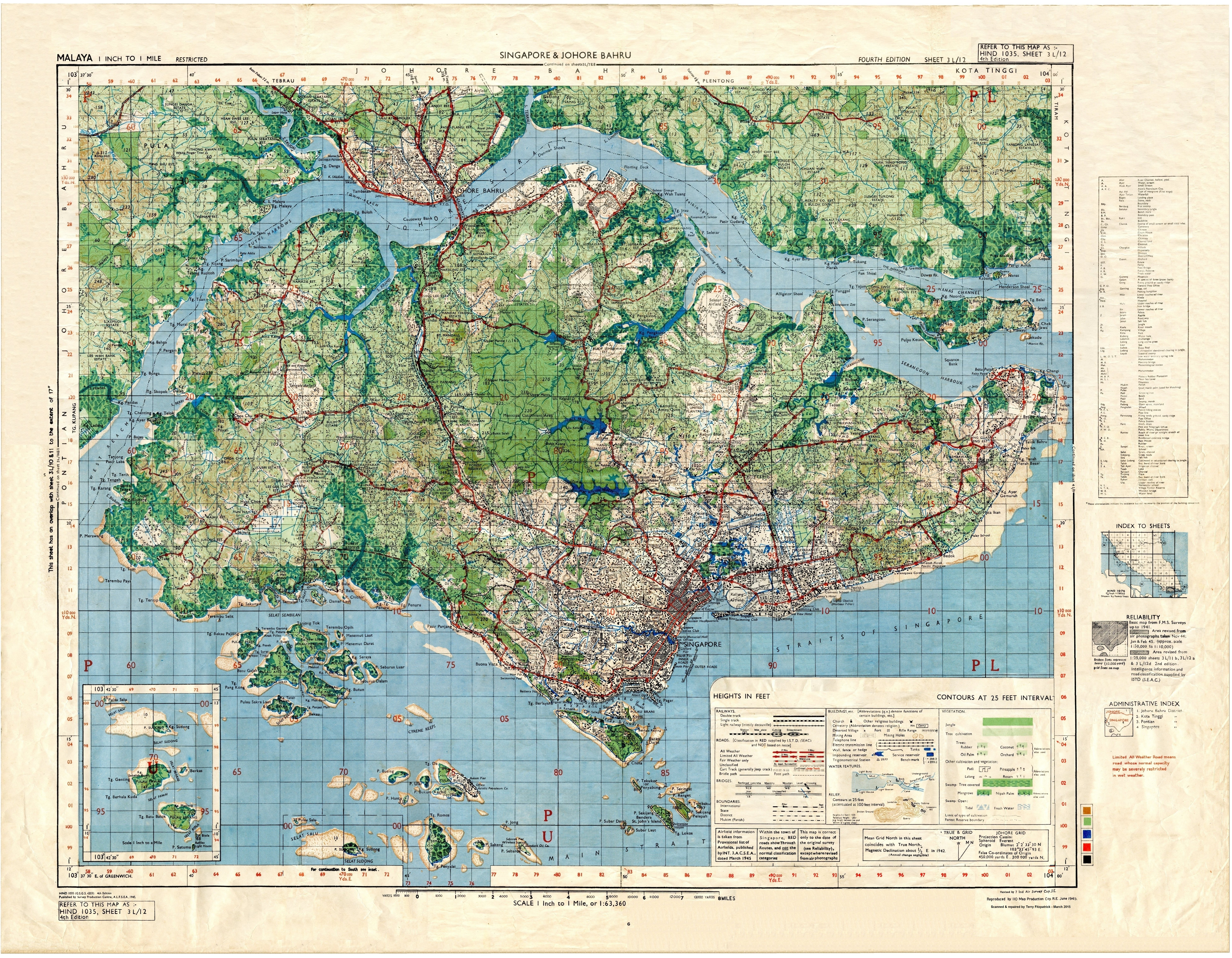
- Map of Singapore in 1945
- Status: Crown colony (1946–1959); Self-governing colony (1959–1963)
- Capital: City of Singapore; 1.30°N 103.85°E
- Official language and national language: English
- Common languages: Malay; Chinese; Tamil
- Government: Constitutional monarchy
- Monarch
  - 1946–1952: George VI
  - 1952–1963: Elizabeth II
- Governor^{[1]}
  - 1946–1952: Sir Franklin Gimson
  - 1952–1955: Sir John Fearns Nicoll
  - 1955–1957: Sir Robert Black
  - 1957–1959: Sir William Goode
  - 1959–1963: Yusof Ishak
- Chief Minister^{[2]}
  - 1955–1956: David Marshall
  - 1956–1959: Lim Yew Hock
  - 1959–1963: Lee Kuan Yew
- Legislature: Legislative Council (1946–1955); Legislative Assembly (1955–1963)
- Historical era: British Empire · Cold War
  - Dissolution of the Straits Settlements: 1 April 1946
  - Labuan transferred to North Borneo: 15 July 1946
  - The Colony of Singapore being conferred city status by King George VI: 22 September 1951
  - Cocos (Keeling) Islands transferred to Australia: 23 November 1955
  - Christmas Island transferred to Australia: 1 October 1958
  - Autonomy within the British Empire: 3 June 1959
  - Merger with the Federation of Malaysia: 16 September 1963

Area
- 1960: 581.5 (Note: Excluding Christmas Island, the Cocos (Keeling) Islands, and Labuan.) km^{2} (224.5 sq mi)
- Currency: British Malayan Dollar (1946–1953); Malaya and British Borneo dollar (1953–1963)
- Time zone: UTC+07:30 (Malaya Standard Time)
- Date format: dd-mm-yyyy
Preceded by
British Military Administration (Malaya)
Straits Settlements
∟Singapore (Straits Settlements)
Succeeded by
State of Singapore (Malaysia)
Crown Colony of North Borneo
Cocos (Keeling) Islands
Christmas Island
- Today part of: Singapore; Australia; Malaysia
- Notes: 1. Succeeded by the office of Yang di-Pertuan Negara in 1959.; 2. Succeeded by the office of Prime Minister in 1959.

The Colony of Singapore was a Crown colony of the United Kingdom that encompassed what is modern-day Singapore from 1946 to 1959. During this period, Christmas Island, the Cocos (Keeling) Islands, and Labuan were also administered from Singapore. Singapore had previously been established as a British colony since 1824, and had been governed as part of the Straits Settlements since 1826. The colony was created when the Straits Settlements was dissolved shortly after the Japanese occupation of Singapore ended in 1945. The power of the British Government was vested in the governor of Singapore. The colony eventually gained partial internal self-governance in 1955, and lasted until the establishment of the State of Singapore in 1958, with full internal self-governance granted in 1959.

After a few years of self-governance, Singapore went on to merge with Malaya, Sarawak and North Borneo (Sabah) to form Malaysia on 16 September 1963, thereby completely ending 144 years of British rule in Singapore. Due to differing views in dealing with political, economic and racial issues, Singapore would eventually cease to be a part of Malaysia and become an independent sovereign country on 9 August 1965.

== History ==
=== Post war period: Return of British rule ===
After the Empire of Japan surrendered to the Allies on 15 August 1945, there was a state of anomie in Singapore, as the British had not yet arrived to take control, while the Japanese occupiers had a considerably weakened hold over the populace. Incidents of looting and revenge killing were widespread.

When British troops returned to Singapore in September 1945, thousands of Singaporeans lined the streets to cheer them. Singapore was ruled by a British Military Administration (BMA) between September 1945 and March 1946, during which it also served as the headquarters of the British governor-general for Southeast Asia. However, much of the infrastructure had been destroyed, including electricity and water supply systems, telephone services, and the harbour facilities at the Port of Singapore.

There was also a shortage of food, including rice, and this led to malnutrition, disease, and rampant crime and violence. Unemployment, high food prices, and workers' discontent culminated in a series of strikes in 1947 causing massive stoppages in public transport and other services. By late 1947 the economy began to recover, facilitated by the growing demand for tin and rubber around the world. Several more years elapsed before the economy returned to pre-war levels.

=== From colony to state ===
On 1 April 1946, the Straits Settlements was dissolved and Singapore became a Crown Colony with a civil administration headed by a Governor and separated from peninsular Malaya. In July 1947, separate Executive and Legislative Councils were established and provisions were made to allow for the election of six members of the Legislative Council the next year. On 30 November 1959, the Singapore State Arms and Flag and National Anthem Ordinance 1959 was passed to regulate the use and display of the State Arms, State Flag and the performance of the National Anthem.

=== Merger with Malaysia ===
The failure of the British to defend Singapore had destroyed their credibility as infallible rulers in the eyes of the locals in Singapore. The decades after and during the war saw a political awakening amongst the local populace and the rise of nationalist and anti-colonial sentiments, including a cry for Merdeka ("independence" in the Malay language). The British were also prepared to embark on a programme of gradually increasing self-governance for Singapore and Malaya. On 16 September 1963, Singapore became a state of Malaysia, completely ending 144 years of British rule.

=== Independence ===
On 9 August 1965, Singapore officially left Malaysia to become the independent Republic of Singapore, due to political, economic and racial disputes.

== Government ==
=== First Legislative Council (1948–1951) ===
The first Singaporean elections, held in March 1948 to select members of the Legislative Council, were rather limited. The right to vote was restricted to adult British subjects, of which only 23,000 or about 10 percent of those eligible registered to vote. In addition, only six of the twenty-five seats on the Legislative Council were to be elected; the rest were chosen either by the Governor or by the chambers of commerce.

Three of the elected seats were won by a newly formed Singapore Progressive Party (SPP), a conservative party whose leaders were businessmen and professionals and were disinclined to press for immediate self-rule. The other three seats were won by independents.

Three months after the elections, an armed insurgency by communist groups in Malaya – the Malayan Emergency – broke out, and the British imposed harsh measures to control left-wing groups in both Singapore and Malaya; the controversial Internal Security Act, which allowed indefinite detention without trial for persons suspected of being "threats to security", was introduced at this time.

Since the left-wing groups were the strongest critics of the colonial system, progress on self-government stalled for several years. The colonial government also tried to prevent contacts between Singaporean Chinese and China, which had just fallen under the rule of the Chinese Communist Party. Tan Kah Kee, a local businessman and philanthropist, was denied re-entry into Singapore after he made a trip to China.

=== Second Legislative Council (1951–1955) ===
A second Legislative Council election was held in 1951 with the number of elected seats increased to nine. This election was again dominated by the SPP which won six seats. This slowly contributed to the formation of a distinct government of Singapore, although colonial administration was still dominant.

In 1953, with the communists in Malaya suppressed and the worst of the 'Emergency' period over, the government appointed a commission, headed by Sir George Rendel, to study the possibility of self-government for Singapore. The commission proposed a limited form of self-government.

The Legislative Assembly with twenty-five out of thirty-two seats chosen by popular election would replace the Legislative Council, from which a Chief Minister as head of government and Council of Ministers as a cabinet would be picked under a parliamentary system. The British would retain control over areas such as internal security and foreign affairs, as well as veto power over legislation.

The government agreed with the recommendations, and Legislative Assembly elections were scheduled for 2 April 1955. The election was a lively and closely fought affair, with several newly formed political parties joining the fray. In contrast to previous elections, voters were automatically registered, expanding the electorate to around 300,000. The SPP was soundly defeated in the election, winning only four seats. The newly formed, left-leaning Labour Front was the largest winner with ten seats and was able to form a coalition government with the UMNO–MCA–MU, which won three seats. Another new party, the then leftist People's Action Party (PAP), won three seats.

== Administration ==
On 1 April 1946, the Colony of Singapore was formed with Cocos-Keeling, Christmas Island after the dissolution of the Straits Settlements. As a Crown colony, Singapore inherited the hierarchical organisational structure of the Straits Settlements government with a governor, who was assisted by an Advisory Executive Council, a Legislative Council and a Municipal Council. In July 1946, Labuan became part of the Crown Colony of North Borneo. The sovereignty of the Cocos (Keeling) Islands was transferred to Australia in 1955. The administration of Christmas Island was also transferred to Australia in 1958.

== Governors of Singapore (1946–1959) ==
The Governors of Singapore ruled the Crown Colony of Singapore from 1946 to 1959, on behalf of the Colonial Office. When Singapore gained self-governance in 1959, the Office of the Governor was abolished.

#	Governor of Singapore	Term of office	
#	Governor of Singapore	Took office	Left office
1	Sir Franklin Gimson, KCMG KStJ	1 April 1946	20 March 1952
–	Wilfred Lawson Blythe, CMG (Acting)	20 March 1952	1 April 1952
2	Sir John Nicoll, KCMG KStJ	21 April 1952	2 June 1955
–	Sir William Goode, GCMG KStJ (Acting)	2 June 1955	30 June 1955
3	Sir Robert Black, GCMG OBE	30 June 1955	9 December 1957
4	Sir William Goode, GCMG, KStJ	9 December 1957	3 June 1959
