= National Pledge (Singapore) =

Oath of allegiance to Singapore

Singapore National Pledge

February 1966 (first version)
- “We, as citizens of Singapore, pledge ourselves to forget differences of race, language or religion and become one united people; to build a democratic society where justice and equality will prevail and where we will seek happiness and progress by helping one another.”

August 1966 (current version, per Constitution of Singapore)
- "We, the citizens of Singapore, pledge ourselves as one united people, regardless of race, language or religion, to build a democratic society based on justice and equality so as to achieve happiness, prosperity and progress for our nation."

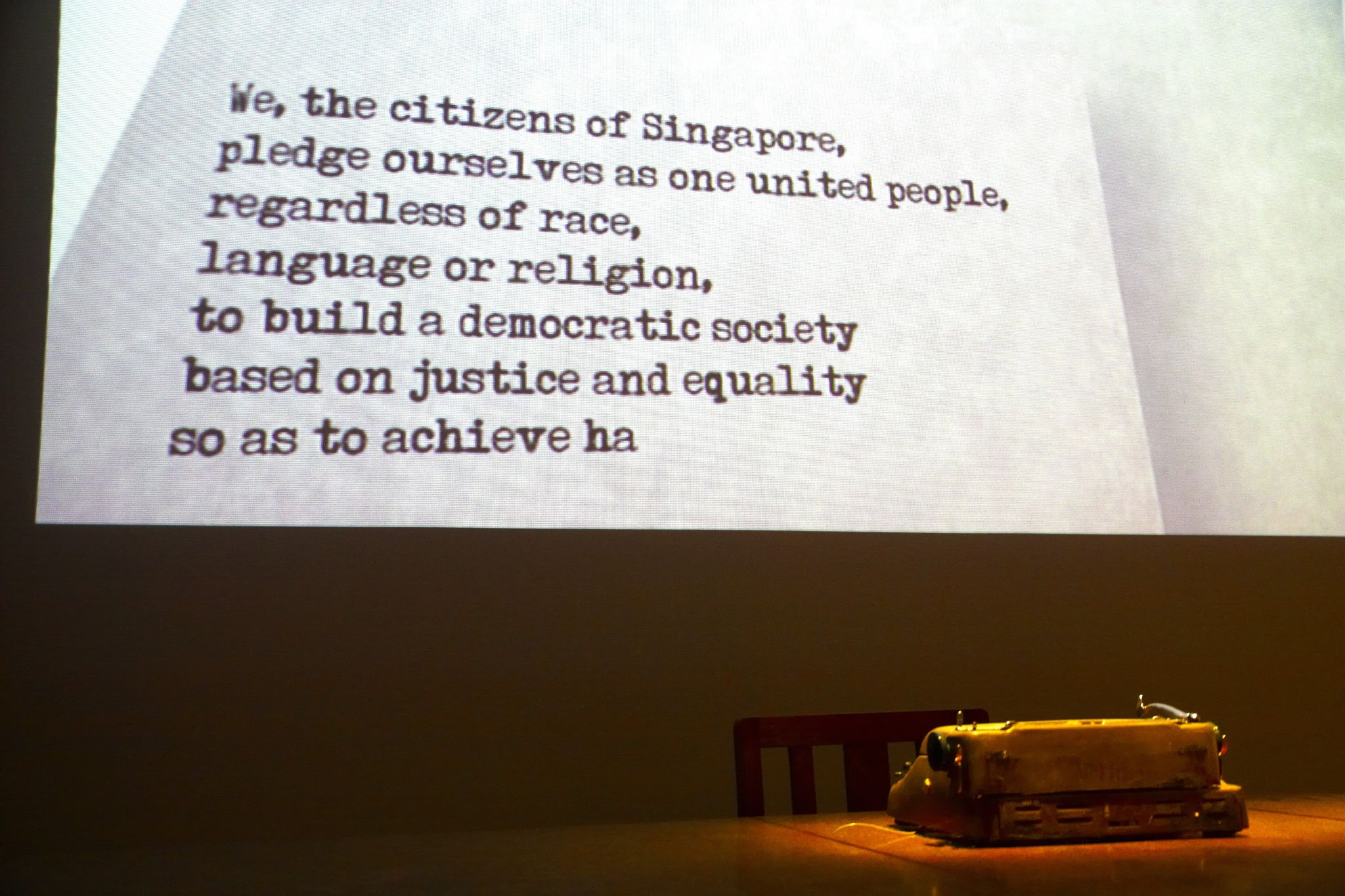
An animated display at the National Museum of Singapore featuring a portion of the National Pledge. The remainder of the Pledge, which does not appear in the photograph, is "... so as to achieve happiness, prosperity and progress for our nation".

The National Pledge is an oath of allegiance to the Republic of Singapore. It is commonly recited by Singaporeans in unison at public events, especially in schools, in the Singapore Armed Forces and during the National Day Parade.

== Origin ==
The National Pledge was written by S. Rajaratnam in 1966 shortly after Singapore's independence. Rajaratnam revealed that the dream was to build "a Singapore we are proud of". He believed that language, race and religion were divisive factors, but the Pledge emphasises that these differences can be overcome if Singaporeans cared enough about their country. The draft text was handed to the then Prime Minister Lee Kuan Yew, who polished the text before submitting it to the Cabinet. The finalised pledge was first recited on 24 August 1966 by students of all state schools.

== Guidelines for usage ==
The Singapore government's guidelines for the use of the pledge are:

1. The National Pledge is recited in schools on all school days, either in the morning or afternoon, during SAF Day, during the National Day Parade, and at National Day Observance Ceremonies.
2. Individuals reciting the Pledge shall clench their right fists to the left side of their chests as a gesture to symbolise loyalty to the nation.
3. When taking the National Pledge, individuals should recite the National Pledge in full.
4. The National Pledge should not be used for any commercial purpose unless prior approval is given.
5. The National Pledge should not be used in a disrespectful manner.

== See also ==
- Declaration of Religious Harmony
