= 1964 race riots in Singapore =

- Part of the Konfrontasi and Cold War in Asia
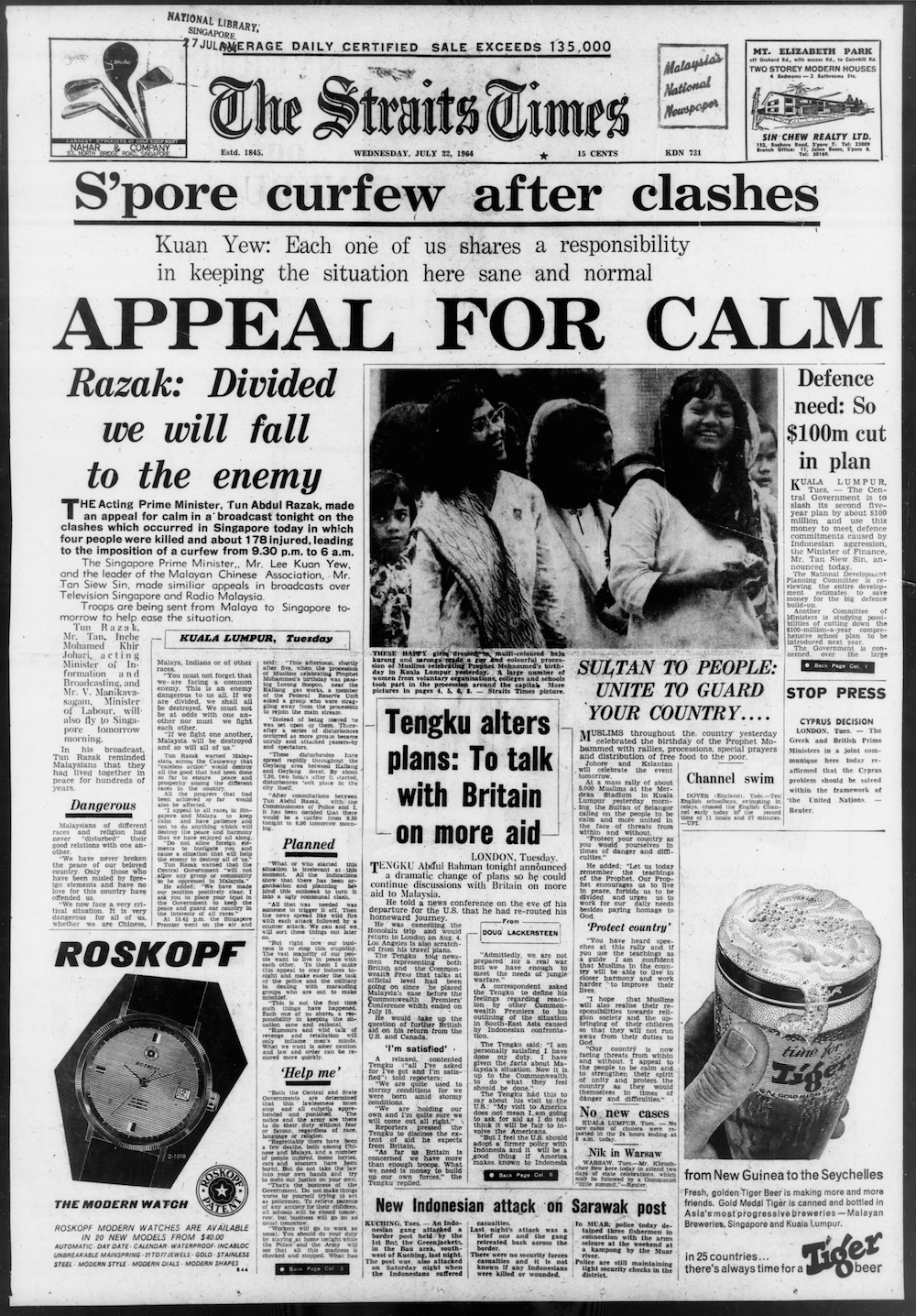
- The Straits Times on 22 July 1964, reporting on the riots the day earlier and the imposition of a curfew
- Date: 21 July 1964; 62 years ago 2 September 1964; 62 years ago
- Location: Kallang, Geylang and various districts in Singapore, Malaysia
- Caused by: Political and religious tensions between ethnic Chinese and Malay groups
- Methods: Widespread rioting, looting, assault, arson, protests, property damage, murder
- Result: Islandwide curfew imposed from 21 July 1964 to 2 August 1964 in the aftermath of the July riots; Islandwide curfew imposed from 4 September 1964 to 11 September 1964 in the aftermath of the September riots; Temporary establishment of the Commission of Inquiry team; Indirectly led to the independence of Singapore the following year on 9 August; Establishment of Article 12 of the Singapore Constitution after its independence; Annual commemoration of Racial Harmony Day on 21 July since 1997 to mark the day of the July riots

Parties
Chinese community of Singapore Supported by: Malayan Communist Party (disputed, alleged by the federal government)	Malay community of Singapore Supported by: Right-wing Malay extremists: United Malays National Organisation (Ultras faction); Singapore Malay National Organisation Indonesia (disputed, alleged by the federal government)	Commission of inquiry: Government of Singapore; Malaysian Ministry of Home Affairs; Malaysian Special Branch Riot control: Royal Malaysia Police; Singapore Police Force: Malaysian Army; 1st Battalion – Malaysian Infantry Regiment (1 MIR); Political involvement: People's Action Party (state government): Alliance Party (federal government, including through its local branch); United Malays National Organisation (Moderate faction); Malaysian Chinese Association; Malaysian Indian Congress

Lead figures
No centralised leadership	Syed Jaafar Albar; Mahathir Mohamad; Musa Hitam; Syed Esa Almenoar	Yusof Ishak; Lee Kuan Yew; Tunku Abdul Rahman; Abdul Razak Hussein; Ismail Abdul Rahman; Commissioner John Le Cain, SPF; Platoon Commander Winston Choo, 1 MIR

Casualties and arrests
- Deaths: 23 (July riots); 13 (September riots)
- Injuries: 454 (July riots); 106 (September riots)
- Arrested: 3,568 (July riots); 1,439 (September riots)
- Detained: 945 (July riots); 268 (September riots)
- Charged: 715 (July riots); 154 (September riots)

The 1964 race riots in Singapore were a series of communal disturbances and racial conflicts between the Malay and Chinese communities in Singapore. They occurred just months after Singapore's merger with Malaysia on 16 September 1963 and were regarded as the most serious and prolonged racial violence in the nation's post-war history. Although 1964 was marked by general racial tension, the term specifically refers to two major outbreaks on 21 July and 2 September, particularly the former, which was more severe and resulted in 23 deaths and 454 injuries.

The riots had significant political consequences and raised concerns about Malaysia's racial stability following Singapore's inclusion. Around this period, secret negotiations were initiated between the Malaysian federal government and the Singaporean state government on the possibility of separation. The events were later regarded as pivotal in leading to the independence of Singapore in 1965, shaping its national policies of multiracialism and multiculturalism. It also provided continued justification for laws such as the Internal Security Act (ISA) to monitor and curb potential incitement of racial or religious hostility.

In 1997, Racial Harmony Day was established to encourage racial and ethnic harmony among Singaporeans, especially through schools and grassroots organisations. It is observed on 21 July, marking the anniversary of the most severe riot in 1964.

== Background ==
=== Political context ===
On 16 September 1963, Singapore merged with Malaysia to form a single federation that was motivated by economic and security considerations. The move was intended to counter the spread of communism in Southeast Asia and to give Singapore access to Malaya's natural resources and domestic market. In addition, Singapore had gained full internal self-government following the 1959 Singaporean general election, although the United Kingdom continued to manage its external affairs. The proposed merger was therefore seen as a path for Singapore to achieve complete independence from British control. Meanwhile, the Federation of Malaya had already attained full sovereignty from Britain on 31 August 1957 through the Malayan Declaration of Independence.

Malaya's Prime Minister at the time, Tunku Abdul Rahman, had initially rejected Prime Minister of Singapore Lee Kuan Yew's proposal for merger, fearing that it would strengthen the communist movement backed by the Malayan Communist Party (MCP) and that the majority ethnic Chinese in Singapore would upset Malaya's racial balance, reducing the Malay population further. At that time, the Malay population in Malaya stood at around 45%. The Malayan Chinese, who are ethnic Chinese living in Malaya rather than in Singapore, had already made up a significant portion of its population prior to the merger. They remain an important community today, although their proportion of the total population in modern-day Malaysia has gradually declined since the 1960s.

Tunku eventually changed his stance and became supportive of a merger with Singapore after the anti-communist Singaporean leader Ong Eng Guan, who had previously been expelled from the People's Action Party (PAP), went on to win a by-election as an independent in 1961. This convinced Tunku that the communists did not hold decisive influence or broad support among the Singaporean Chinese. The Malayan government, however, remained concerned about the PAP's stability, fearing that its collapse could create a power vacuum that the communists might exploit by using Singapore as a base to spread their ideology into Malaya. Furthermore, maintaining a Malay or indigenous majority after a merger was made possible through the inclusion of the former British territories of Sabah and Sarawak in the federation, even though the native populations there were not ethnically Malay. Together, the Malays and the indigenous peoples of East Malaysia came to be collectively referred to as the Bumiputera in modern-day Malaysia.

=== Ideological differences: PAP vs. UMNO ===
The PAP, Singapore's ruling political party, and the Alliance Party, Malaysia's governing coalition led by UMNO, held sharply contrasting political ideologies. Under Lee Kuan Yew, the PAP advocated a non-communal approach that emphasised equality for all citizens regardless of race or religion. In contrast, UMNO, led by Tunku Abdul Rahman, promoted policies granting special rights and privileges to the Bumiputeras, regarded as "indigenous" to Malaysia. This was presented as a form of affirmative action for the majority to address the economic disparity faced by Malays compared to the more affluent minority ethnic Chinese population, one that had its roots in the divide and rule practices of the British colonial administration. To maintain stability, a tacit agreement was reached in which Tunku assured Lee that the Alliance would stay out of Singapore's domestic politics as long as the PAP restricted its political activities to the island.

Despite this prior understanding, the Singapore branch of UMNO contested the island's 1963 state general election, standing in three constituencies with large Malay electorates. Meanwhile, the Singapore Alliance Party, supported by its federal counterpart, also fielded 42 candidates in the election. However, the coalition failed to win a single seat and received limited support from the local Malay Singaporean community. Conversely, the PAP secured 37 out of 51 seats, a result that further strained relations between the two.

Lee intensified his call for a "Malaysian Malaysia" and sought to transform the PAP into a political party representing the whole of Malaysia rather than only Singapore. After the breakdown of the political truce, the PAP fielded nine candidates in the 1964 federal general election on 25 April and won a single seat at Bangsar in Selangor, which UMNO leaders viewed as an intrusion into Malaysia's political arena and a personal humiliation for the Tunku. Lee's vision of a Malaysian Malaysia was met with suspicion and hostility by UMNO as they saw it as a challenge to Malay political dominance. In retaliation, UMNO and its allies escalated an anti-PAP propaganda campaign through newspapers and political rallies to weaken the party's influence and win support from the Malay Singaporean community, deepening tensions that would later culminate to these communal riots.

== Riots of July 1964 ==
=== Events leading up to the outbreak of the July riots ===
The official state narrative regarding the cause of the riots of 21 July attributes a significant instigating role to UMNO and the Malay-language newspaper Utusan Melayu, which was under UMNO's influence. According to this view, both the party and the newspaper fuelled anti-PAP sentiment among the local Malay population through inflammatory headlines and repeated criticisms of the PAP. Founded in 1939 by Yusof Ishak, Utusan Melayu was originally a more moderate publication, describing its mission as one to "fight for religion, race and its homeland," with particular emphasis on defending Malay rights and status. However, after the 1959 election that brought the PAP to power in Singapore, the newspaper increasingly adopted a confrontational tone, including portraying the state government's eviction of Malay residents from the Crawford area for urban redevelopment as discrimination against Malays. It failed to report, however, that Chinese and other non-Malay residents were also relocated as part of the same redevelopment programme.

To address Malay grievances, Lee Kuan Yew convened a public meeting with various Malay organisations on 19 July at the Victoria Theatre and Concert Hall. UMNO was angered at being excluded from this meeting. During the discussion, Lee assured the local Malays that they would be given opportunities in education, employment and skills training to help them compete effectively with the non-Malays in Singapore. However, he declined to promise the granting of "special rights for the Malays". While this meeting satisfied some Malay community leaders, it also provoked discontent among more hardline and right-wing factions who felt that Malay concerns were not being sufficiently addressed. The local branch of UMNO, the Singapore Malay National Organisation (SMNO), remained unconvinced of Lee's assurances. In an effort to rally Malay opposition against the PAP government, leaflets spreading false rumours that the Chinese were planning to "kill" Malays were circulated across the island on 20 July. The dissemination of such misinformation continued during the Mawlid procession, contributing to the outbreak of the riots.

In retaliation and to further inflame tensions between the Malays and the PAP, UMNO organised its own meeting attended by around 12,000 people. The event was chaired by UMNO Secretary-General Syed Jaafar Albar, who referred to Lee as an "Ikan Sepat" (three spot gourami), a mud-dwelling fish, and called for collective action against the local Chinese allegedly led by the PAP. While this meeting was underway, racial tensions were already at a breaking point in Malaysia. Communal violence had broken out in Bukit Mertajam in Penang, resulting in two deaths. This incident was regarded as a precursor to the larger riots that broke out on 21 July in Singapore.

Othman Wok wrote in his autobiography that a reporter from the Utusan Melayu had told him about the potential riots even before they occurred, which led to official suspicions that UMNO leaders might have been involved in orchestrating the unrest. Othman also recounted several key political meetings held between Malay community representatives and Singaporean politicians to convey their concerns. Accounts from these meetings suggested that the Malays in Singapore had no significant grievances, and that Syed Jaafar was responsible for instigating unrest. The issues raised by the Malay community mainly concerned infrastructural problems in Malay schools, which contradicted the claims made by UMNO and the Utusan Melayu.

=== Origins of the July riots ===
The origins of the July riots remain a subject of debate, with differing interpretations offered by various parties.

Officially, the United Malays National Organisation (UMNO) and the Malaysian federal government attributed the unrest to provocateurs from Indonesia who were alleged to have incited tensions among Malay communities in the kampong areas. This claim was dismissed by W. A. Luscombe, the Second Secretary of the Australian High Commission in Kuala Lumpur, who noted the absence of supporting evidence.

Privately, however, Malaysian officials held Lee Kuan Yew and the People's Action Party (PAP) responsible for aggravating discontent among the Malays in Singapore. UMNO leaders, including Tun Abdul Razak, accused Lee of provoking hostility through his speech on 30 June, which they claimed contained inflammatory criticism of UMNO's communal politics. The United States Embassy, however, challenged this account, suggesting that the Utusan Melayu newspaper may have misrepresented Lee's remarks.

Conversely, the PAP maintained that the July 1964 riots were not spontaneous. Lee argued that UMNO had deliberately sought to incite anti-PAP sentiment among Singapore's Malays through communal rhetoric and by using Utusan Melayu to spread pro-Malay narratives aimed at deepening racial divisions. He believed the intention was to provoke violence in Singapore, creating a pretext for UMNO to justify stronger measures against him and the PAP and thereby tightening control over the political situation.

=== Outbreak of the July riots ===
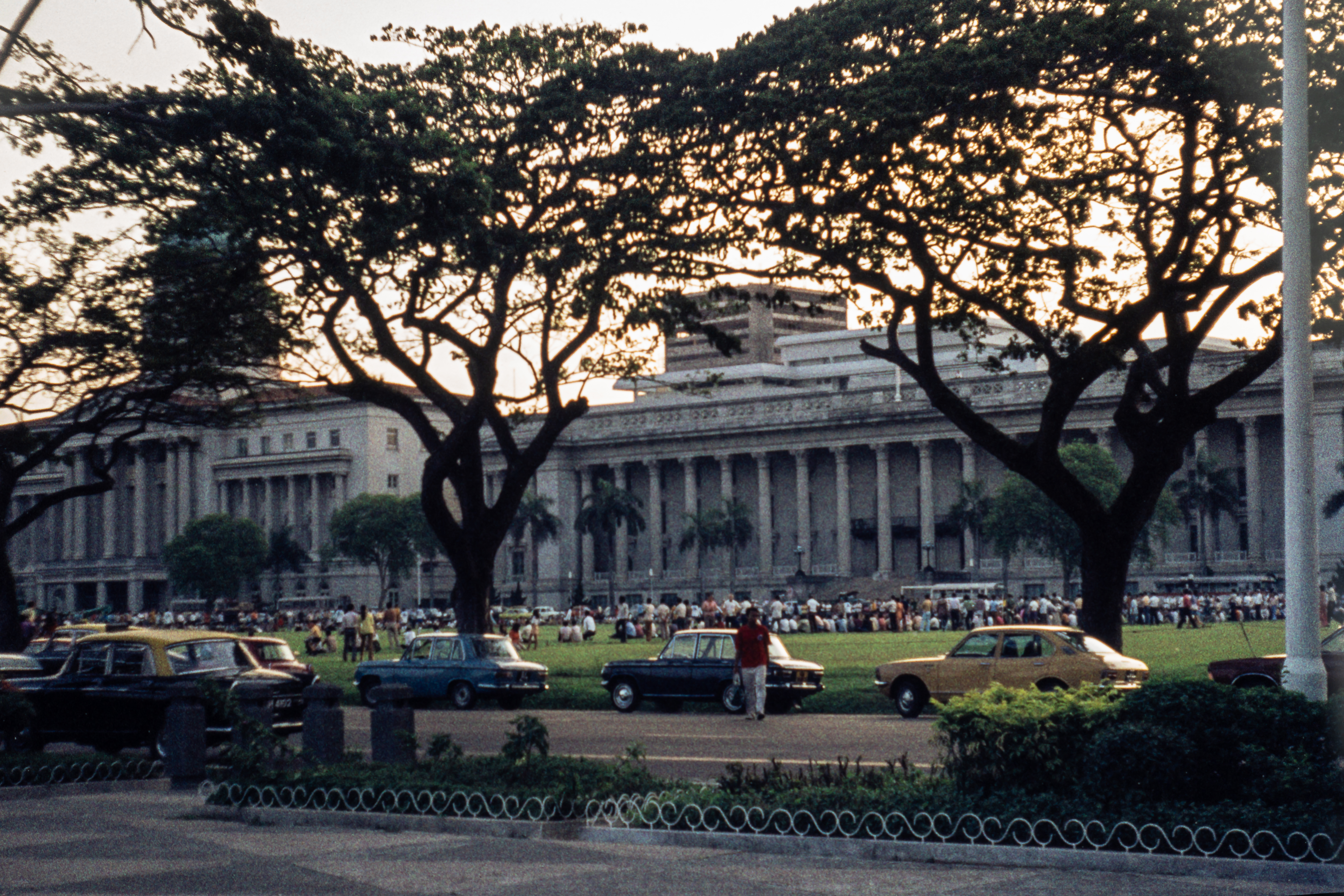
The Padang in 1973

The first major riot of 1964 took place at the Padang on 21 July during a Mawlid procession celebrating the birthday of the Islamic prophet Muhammad. Around 20,000 people, mostly Muslims, had gathered for prayers and religious observances that afternoon, though the event also featured a series of fiery and provocative speeches by the organisers. The procession started at the Padang and was planned to end at the Jamiyah Headquarters located in Geylang. During the procession, a glass bottle was thrown into the crowd and struck a participant on the head, triggering violent clashes between members of the crowd and nearby bystanders, many of whom were Chinese or non-Muslim. The unrest quickly spread to other areas, escalating as more objects were thrown and fights broke out. In response, the entire local police force was activated alongside the Malaysian Infantry Regiment (MIR), with tear gas deployed to disperse rioters and an island-wide curfew imposed. Multiple accounts exist regarding the incident and the exact circumstances that led to the outbreak of violence remain disputed.

The UMNO narrative of the July 1964 riots, as reflected in public forums and history textbooks, is often simplified as an incident involving thousands of Chinese "throwing bottles and rocks" at the Malays at the Padang. In reality, scholars have disputed this portrayal, arguing that the clash with a Malay policeman who tried to restrain the Malays was not the root cause of the riots. Instead, one factor contributing to the violence may have been the distribution of inflammatory leaflets to the Malay community before the start of the procession by the SMNO. These leaflets incited anti-Chinese and anti-PAP sentiment among the Malays by calling for a united front to "wipe out" the Chinese, who were accused of plotting to harm the Malay community. The Secretary-General of SMNO, Syed Esa Almenoar, also delivered a provocative political speech urging Malays to fight for their rights instead of the expected religious address.

The procession itself was led by the Yang di-Pertuan Negara Yusof Ishak and several PAP leaders, including Othman Wok. The route passed through Arab Street, Kallang and Geylang. The violence broke out at around 17:00, when several Malay youths were seen assaulting a Chinese cyclist along Victoria Street, an act that drew intervention from a Chinese constable. Othman later recalled in his autobiography that while he and his team were already close to the Jamiyah Headquarters, a group of youths believed to be affiliated with UMNO shouted "strike the Chinese" as they marched ahead of his contingent. The riots quickly spread from Bugis and Geylang and to other parts of Singapore, including at Palmer Road at Tanjong Pagar and Madras Street at Little India. The police, military and the Gurkha Contingent were deployed to control the violence. By 21:00, a curfew was imposed across the island, ordering all residents to remain indoors.

The riots resulted in extensive property damage, injuries and loss of life. Initial police reports recorded 220 separate incidents, with four deaths and 178 people injured. Around 20 Chinese-owned shophouses in Geylang and Eunos areas were destroyed by fire. The curfew was lifted at 06:00 on 22 July, but renewed clashes later that morning led to its reimposition at 11:30. Political leaders from both Malaysia and Singapore, including the Tunku and Lee, made national radio broadcasts urging citizens to remain calm and maintain harmony among the various racial and religious communities. By 24 July, the number of communal incidents had fallen to seven, and on 2 August, the curfew was fully lifted as order was restored under close police and military supervision.

== Riots of September 1964 ==
Following the July riots, a brief period of calm in August was disrupted by another outbreak of racial violence on 2 September. This riot was sparked by the murder of a Malay trishaw rider along Geylang Serai, which triggered retaliatory stabbings and widespread attacks. Thirteen people were killed, 106 were injured and 1,439 were arrested in the ensuing unrest. An island-wide curfew was subsequently re-established from 4 to 11 September.

The authorities officially accused Indonesia of attempting to incite communal discord in both Malaysia and Singapore, coinciding with the landing of Indonesian commandos in nearby Johor Bahru. However, this claim was deemed highly unlikely by the American Ambassador to Singapore, who attributed the renewed violence to lingering domestic tensions from the July riots rather than foreign interference.

Despite this, Indonesia's involvement in acts of sabotage within Singapore were not unfounded. A few months after the riots, Indonesian operatives carried out the MacDonald House bombing, which resulted in the deaths of three people and injuries to 33 others.

== Aftermath ==
=== Commission of Inquiry ===
Following the July riots, the Singaporean state government requested that the Malaysian federal government establish a Commission of Inquiry (COI) to investigate the underlying causes of the violence. This request was initially rejected. However, after the outbreak of the September riots, the federal government agreed to establish such a commission, which began holding closed-door hearings in April 1965. The report produced by the commission has never been made public, and its findings have largely been kept confidential and sidelined.

=== Singapore's separation from Malaysia ===
According to Lee Kuan Yew, irreconcilable differences existed between the governments of Singapore and Malaysia from the outset, primarily due to divergent approaches to racial politics. The racial riots of July 1964 deepened the political rift between the PAP and UMNO, leading moderates from both sides to begin secret discussions on a looser confederation or even separation. Tunku Abdul Rahman's also frequently centered his speeches on communal politics and accused Lee and the PAP of meddling in Malaysian affairs by promoting non-communal policies. At the same time, extremists within UMNO encouraged racial tension and anti-PAP sentiment among Singapore's Malays, further straining relations. These ideological differences and the communal unrest of 1964 were key factors contributing to Singapore's eventual separation from Malaysia, culminating in its declaration as an independent and sovereign state on 9 August 1965.

=== Principles of multiculturalism and multiracialism ===
The racial riots of the 1960s played a significant role in shaping some of Singapore's fundamental principles such as multiculturalism and multiracialism once it had gained independence from Malaysia in 1965. The Singapore Constitution emphasised the need to adopt non-discriminatory policies based on race or religion. Furthermore, the state also guaranteed the grant of minority rights and to ensure that the minorities in Singapore are not mistreated; the Presidential Council for Minority Rights (PCMR) was established in 1970 to ensure that the bills passed by the parliament are not discriminatory against any racial group, while the Maintenance of Religious Harmony Act was drafted and implemented in 1990 to prevent inter-religious conflict.

The government has used the recollection of the 1964 race riots to frame the national narrative of "rising from the ashes of violence-producing racial and religious acrimony to religious harmony and civil peace". In 1997, educational initiatives such as National Education (NE) and the annual Racial Harmony Day on 21 July were introduced to remind the younger generations of the riots' consequences and to promote inter-ethnic respect and cohesion.

=== Internal Security Act ===
Since the riots of the 1960s, Singapore has maintained strict domestic security measures over the decades to prevent the recurrence of communal violence. The Internal Security Act (ISA), which originated under British colonial rule and was retained after independence, grants the government the authority to detain individuals without trial if their actions are deemed a threat to national security or public order.

The law empowers the authorities to act against persons who engage in activities that "promote feelings of ill-will and hostility between different races or other classes of the population likely to cause violence." It has since been used as both a preventive and deterrent tool to curb racial and religious extremism, subversive acts and other conduct considered detrimental to the country's stability and social cohesion.

Examples in the 2020s include the Singapore mosque attacks plot in 2021, in which a self-radicalised teenager was detained under the Act for planning to carry out attacks on two mosques in Singapore inspired by the 2019 Christchurch mosque shootings. Conversely, in 2024, another self-radicalised teenager who supported ISIS was detained under the same law after planning to attack and kill non-Muslims in Tampines, motivated by extremist religious beliefs.

== See also ==
- 1950 Maria Hertogh riots
- 1969 race riots of Singapore
- 13 May 1969 incident
- List of riots in Singapore
