= 1967 Singaporean presidential election =

- 30 November 1967
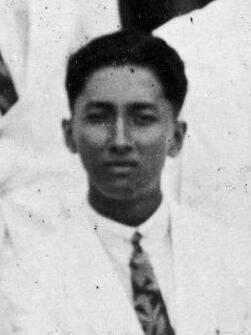
Nominee	Yusof Ishak
Party	Independent
Electoral vote	47
President before election
Yusof Ishak
Independent
Elected President
Yusof Ishak
Independent

Indirect presidential elections were held in Singapore on 30 November 1967. This was the first presidential election held in Singapore since the country's independence in 1965. Under the constitution at the time, the president was elected by parliament. Prime minister Lee Kuan Yew nominated incumbent president Yusof Ishak for the presidency, which was met with unanimous agreement by parliament. He was sworn in on 4 December.

== Background ==
The office of the president of Singapore is the head of state of Singapore. It was established in 1965 following Singapore's independence from Malaysia, replacing the Yang di-Pertuan Negara. The role of the president is largely ceremonial, but at the time the president could assent laws and give discretion to the appointment of the prime minister or dissolution of the Legislative Assembly. The term of president was four years. Prior to the 1991 constitutional amendment, which saw the president elected by popular vote, the president was elected by parliament. This was the first presidential election in Singapore.

== Candidates ==
The incumbent Yang di-Pertuan Negara, journalist Yusof Ishak, served as such since 1959 after succeeding Sir William Goode. In that role, he represented the British monarchy from 1959 to 1963, and later the Yang di-Pertuan Agong of Malaysia from 1963 to 1965. Following Singapore's independence, the Constitution (Amendment) Bill was passed that allowed him to transition from his role as Yang di-Pertuan Negara into the president of Singapore. This bill considered Yusof's presidency to have begun on 4 December 1963.

== Results ==
The first presidential election was held on 30 November 1967 at Parliament House. Prime minister Lee Kuan Yew nominated Yusof before parliament for a four-year term as president. Lee spoke about his confidence in Yusof and "that he will execute the duties of his high office with the same dignity, willingness, and cheerfulness with which he first undertook them". Following this, members of parliament (MP) Rahmat bin Kenap, Lim Guan Hoo, and S. Ramaswamy voiced their support in their native tongues; Malay, Chinese, and Tamil, respectively.

On that day's sitting, 47 out of the 51 MPs were present, with four members absent. (Note: The MPs absent were Chan Sun Wing, Fong Sip Chee, Ho Kah Leong, and Wong Soon Fong.) Parliament voted unanimously via voice vote to elect him as president. Following his successful election, Yusof was sworn in as president on 4 December 1967. He received congratulations from French president Charles de Gaulle, Swiss president Roger Bonvin, Indian president Zakir Husain, Pakistani president Ayub Khan, and Shah of Iran Mohammad Reza Pahlavi on his election.

Candidate	Party	Votes	%
Yusof Ishak	Independent	47	100.00
Total		47	100.00
Total votes		47	–
Registered voters/turnout		51	92.16
