= Padang Gajah =

Village in Larut, Matang and Selama, Perak, Malaysia

- Village
- Country: Malaysia
- State: Perak

Padang Gajah is a small village in Larut, Matang and Selama District, Perak, Malaysia. This small village is located at Terong near Taiping. It has a mosque called Masjid Padang Gajah.

== Notable birthplace ==
- Yusof Ishak – Second Yang di-Pertuan Negara of Singapore (1959–1965) and the First President of the Republic of Singapore (1965–1970)
