= Yusof Ishak Secondary School =

Yusof Ishak Secondary School 尤索夫依萨中学 Sekolah Menengah Yusof Ishak யூசுப் இசாக் உயர்நிலைப்பள்ளி
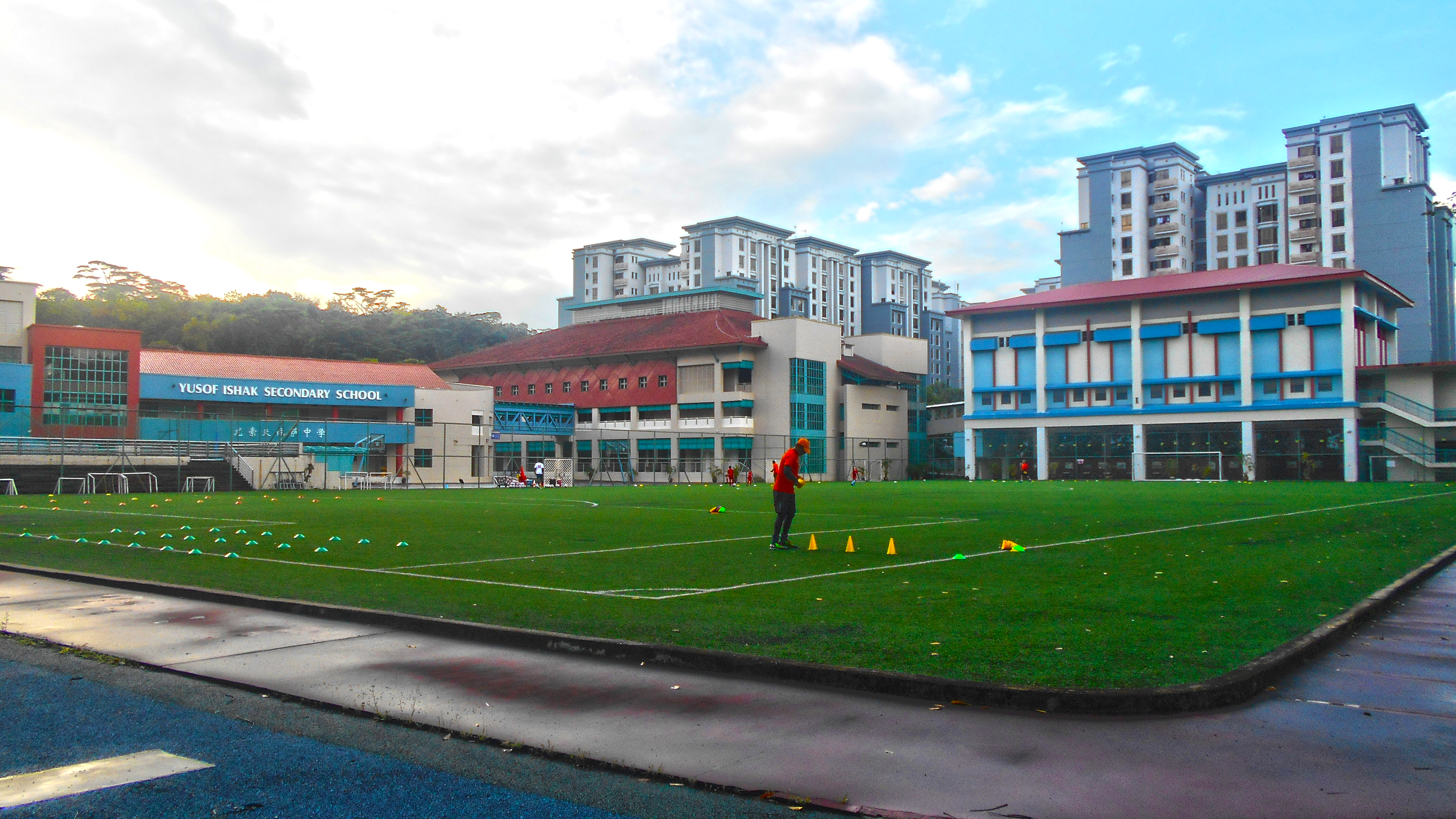
- Yusof Ishak Secondary School in 2017

Location
- 8 Sumang Walk, Singapore 828676; Singapore; 1.4071°N 103.8965°E

Information
- Type: Government
- Motto: "Ilmu Suluh Hidup" (Malay) "Knowledge is the Light of Life"
- Established: 1965; 61 years ago
- Session: Single session
- School code: 3307
- Principal: Mr Chen Ziyang
- Colour: Dark Blue White
- Website: https://yusofishaksec.moe.edu.sg/

Yusof Ishak Secondary School (YISS) is a co-educational government secondary school located in Punggol, Singapore. The school is named after Yusof Ishak, the first President of Singapore.

== History ==
The school was started under the name Jubilee Integrated Secondary School in 1965, with 984 pupils in two streams, English and Malay. It was officially opened as Yusof Ishak Secondary School at Jubilee Road on 29 July 1966, named after the first President of Singapore, Yusof Ishak. The school moved to Bukit Batok in December 1998 and inaugurated on 29 July 2000 by Ong Chit Chung, Member of Parliament for Bukit Timah GRC.

YISS was the first school to top the value-added ranking in both Express and Normal Streams. In 2010, it was evaluated as value-added, and its National Cadet Corps (Land) Girls unit received the Best Unit award.

In 2018, in response to declining student numbers at Bukit Batok and rising demand in Punggol, the school announced its relocation to Punggol. To minimize disruption to students, MOE stopped admitting new Secondary 1 cohorts to the current Bukit Batok campus in 2019 and 2020.

The school began receiving new students at its relocated Punggol campus from 2022.

== School identity and culture ==
=== Uniform ===
Students wear a white shirt with the school badge worn on the left collar, coupled with dark blue shorts (for male lower secondary students), pants (for male upper secondary students), or skorts (for females). The school tie is worn on formal school functions.

=== Core values ===
The six values of YISS are Integrity, Self Respect, Purpose, Inquisitiveness, Resilience and Empathy (InSPIRE).

The school motto is Ilmu Suluh Hidup, which means "knowledge is the light of life" in Malay.

== Co-curricular activities ==
As part of MOE's LEAPS2.0 program, students are required to take part in a co-curricular activity. The CCAs in Yusof Ishak Secondary School can be divided into categories:

1. Uniformed Groups
2. Visual and Performing Arts
3. Sports
4. Clubs & Societies.

Uniformed Groups

- NCC
- NPCC
- Boys Brigade
- Girls Brigade

Visual and Performing Arts

- Choir
- Concert Band
- Modern Dance
- Chinese Orchestra

Physical Sports

- Wushu
- Table Tennis
- Badminton
- Basketball (Boys)
- Fencing
- Softball (Girls)
Achievements (2000–2015)

School Awards:

- Academic (Value-added) (Normal) (Bronze) (2000, 2001, 2002, 2004, 2005, 2007, 2009)
- Character Development Award (2009–2013)
- National Education Development Award (2010–2012)
- Sustained Achievement Award for Uniform Group
- Sustained Achievement Award for Green Audit (Lotus) Award (2006–2009)
- Silver for 3Rs Award Competition (2007–2010)
- Cherish Award (Silver) 2010
- Innergy Award (Silver) 2009, (Bronze) 2010, Commendation (2010)
- Model Tuckshop Award (Gold) (2008–2010)
- TAF Award (Silver) 2008

CCA Achievements:

- Sports and Games
  - Nationals Inter School Sepak Takraw 2015 - Champions
  - West Zone Inter School Sepak Takraw 2010 – Runners-up
  - West Zone Inter School Sepak Takraw 2009 – 3rd placing
  - West Zone Inter School Sepak Takraw 2009 – 3rd placing
- Uniformed Groups
  - NCC Girls (Land) Best Unit Award (Awarded to the Best Girls Land Unit in Singapore)
  - National Cadet Corps (Boys Unit) – Gold, 2002–2006, 2008, 2009, 2010
  - National Cadet Corps (Girls Unit) – Silver 2006-2008, Gold 2009, 2010
  - National Police Cadet Corps – Silver 2005, 2009-2010 Gold 2006-2008
- Arts and Aesthetics
  - Art & Craft - 1 Silver 2010, 1 Gold 2008, 1 Bronze 2008
  - Choir - Silver 2009
  - SYF Display Band Competition – Bronze 2006, 2010 Silver in 2008
  - Indian Dance – Silver 2005, 2007, 2009
  - Malay Dance – Silver 2005, 2009 Gold 2007
  - Contemporary Dance – Bronze Award 2005, 2007, 2009
  - Singapore Arts and Craft Central Judging in 2008, 2009 (Level 1 Award: Gold)
  - Ngee Ann Poly Design and Build Competition 2007 (1st Runner Up)
- Other Awards (National Cognitive)
  - Biotech Fair Competition: Merit Award in 2006 and 3rd placing in 2007
  - Wonders of Science: 2nd placing (Team 1) and Merit Award (Team 2) in 2007
  - Singapore Mathematics Olympiad 2007 (1 Silver, 2 Bronze)
  - CL National Story Competition 2007 (1st Runner Up)
  - NUS Physics Competition for Sec School, 2009: 2nd
  - School Digital Media Awards: Silver Award in 2009

== School facilities ==
=== Canteen ===
The canteen currently consists of 6 open stalls with 3 being dedicated to SATS food. The other stalls consist of a drink and snacks store, Malay noodle stall and another snack stall in partnership with the Society for Physically Disabled (SPD).
