= Ishak bin Ahmad =

Malayan civil servant (1887–1969)

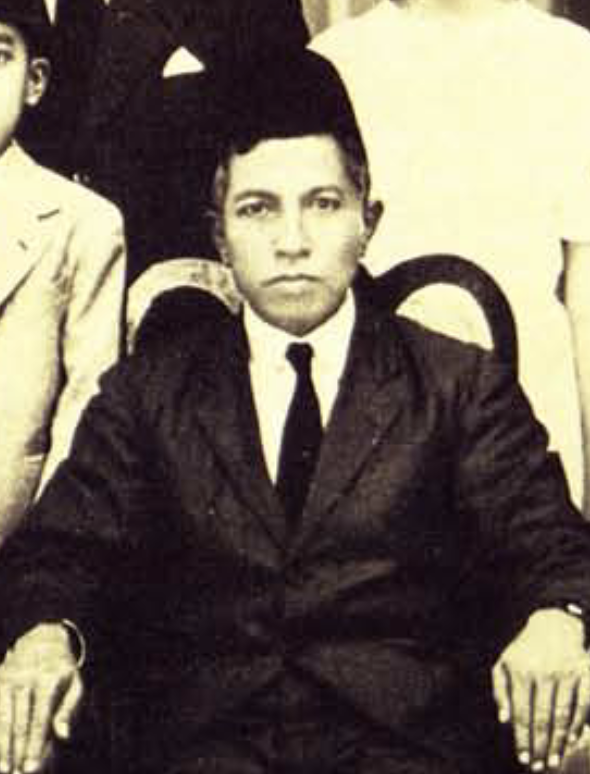
Ishak in 1933

Ishak bin Ahmad (1887 — 8 January 1969) was a prominent civil servant and the father of Yusof Ishak, the first president of Singapore.

== Career ==
In 1906, Ishak became a clerk at the Taiping District Office. In 1914, he joined the Fisheries Department as an assistant inspector.

In 1923, Ishak and his family moved to Singapore, and was made the Senior Fishery Officer at the Fisheries Department. Throughout the 1920s and the 1930s, he conducted biological surveys of Pulau Tioman, tuna experiments in Terengganu and inspections of Kelongs on Pulau Ketam. In 1926, he participated in the first survey expedition conducted by the Fisheries Department. He was the only Malay member of the expedition, and served as its official taxonomiser. During the expedition, he provided the Malay names of more than 75 species of fish. In the same year, he became a founding member of the Kesatuan Melayu Singapura, a political party in Singapore.

In 1933, he served as the acting Director of Fisheries while William Birtwistle was on leave. He again served as acting Director of Fisheries in 1937 while Birtwistle was on leave. In the same year, he was awarded the Malayan Coronation Medal. He was awarded the Medal of the Civil Division of the Most Excellent Order of the British Empire in 1939. In the same year, he established the first fisheries school in British Malaya in Tanah Merah, as well as a Malay school on Pulau Sudong. He retired from the Fisheries Department in 1941.

== Personal life and death ==
Ishak was born in 1887 in the village of Kuala Trong in Perak.

Ishak was the father of Yusof Ishak, the first president of Singapore, Aziz Ishak, the first Minister of Agriculture of the Federation of Malaya, Abdul Rahim Ishak, a prominent politician and journalist, and Ramli Ishak.

He died on 8 January 1969.
