= Early Founders Memorial Stone =

Memorial to the early founders of Singapore

Foundation Stone of the Monument of the Early Founders of Singapore
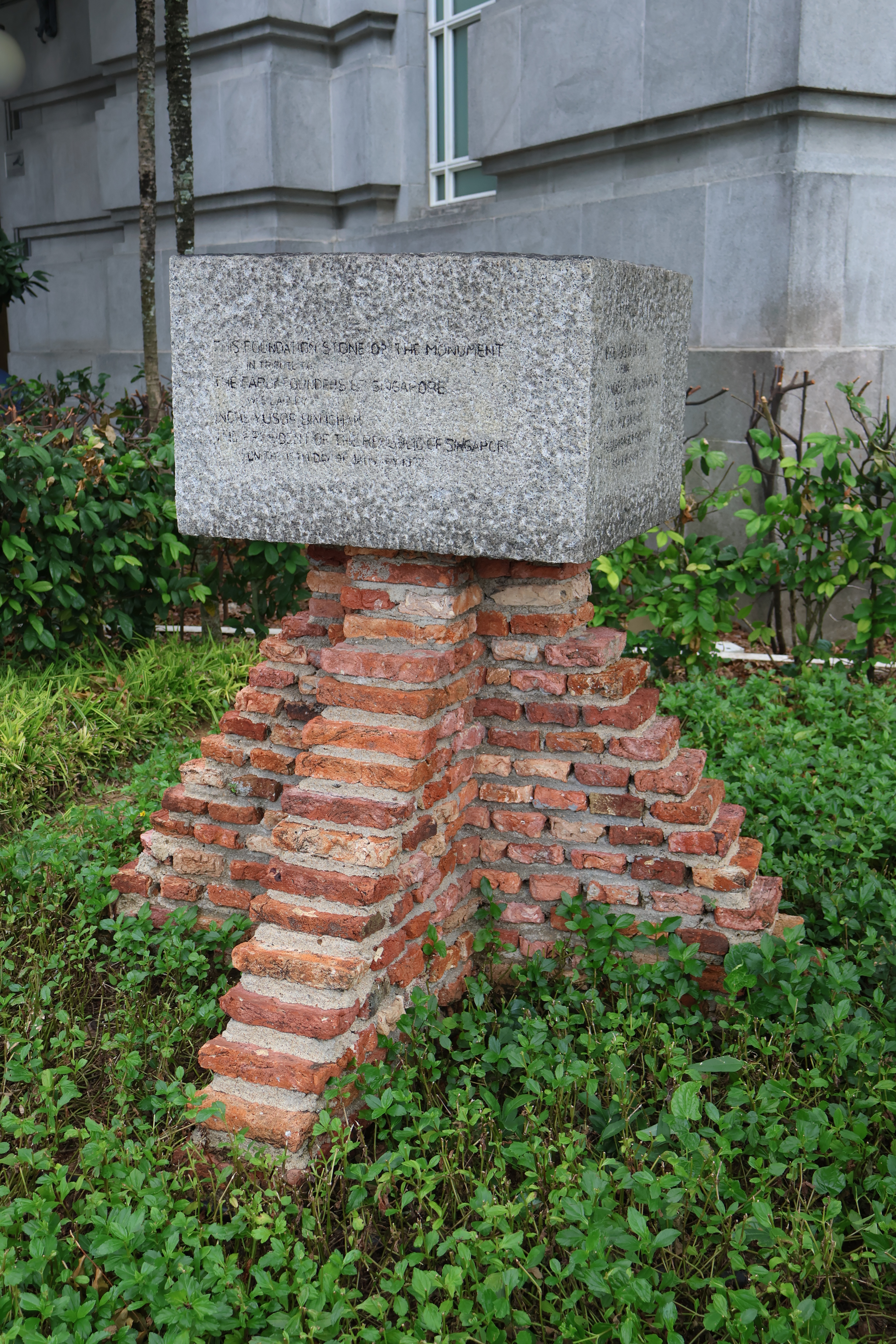
- The Early Founders Memorial Stone in 2026, in the grounds of The Fullerton Hotel Singapore.
- Interactive map of Foundation Stone of the Monument of the Early Founders of Singapore
- Location: Singapore
- Coordinates: 1°17′36.52″N 103°50′54.20″E
- Type: foundation stone
- Material: granite stone
- Beginning date: 18 January 1970
- Dedicated to: Early Founders of Singapore

The Foundation Stone of the Monument of the Early Founders of Singapore, usually called the Early Founders Memorial Stone, is a national memorial that is dedicated to the early founders ("Unknown Immigrants") of Singapore. The original idea was raised by a graduates' association, and an open design competition was held for the memorial project. The foundation stone was initially erected along Collyer Quay Street outside the Fullerton Hotel in 1970. After a series of setbacks and delays, the project was finally scrapped after no worthy design was accepted, which resulted in the foundation stone becoming the memorial afterwards. In 2000, the memorial was relocated to the National Archives of Singapore at Canning Rise before moving back to the grounds of The Fullerton Hotel in 2010.

== History ==
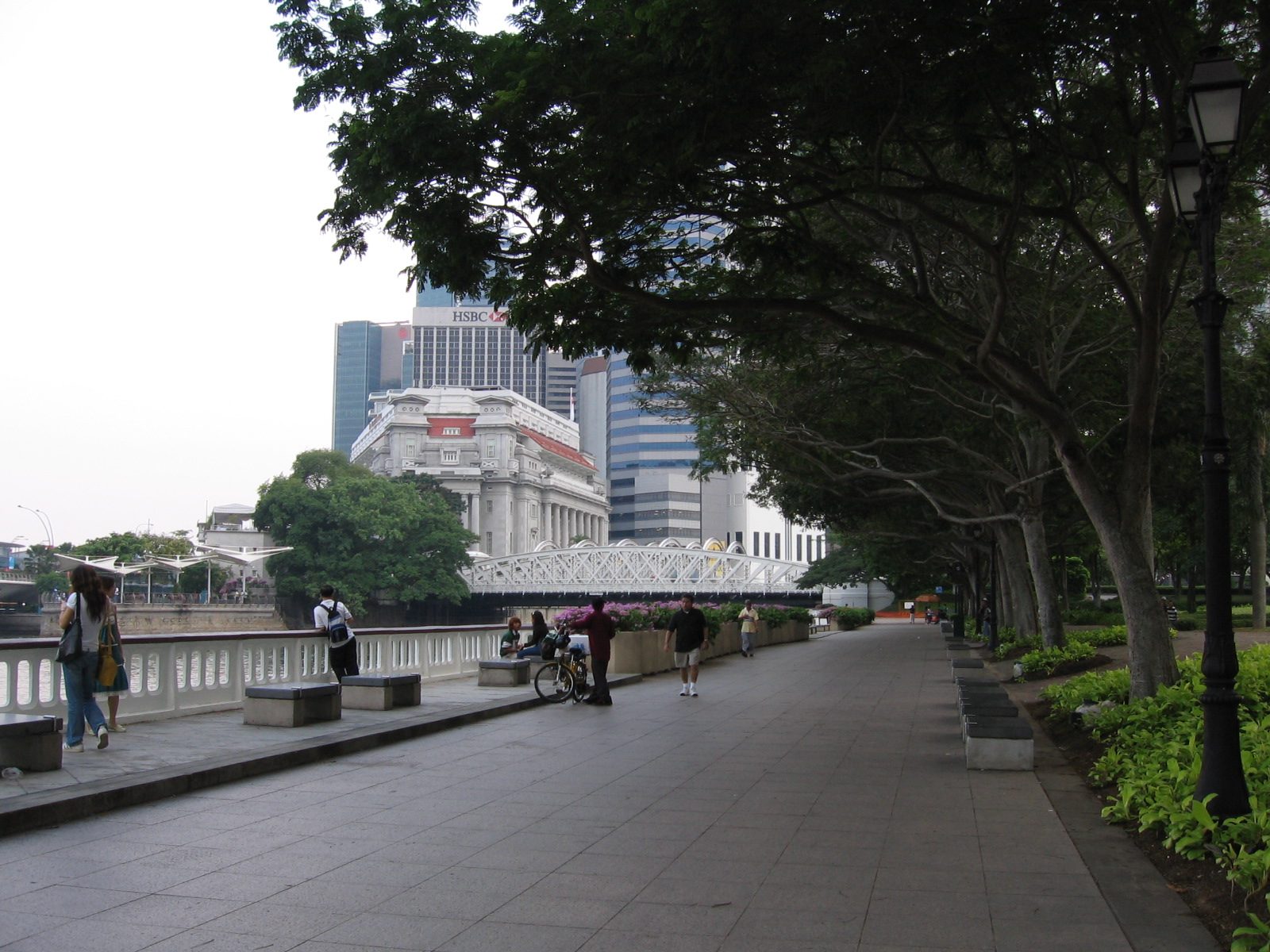
The Queen Elizabeth Walk was the proposed site for the national memorial. In the background is the Fullerton Hotel (building in white), where the memorial stone was initially erected in 1970.

The original idea of erecting a keynote memorial at the Singapore waterfront as a dedication to Singapore's early founders was mooted in 1969 by the Alumni International Singapore (AIS), a body set up to represent Singaporean graduates from 11 countries who had gathered locally for Singapore's 150th anniversary. AIS announced that a proposed memorial on Queen Elizabeth Walk by the Padang would require some S$250,000 (US$163,000) to be raised. An open design competition was held and sculptors were asked to come up with a design to celebrate the Singaporean for "his courage, his adventurous and enterprising spirit and his indomitable will, not only to survive but to make good."

=== Foundation stone ===
On 18 January 1970, President Yusof bin Ishak laid the memorial's foundation stone along Collyer Quay Street, on what was supposed to be a temporary site. Before an audience of some 500 people, including members of the diplomatic corps, President Yusof gave a speech:

It carries no great names. In fact it has no names at all. It is for all men. It is not for the Chinese, the Indian, the Eurasian or any other single race. It is for all who in one way or another helped to create a modern multiracial, multicultural and multilingual Singapore.

The foundation stone consists of a rectangular granite stone topping off a pyramid-shaped brick pedestal with inscriptions in the four official languages (English, Malay, Mandarin, and Tamil):

This foundation stone of the monument in tribute to the early founders of Singapore was laid by Inche Yusof Bin Ishak, the President of the Republic of Singapore on the 18th day of January 1970.

=== Competition ===
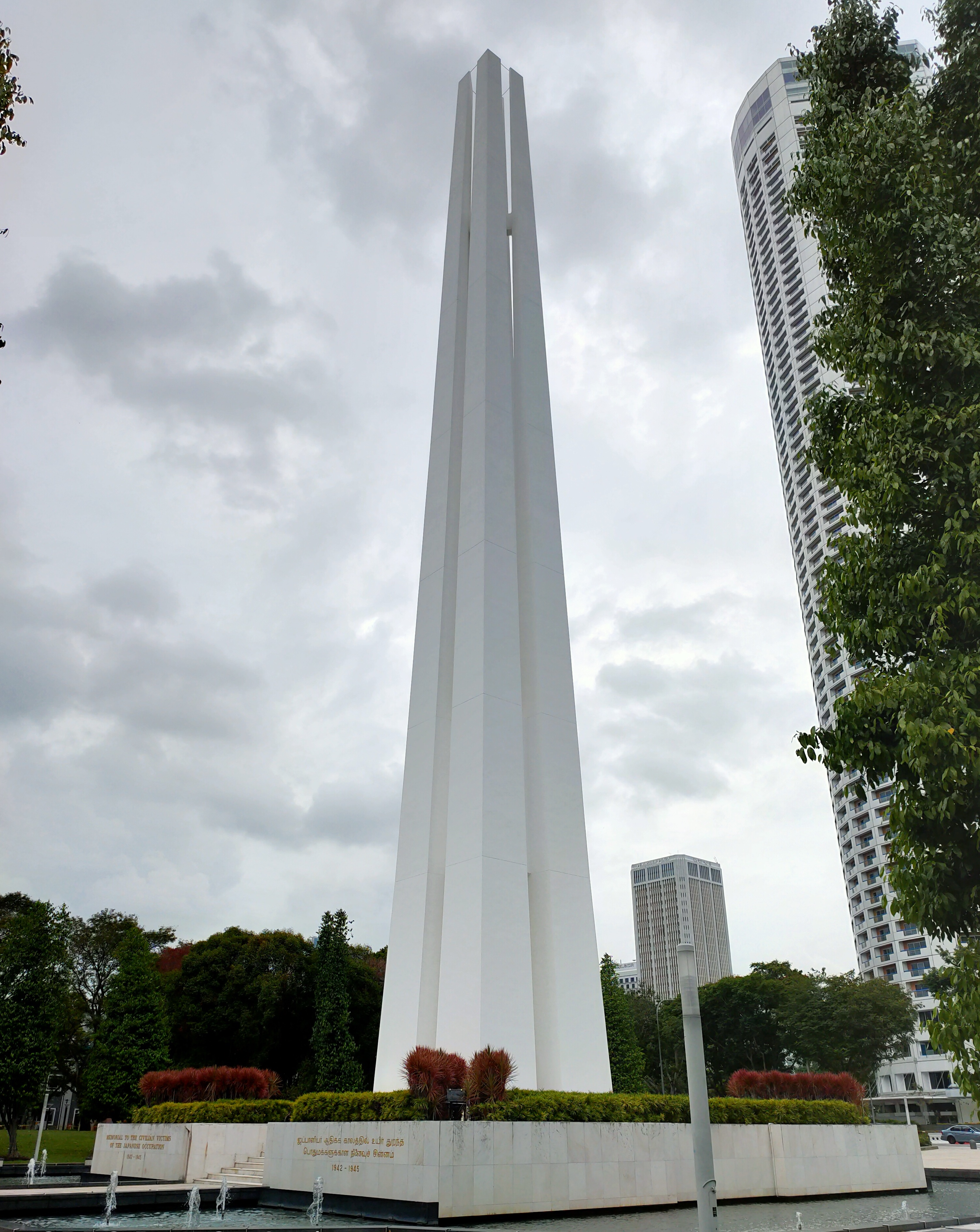
The Civilian War Memorial in the War Memorial Park at Beach Road was referred as resembling "four chopsticks".

In July 1973, designs for the memorial had been received from 38 sculptors but the top two prizes were not awarded; it was found that no entry was deemed worthy of the honour by the AIS panel of judges earlier. Instead, five sculptors received merit awards from AIS, together with a token S$250.

One of the merit awards recipients, Ng Eng Teng, who was to receive Singapore's Cultural Medallion in 1981 and who now has his critically acclaimed works all over Singapore, commented unhappily: "We have never been so embarrassed or insulted in all our professional lives. No professional artist of our standing would condescend to receive such an amount. We felt we had been taken for a ride."

In response, AIS expressed regret that the aggrieved sculptors had publicly stated their dissatisfaction. The alumni further rejected a complaint that the results were 10 months overdue, and repeated that no suitable entry had been received. Subsequently, three of the five sculptors banded together to produce a design they described as "four pieces of cuboid leaning towards each other and pivoted on four corners" which was referred by AIS as resembling "four chopsticks". Ironically, this was the nickname and roughly the design concept of the Civilian War Memorial, which was adopted in another separate open competition in 1966.

In September 1975, the alumni announced in public again that the Early Founders Project was at "a very advanced stage and will be launched as soon as Government approval has been obtained. The site of the monument has already been earmarked on the reclaimed land off the Esplanade."

Despite the announcement, the ambitious project became inactive and was finally scrapped after no worthy design was accepted and not nearly enough of the S$250,000 funds had been raised. In 1985, the alumni announced that the funds collected earlier would be rediverted to other projects, such as providing scholarships.

=== Roles switched ===
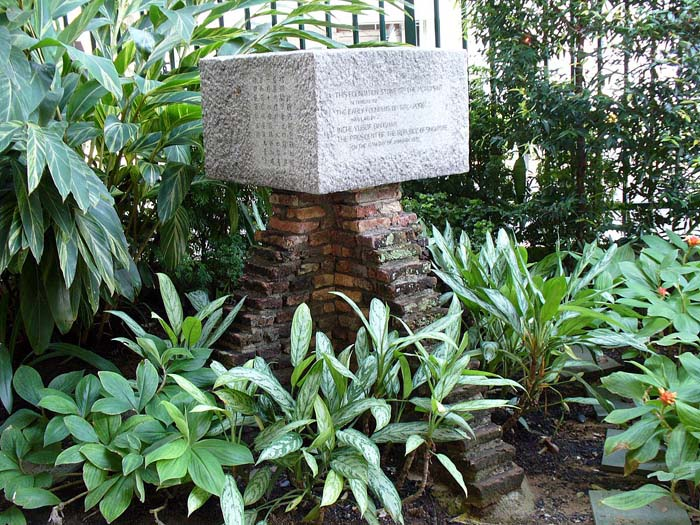
The Memorial Stone at the premises of the National Archives of Singapore at Canning Rise, Singapore

As a result, the memorial stone became the memorial itself. The monument was later moved by the authorities to make way for the gentrification of the Fullerton Building, and was relocated to the National Archives of Singapore, where it stands almost forgotten. The authorities hope that when Singapore's community of values had evolved to the point that a common language of art could be used to complete the task of building such a monument again.

On 9 July 2010, the foundation stone was moved back to the corner of Fullerton Building where it now sits overlooking the Singapore River following a ceremony and speech by The Minister for Information, Communication and the Arts.

== See also ==
- Fort Canning Lighthouse
- Long Ya Men
