= Richard Allmond Jeffrey Goode =

British colonial administrator (1873-1953)

Sir Richard Allmond Jeffrey Goode, CMG, CBE (30 April 1873 – 25 May 1953) was a Newfoundland-born British colonial administrator in Northern Rhodesia. He was twice acting Governor of Northern Rhodesia.

Goode was appointed a Companion of the Order of St Michael and St George (CMG) in the 1924 Birthday Honours, on the termination of the administrative functions of the British South Africa Company in Northern Rhodesia, when he was Chief Secretary to the Government and former Deputy Administrator and Secretary to the Administrationin Northern Rhodesia.

A son was the colonial administrator Sir William Goode.
