= Yusof Ishak =

President of Singapore from 1965 to 1970

His Excellency Yusof Ishak DUT DK SMN
- Yusof in 1960

1st President of Singapore
- In office 9 August 1965 – 23 November 1970
- Prime Minister: Lee Kuan Yew
- Preceded by: Office established
- Succeeded by: Yeoh Ghim Seng (acting); Benjamin Sheares

2nd Yang di-Pertuan Negara of Singapore
- In office 3 December 1959 – 9 August 1965
- Monarchs: Elizabeth II; Putra of Perlis
- Prime Minister: Lee Kuan Yew
- Preceded by: Sir William Goode
- Succeeded by: Position abolished

Personal details
- Born: Yusof bin Ishak Al-Haj (Note: Al-Haj is an honorific title given to people who complete the pilgrimage to Mecca, which Yusof did in 1963.); 12 August 1910 Padang Gajah, Perak, Federated Malay States (present-day Perak, Malaysia)
- Died: 23 November 1970 (aged 60) Singapore General Hospital, Singapore
- Cause of death: Heart failure
- Resting place: Kranji State Cemetery
- Party: Independent
- Spouse: Noor Aishah Mohammad Salim (m. 1949)
- Relations: Aziz Ishak (younger brother); Abdul Rahim Ishak (younger brother)
- Children: 3
- Parent: Ishak bin Ahmad (father)
- Education: Victoria Bridge School; Raffles Institution
- Occupation: Journalist; civil servant
- Yusof Ishak's voice Yusof speaking at the 1962 Cultural Festival

Yusof bin Ishak Al-Haj (/ˈjʊsɒf bɪn ˈɪshɑːk/ YUUSS-off bin ISS-hahk; 12 August 1910 – 23 November 1970) was a Singaporean journalist and civil servant who served as the head of state of Singapore from 1959 to 1970: as the second Yang di-Pertuan Negara of Singapore between 1959 and 1965 and the first president of Singapore between 1965 and 1970.

Born in the Federated Malay States, Yusof received his education in Malaysia and Singapore, graduating from Raffles Institution in 1929. He worked in journalism, creating a sports magazine with friends before joining Warta Malaya, a Malay-language daily newspaper. Leaving Warta in 1938, Yusof co-founded Utusan Melayu, a newspaper more centred on Malay issues, in 1939 with other Malay figures in Singapore.

He was a central figure in Utusan's success, staying with the newspaper for two decades. However, he left in 1959 following conflicts between Utusan and the UMNO, which culminated in the UMNO buying all of their shares in order to better control the newspaper's political viewpoints. Returning to Singapore from Kuala Lumpur, Yusof was invited to serve as chairman of the Public Service Commission by prime minister Lee Kuan Yew, who had been appointed following the People's Action Party's success at the 1959 general election. On 3 December 1959, he succeeded Sir William Goode as Yang di-Pertuan Negara. He would serve in this role until 1965, when Singapore gained independence from Malaysia and the post of Yang di-Pertuan Negara was replaced by the president of Singapore.

Yusof served three terms as head of state before his death in office on 23 November 1970 due to heart failure. During his presidency, he was known for his multi-racial beliefs, especially in the 1960s, when he was a strong supporter of Singapore's merger with Malaya. Even after Singapore's split, he continued to spread the idea of a multi-racial society. Yusof also believed in education and supported talks on religion. Following his death, he was succeeded by Benjamin Sheares on 2 January 1971. Several places in Singapore bear his name, and his portrait appears on the current Singapore Portrait Series currency notes introduced in 1999.

== Early life ==
=== Birth and ancestry ===
Yusof was born on 12 August 1910 in Padang Gajah, Terong, Perak, which was then a part of the Federated Malay States (present-day West Malaysia), to Ishak bin Ahmad and Eishah Tun Haji Aminuddin. The eldest son of nine siblings, Yusof was of Malay and Sumatran descent. His father was of Minangkabau descent and lived in Penang before moving to Perak, whilst his mother was of Malay descent and came from Langkat, North Sumatra. Yusof and his family lived in government housing at McNair Road.

Yusof's family historically originated from Sumatra. His father Ishak was raised on reformist beliefs and, according to Yusof's brother Abdul Rahim Ishak, taught the Quran to his children with a more modern view. Ishak also attended English-language education, which was considered unconventional at the time, and later sent his children to English schools as well. Ishak worked as a civil servant who once held the post of acting director of fisheries. Two of Yusof's younger brothers, Aziz and Abdul Rahim, grew up to be active in politics in Malaysia and Singapore, respectively.

=== Education ===
Yusof received his primary education at Kuala Kurau School and a Malay school, (Note: The name of this school is unknown.) before attending the King Edward VII School, all located in Taiping, Perak; his father tend to relocate between Perak and Singapore, as he believed that the Japanese would attack from the south. In 1923, when Ishak was posted to Singapore as acting director of the fisheries department, the family relocated there and Yusof continued his education at Victoria Bridge School. In 1924, he was enrolled in Raffles Institution (RI) for his secondary education. RI was considered a prestigious school, and he was part of a few Malays that attended RI.

During his time in RI, he played various sports such as swimming, weight lifting, water-polo, boxing, hockey, basketball, and cricket. A member of the National Cadet Corps, Yusof was the first student to be appointed as an officer, holding the rank of second lieutenant. He was also a co-editor of school newspaper The Rafflesian and a prefect. In sports, he won the Aw Boon Par Cup in boxing and was the national weightlifting champion in 1932 and 1933, respectively. In 1927, Yusof passed his Cambridge School Certificate examination with distinctions and entered the Queen's Scholarship Class in RI. He was one of 13 students in the Queen's Scholarship Class, along with being the only Malay student. He studied at RI for two more years, graduating in 1929 when he was unable to get the scholarship.

Yusof initially intended to pursue law, but his study application in London was rejected and his father could not afford to send him overseas. Instead, he began working at the Federated Malay States Police Academy in Kuala Lumpur as a trainee cadet. Yusof was promised a promotion to officer by the police commissioner, but it was later withdrawn after he stood up to a Malaysian royal family member who had mistreated his juniors. He left the police force soon after and returned to Singapore. Additionally, while in secondary school, Yusof joined the youth wing of the Singapore Malay Union (KMS) and, by 1938, became its secretary-general.

== Journalism career ==
In Singapore, he began his journalism career by co-founding the fortnightly sports magazine Sportsman with two Chinese friends – Ong Chin Beng and Soh Swee Tuck; Yusof's mother gave him S$6,000 to start the magazine. In 1932, Yusof joined Warta Malaya, a Malay newspaper with the highest circulation at that time, as a clerk at the invitation of his friend Syed Hussein bin Ali Alsagoff. He worked at Warta for a few years, becoming a manager and acting director. During his time there, Warta was heavily influenced by developments in the Middle East and Yusof wanted a newspaper more dedicated to Malay issues; the other largest Malay newspaper at the time was Jawi Peranakan, which was run by Muslims of Indian descent.

=== Founding and management of Utusan Melayu ===
In January 1938, Yusof and twenty other Malays met with KMS president Inche Daud bin Mohd to discuss establishing a Malay-owned newspaper to better represent their views. (Note: Warta Malaya was owned by the Arab Singaporean Alsagoff family, from 1930 to 1941.) The discussion focused on the creation and management of such a project, as a similar attempt in 1937 had failed due to a lack of support. A consensus was reached to launch a newspaper, and Yusof was assigned to investigate the feasibility and gather funds for the project; he was also chosen due to his previous experience with Warta. They registered the Utusan Melayu Press Ltd. on 18 June 1932, and to raise funds for the newspaper, Yusof and other members travelled around Singapore, Johor, and Kuala Lumpur to sell shares. However, they were only able to sell a few. They also visited mosques weekly and held talks to the congregation about their newspaper, usually receiving a lukewarm reception. Furthermore, Yusof contacted experienced journalist Abdul Rahim Kajai of Warta Malaya to secure his support and got him to join the newspaper; Yusof subsequently nominated himself for the role of the newspaper's manager. As the deadline approached, members Ambo Sooloh and Daud J. P. contributed $8,500 between themselves to cover the shortfall and save the project. A total of $18,000 was raised.

On 29 May 1939, Yusof and other Malay figures, including Sooloh and Daud, founded Utusan Melayu, with Yusof serving as its first managing director for the next two decades. He rented out a cheap office in Queen Street and a moveable jawi flatbed press from Hong Kong. Initial sales were low, but Yusof and the other members continued to work twelve hour workdays weekly. Early challenges faced by Utusan included low readership; in the first few months, they published 1,000 copies per issue, but sales were lower than Yusof expected and copies were eventually reduced to 600. Utusan also faced financial issues, and Yusof often loaned money from Daud in order to pay his employees. He also converted a space on the first floor into a living area for himself. Utusan reporter Ali Salim stated that "it took quite some time before we managed to have about four decent tables with drawers" for their office, and that sometimes "the editorial staff worked till late at night and slept in the office". Due to Utusan's poor performance, many doubted that it would survive for long; Warta published headlines that insulted their competitor. Abdul Rahim, whom Yusof previously secured the support of, delayed his transfer from Warta over to Utusan for a few months. Eventually, once Abdul Rahim joined in August 1939, Utusan would perform better. In November 1939, they would launch two new weekly papers, Utusan Zaman and Mastika.

Under Yusof's management, he was described as "the driving force of Utusan Melayu". Writers were punished for writing or grammar mistakes and corrected while inactive reporters were fired immediately, but received a month's pay. During the Pacific War, despite suffering a decrease in staff and frequent bombing from the Japanese, Yusof and other staff continued to publish Utusan Melayu. According to one account, during the bombings of 1941, Yusof ignored the air-raid sirens and made the staff continue working on Utusan. A lookout was stationed on the roof and Yusof only permitted staff to head to the bomb shelters when Japanese planes were directly overhead; this allowed Utusan to remain on schedule during the war. His editorial policy at Utusan was Malay-Muslim centred, multi-racial, and progressive, and he supported education in the Malay community. Due to his beliefs of multi-racialism and racial equality, he was a controversial figure in the Malay community as he did not attribute challenges faced by the Malay community to other groups, nor did he defend the Malay royal families. By 1958, Utusan's daily circulation would reach around 30,000, the largest amount ever achieved by any Malay newspaper at that time.

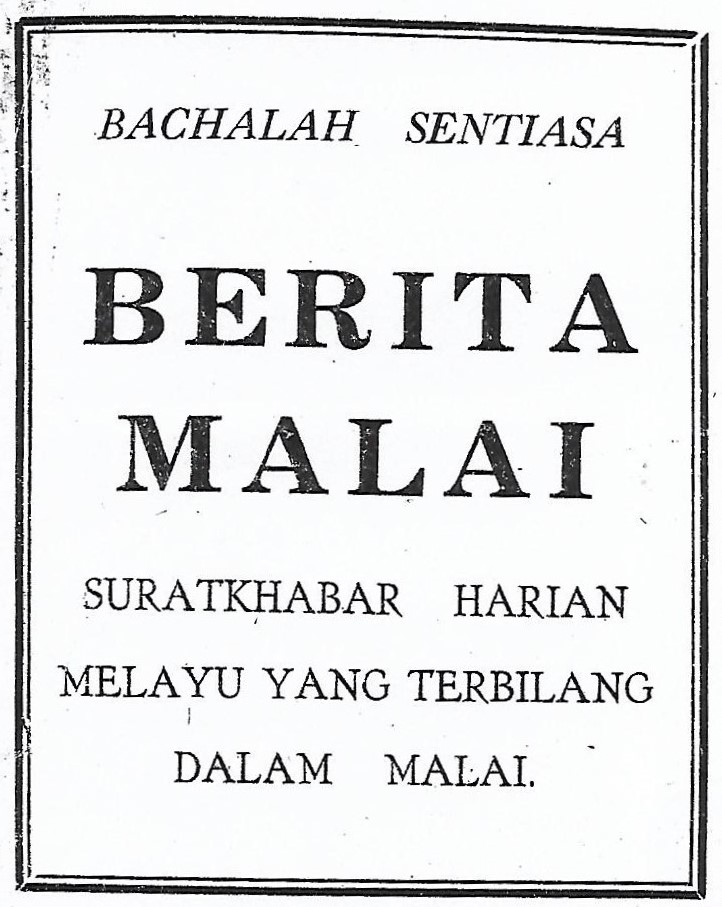
Logo of Berita Malai

Two days before the fall of Singapore, Utusan had only printed about fifty copies. Despite that, Yusof went around with three other staff members to distribute the newspaper themselves. At the start of the Japanese occupation, they stopped circulation as machinery used to print the paper was requisitioned by the Japanese military to publish a Japanese newspaper instead. Yusof was detained by the Japanese for two weeks before being released and ordered to work as an editor at Berita Malai – a Malay newspaper that was run by the Japanese. Yusof only worked there for a year, when he resigned following disagreements with editor Ibrahim Ya'cob. He then returned to Taiping; he told his boss that he was unwell and resting. While there, he ran a provisions shop and returned to Singapore after the Japanese surrendered.

After the war ended, Yusof helped to reestablish Utusan alongside some other members such as Ramli Haji Tahir. Despite losing their printing machines, they managed to republish the paper by 10 September – five days after British forces returned to Singapore – by printing at the Straits Times Printing Press. Yusof returned to Singapore on 17 September to take over management and editing of Utusan from Ramli. During this time, they moved their headquarters to Cecil Street and recovered two of their old machines. They had also received S$3,000 in donations to set Utusan up again. Utusan also occasionally borrowed vans from The Straits Times, with Straits Times assisting them further by sending their engineers over when Utusan's machinery failed. In the late 1940s, Yusof went on a trip to Europe to learn from the newspaper industry in an attempt to improve Utusan. He was impressed by British newspaper companies' printing machinery and learnt about article writing. After returning from Europe, he recruited cartoonist Salihuddin as he wanted to include visuals with Utusan's articles. He also wanted to expand on literary writing in the newspaper and gave the duty to writer Keris Mas, who had worked on Utusan's Mastika.

In 1948, Yusof criticised the Dutch's ban on Utusan Zaman in Indonesia, but did not appeal for it to be lifted. Following talks with Dutch officials, Yusof stated that they were attempting to be "friendly" with the Utusan-type newspapers. That same year, he was also a member of the first Malayan press delegation to London. In 1949, Utusan celebrated its tenth anniversary and Yusof gave a speech where he stated that "[Utusan's] 130 employees owned more than 25 per cent of the firm's total capital", further stating that it "was perhaps the only newspaper in the world in which 95 per cent of the employees were shareholders". In 1950, Yusof and the Utusan Melayu Press Ltd. appeared before the Supreme Court to show cause for contempt of court, following a publication of a newspaper featuring Michael Joseph Nonis on the front cover. Crown Council A. V. Winslow stated that the picture of Nonis under police escort was a contempt of court, as it showed his identity. Yusof explained that he was involved with the addition of a new printing machine and gave the supervision of Utusan to the sub-editor, leaving him unavailable to decide the picture's use that day. Yusof apologised for its use, which was accepted by Chief Justice Charles Murray-Aynsley, but they had to pay the costs of the case.

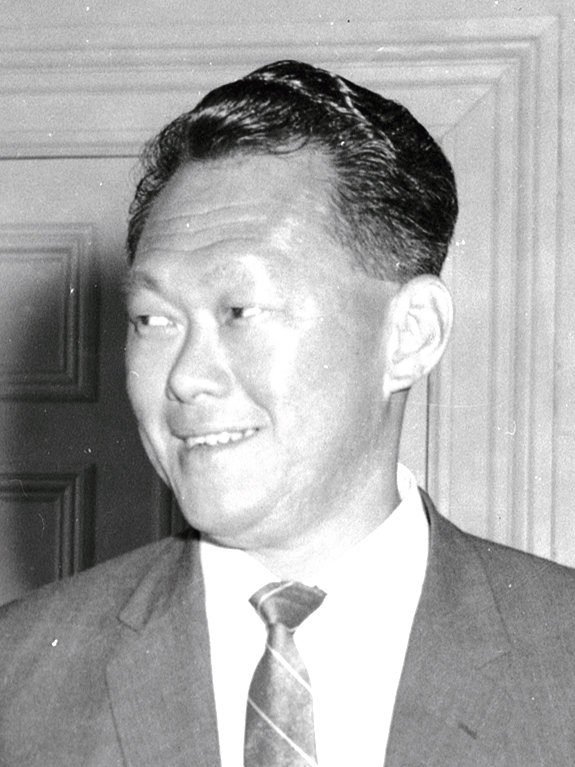
Yusof first met Lee Kuan Yew (pictured) when he worked at Laycock & Ong.

Following the end of World War II, Yusof's views were more anti-colonial and pro-independence, mainly following the British's performance during the war. This was seen in Utusan's publications as its tone became more progressive and political. Sometime after the war, Yusof wanted to replace Utusan's legal advisor – Progressive Party founder C. C. Tan – with someone with a more "radical, nationalist outlook". After consulting with lawyer John Laycock, Yusof was informed that a young lawyer, Lee Kuan Yew, was soon to return from England to work at his firm Laycock & Ong. Yusof then met with Lee at the Laycock & Ong office and they became good friends and fellow nationalists. In 1951, Yusof got help from Lee to represent his friend Abdul Samad Ismail after he was detained by the British; Abdul would later be a founding member of the People's Action Party with Lee. In his memoirs, Lee described Yusof in their meeting as a "tall, Indian-looking Malay in his late 40s, with a long, thin, un-Malay nose" and that he "[spoke] English well but in a hesitant manner and with a slight stammer". That same year, Yusof was invited by the United States to represent Malaya as a journalist and was also recommended for appointment as a nominated member of the Legislative Council.

In 1952, he commented on the Malayan Chinese Association's donation of S$500,000 to the Malay community, stating that the "gift should only be accepted if there are no strings attached" as it was ahead of the upcoming election. In 1954, Murray-Aynsley fined Yusof, as Utusan's managing director, S$150.00 for the newspaper's involvement in posting an editorial relating to the 1954 National Service riots. In 1955, he was appointed into the government Malayanisation Committee, which looked into the "malayanisation" efforts that the government could implement. He was the only Malay invited to the committee.

=== Departure from Utusan ===
In 1957, Yusof moved to Kuala Lumpur and, in February 1958, the headquarters of Utusan Melayu were also relocated to the city. With only a branch office left in Singapore, the move positioned the newspaper as more Malaya-based. Even though Utusan was an independent newspaper, it became a supporter of the United Malay Nationalist Organisation (UMNO) and the Alliance Party, especially after the war. Yusof, as Utusan's managing director, stated of the UMNO and the Alliance Party:

The Utusan Melayu has been a strong supporter of the UMNO and lately of the [Alliance Party], particularly during the first federal election of 1955, because the Utusan was launched with the expressed object of raising the status of our people, country and religion, and such an object could not be achieved if colonialism were to exist. The [Alliance Party], as everybody knows, was the only political party which articulately strove for independence and freedom. This explains the reason why Utusan Melayu has always been pro-UMNO and the [Alliance Party].

However, as Utusan adopted a more socialist slant in the 1950s, it soon came into conflict with UMNO's beliefs. While the newspaper continued supporting the Malays, Utusan published some articles which were considered critical of UMNO and Utusan's deputy editor referred to the Sultans as "feudal elements". UMNO then began buying shares from Utusan in 1955 in an attempt to control the newspaper. Yusof initially resisted the UMNO's attempts but finally left in 1959 after he sold all his shares.

== Yang di-Pertuan Negara (1959–1965) ==
After his resignation from Utusan Melayu, Yusof returned to Singapore. The People's Action Party (PAP) had just won the 1959 general elections and set up their own government. In July 1959, he was invited by new prime minister Lee to serve as chairman of the Public Service Commission, to which he accepted and was subsequently appointed to by Sir William Goode, the Yang di-Pertuan Negara. Since Singapore gained full internal self-governance from the British following the 1959 general elections, there were talks to replace Goode as Yang di-Pertuan Negara. In December 1959, the government announced that Yusof would succeed Goode on 3 December, marking the end of 140 years of colonial rule as Singapore became a fully self-governing nation. Yusof had held a few minor roles in the government before his appointment, such as on the Film Appeal Committee from 1948 to 1950 and as a member of the Nature Reserves Committee for a year. While his role was largely ceremonial, he could assent laws and give discretion to the appointment of the prime minister or dissolution of the Legislative Assembly.

There were initial concerns from the British of Yusof's citizenship, with the Secretary of State for the Colonies asking Goode about clarification on whether Yusof was a Singaporean or Malayan citizen. The British felt that if Yusof took up Singaporean citizenship, it would be seen as embarrassing to the British government and the Malayan prime minister Tunku Abdul Rahman. Conversely, if Yusof remained a Malayan citizen, they would have to seek the approval of the Tunku for Yusof's appointment. It was later found that Yusof was a Malayan citizen, but the Tunku stated he would leave the choice of appointment to the British and Singaporean governments. Some groups however, such as the Singapore Pan-Malay Islamic Party, stated that Malaya's Yang di-Pertuan Agong should have a say in the appointment and sent a petition letter to Queen Elizabeth II; the Tunku advised the British government to ignore their request.

According to culture minister Othman Wok, Yusof was chosen as he was Malay, a nationalist, and had a background at Utusan Melayu. Lee stated that a Malay Yang di-Pertuan Negara was needed to show the multi-racialism of Singapore and to remove its "Third China" image. According to his brothers Aziz and Abdul Rahim, Yusof was chosen for his pro-Singapore stance and previous reputation from Utusan Melayu. There were rumours that another possible candidate for Yang di-Pertuan Negara had been Tengku Ya'acob, the brother of the Tunku. In his memoirs The Singapore Story, Lee stated that "we chose [Yusof] [...] to be [Goode's] successor, our first native Yang di-Pertuan Negara. We wanted a distinguished Malay in order to show the Federation that Singaporeans were willing to accept Malays as their leaders, and I knew him as a good man of simple habits who carried himself with dignity."

=== First term (1959–1964) ===
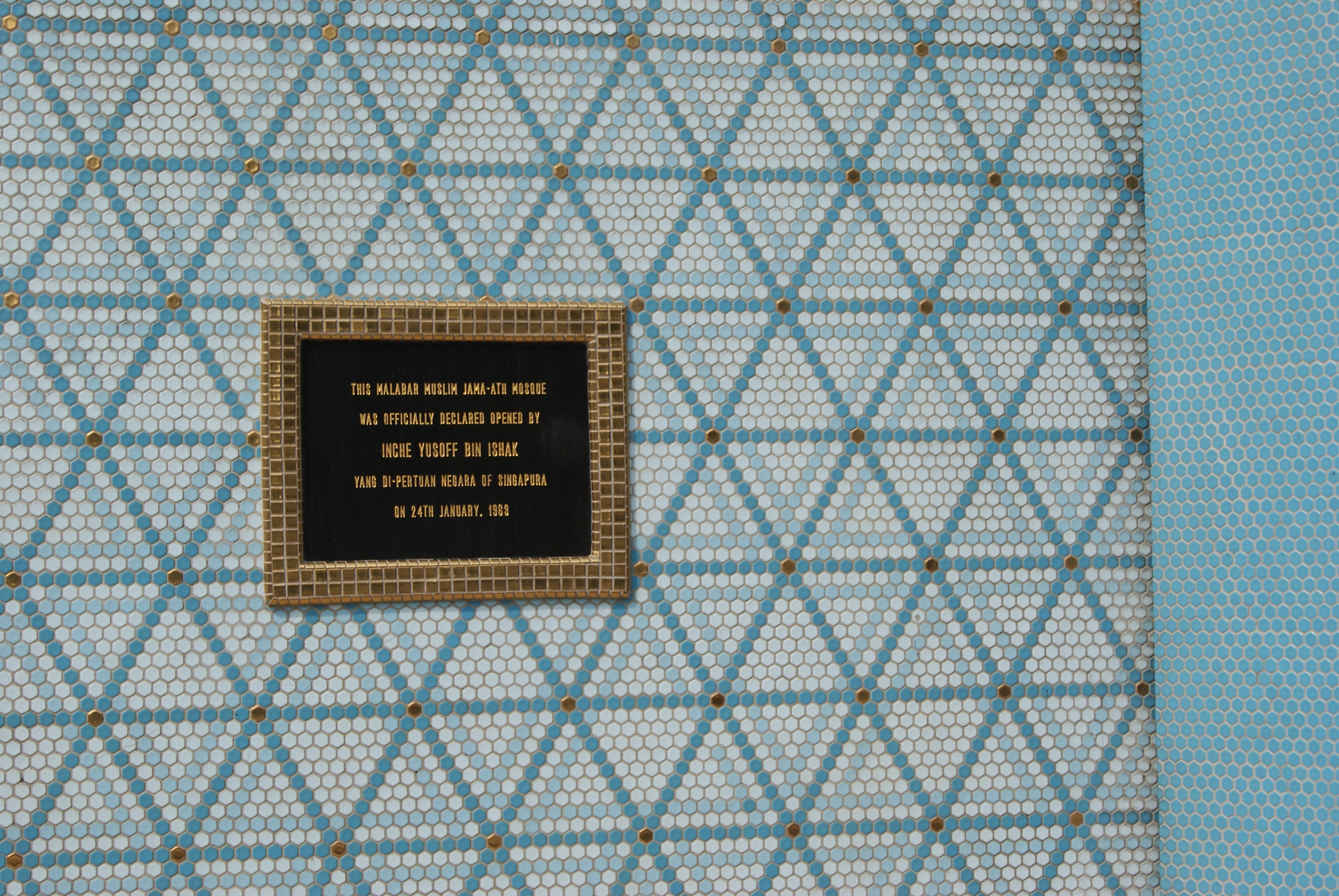
A plaque at Masjid Malabar commemorating its opening by Yusof during his time as Yang di-Pertuan Negara.

On 2 December, Yusof and his family moved into the Istana, the residence for the head of state. He was taken to City Hall the following day, where he was officially sworn in on 3 December 1959 as the Yang di-Pertuan Negara. Aziz stated that Yusof had accepted the role as he wanted to show the Malay community that the PAP were not anti-Malay and that they believed in multi-racialism. This was especially important at the time as the PAP sought Singapore's merger with Malaya and wanted the support of the Malays. On the Istana's grounds, Yusof moved into the secretary's bungalow with his family instead of living in the Istana itself. He wanted to show himself as a humble person instead of living in the prestigious Istana building. His wife, Noor Aishah, stated herself that "[the Istana] was too big. We preferred to stay at the smaller house."

From January to February 1960, Yusof visited the constituency of Southern Islands, where he planted a coconut tree and announced that during the Muslim's month of fasting, rice, sugar, and dates would be provided to them. He stated that the gesture was to show the government's support to the multi-religious people of Singapore. Yusof also marked the site of a new mosque that was to be built at the cost of S$3,000. In January 1961, he went on an unofficial visit to Malaya, where he witnessed the installation of the Yang di-Pertuan Agong in Kuala Lumpur and met with Penang's governor Raja Uda.

In April 1961, he went to Bras Basah, where he talked with constituents and was accompanied by its Member of Parliament (MP) Hoe Puay Choo. He visited Bukit Panjang in May 1961, touring its villages and the Bukit Panjang English School. That same month, he visited Bukit Timah and its community centres. During that visit, he also gave a speech about the importance of multi-racialism and asked for tolerance between the various races, cultures, and religions. After the 1961 Bukit Ho Swee fire in May, Yusof and Lee met with the homeless victims; he later toured the new housing blocks in Queenstown, Bukit Ho Swee, MacPherson, and Jalan Eunos for those affected by the fire in 1962.

On 11 June, he went on a five-hour tour of Changi with MP Teo Hock Guan, where he watched cultural concerts and spoke with organisation leaders from the area. Near the end of his Changi visit, he went to Pulau Ubin and met with its residents. On 26 June, he visited the Chua Chu Kang constituency and was accompanied by its MP Ong Chang Sam. In August, Yusof toured Bukit Merah. In April 1963, Yusof and his wife performed the pilgrimage to Mecca. They then went to Cambodia for four days at the invitation of Cambodian prime minister Norodom Sihanouk, being accompanied by education minister Yong Nyuk Lin. While returning to Singapore, Yusof and his wife decided to visit Ceylon (present-day Sri Lanka) for four days. They returned on 18 May.

==== Merger with Malaysia ====
In May 1961, Malaysian prime minister Tunku announced a proposal to merge Singapore, Malaya, Borneo, Brunei, and Sarawak. Both Lee and Yusof strongly supported the proposal, with Yusof stating that "Whatever our political differences, those of us who love this country and wish to spare it the tragedy of racial conflict must join forces to present a solid, anti-communal front." In November 1961, Yusof delivered a speech at the opening of the third Legislative Assembly, where he reiterated his support of the merger. In a 1962 New Year's Day message, he spoke on the progress that would be made throughout the year in forming Malaysia.

Following the 1962 integration referendum, Singapore declared independence on 31 August 1963 to merge with Malaya to form Malaysia, but Malaya delayed the merger to 16 September. During this period, Yusof, as Yang di-Pertuan Negara, held the powers of defense and external affairs of the state. However, this was disputed by the Malayan and British governments. Singapore would officially merge to form Malaysia on 16 September 1963. In Malaysia, Yusof's status was similar to the governors, and he occasionally attended meetings with the other rulers of the Malay states.

=== Second term (1964–1965) ===
External image
- Yusof taking the oath of office upon his reappointment as Yang di-Pertuan Negara as Chief Justice Wee Chong Jin watches. via National Archives of Singapore

Yusof was sworn in for a second term as Yang di-Pertuan Negara on 8 January 1964. His new term began under the state's revised constitution, following the conclusion of his previous term on 3 December 1963. His oath of office was administered by Chief Justice Wee Chong Jin. On 21 July, Yusof led a procession of 25,000 Muslims at the Padang to celebrate the prophet Mohammed's birthday. In a speech before the procession, he stated that the Muslims had to be "patient, forbearing and industrious" when it came to adjusting to the merger. Yusof further said that "Our unity must be a lasting one. We must be united not only when Malaysia faces threats from outside but also during other times." He later led the procession but left early once they reached Beach Road. This procession would lead to the 1964 race riots.

In April 1965, Yusof opened the National Language Month at the Victoria Theatre. In his opening speech, he emphasised his support for the initiative as it would help to develop a "deep sense of communication with one another", especially with Singapore being a part of Malaysia. A second National Language Month was held in November, which at its opening Yusof repeated the importance of adopting Malay as the common language of Singapore.

== Presidency (1965–1970) ==
=== Continued term (1965–1967) ===
External image
- Yusof's official presidential portrait, 1965 via National Archives of Singapore

On 9 August 1965, following conflicts between Malaysia and Singapore such as the 1964 race riots, Singapore was expelled from Malaysia and became an independent nation. Yusof officially started his presidency on 9 August 1965, but was known as the Yang di-Pertuan Negara until December 1965, when the Constitution (Amended) Bill was passed in parliament, which "[allowed] the present Yang di-Pertuan Negara, [Yusof], to become the first president, as if he had been duly elected." (Note: The Constitution (Amendment) Bill allowed for a transition from his role as Yang di-Pertuan Negara to president of Singapore. It considered his presidential term to have begun on 4 December 1963.) His role as president was similar during his time as Yang di-Pertuan Negara, but he held the authority to appoint cabinet ministers on the advice of the prime minister. After the split from Malaysia, Yusof continued to express his belief of a multi-racial society, commonly referencing it in his speeches. In 1966, he gave a New Year's speech addressing the separation:

Separation cannot deny us the right or deprive us [of] the power to demonstrate the correctness of our ideas within Singapore. I believe that we have a special responsibility to demonstrate the essential validity of our ideas because these ideas are relevant to the problems of not just Singapore but those of all multi-racial societies which want to give a better life to its people.

In July 1965, he was appointed for a five-year term as chancellor of the National University of Singapore, succeeding Lee Kong Chian. Yusof's first public appearance as chancellor was at the university's medical faculty that the following month, where he praised the development of medicine in Singapore. He delivered a speech at the opening of the first Parliament of Singapore in December, which the Barisan Sosialis had boycotted. In April 1966, he gave out the first President's Scholarships after Singapore's independence, being previously known as the Yang di-Pertuan Negara Scholarships. During a 1966 Telok Blangah visit, he acknowledged the multi-racial harmony of the constituency between the Malays and other races. In his tour to Punggol that same year, he stated that he was "deeply impressed by the spirit of goodwill, harmony, and tolerance amongst all our people." He also watched a dragon dance and met with Arabic musicians.

As chief patron of the Singapore Arts Society, he was gifted a bust by its members in 1966, which was made by sculptor Lim Yew Kuan and painter Chan Khun Yew. As chief scout and patron of the Boy Scouts and Girl Guides, he officiated the start of the Scout–Guide Week in February 1967. He was also the patron of the Singapore Red Cross Society, and attended the rally for World Red Cross Day. In April, he visited Jurong and spoke about the area's industrialism and the educational support given to the Malay community. He later visited Kampong Kembangan in October, which had undergone upgrading works such as paved roads and new housing blocks, leading him to comment on the multi-racialism and industrialisation in Singapore.

=== First term (1967–1970) ===
In Singapore's first presidential election in 1967, Yusof was unanimously elected by parliament to serve a four-year term. He received commendations from prime minister Lee and MPs Rahmat bin Kenap, Lim Guan Hoo, and S. Ramaswamy upon his successful election. He further received congratulations from French president Charles de Gaulle, Swiss president Roger Bonvin, Indian president Zakir Husain, Pakistani president Ayub Khan, and Shah of Iran Mohammad Reza Pahlavi. Yusof was sworn in on 4 December 1967. In February 1968, Yusof dissolved the first Parliament for the upcoming general election on the advice of the prime minister, for which he issued writs of election. He subsequently opened the second Parliament in May, where he delivered a speech which focused on the ministries of labour, education, communications, culture, and social affairs.

While on a tour in Australia in 1968, Yusof suffered a heart attack and was flown to Melbourne for treatment. He had boarded a cruise, the Australasia, at Port Moresby after having toured Australia for a week. He was sent to the Royal Melbourne Hospital, which he stayed at for ten days. At the hospital, the doctors described his condition as "a complication of illnesses and heart trouble". However, after he was better, Yusof continued his Australian tour with a physician and two aides, but returned to Singapore a week earlier than originally planned. While he was away, speaker Punch Coomaraswamy served as acting president. In 1969, he attended his father Ishak's funeral in Kuala Lumpur; he had previously visited him in the hospital in 1968. In January 1970, he laid the foundation stone for the Early Founders Memorial Stone at the waterfront opposite Fullerton Square.

== Death and funeral ==
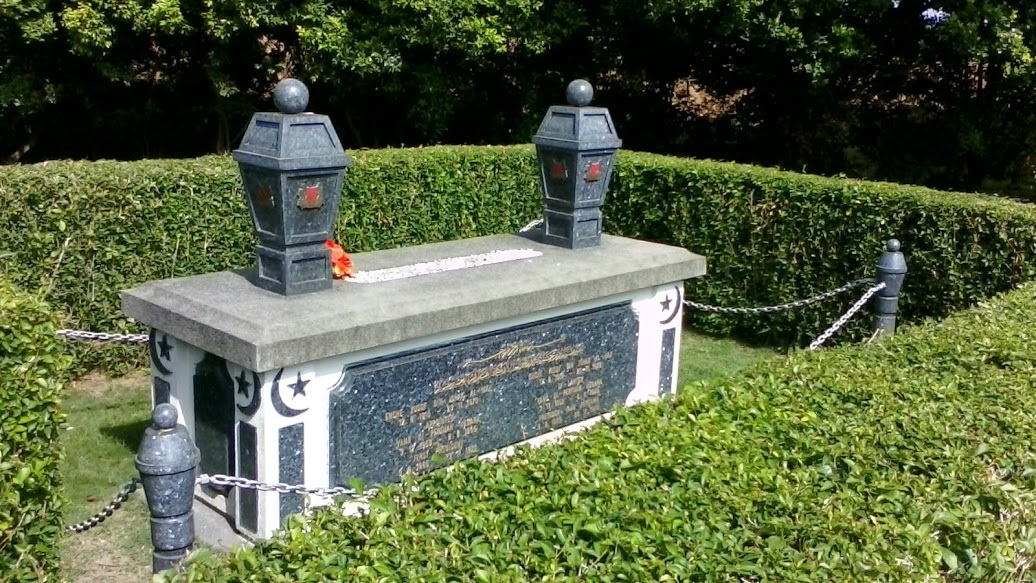
Yusof's tomb at Kranji State Cemetery

On 23 November 1970, Yusof died of heart failure at 7:30 a.m. at Outram Hospital (now known as the Singapore General Hospital). His death was announced sometime before 11 a.m., where flags were flown at half-mast and solemn music was broadcast on Radio Singapore. He had been admitted to the hospital on 21 November for respiratory and heart issues; it was his second admission to the hospital that month. Yusof had been struggling with his health since his heart attack in Australia in 1968. He was succeeded by Benjamin Sheares.

Yusof's body was laid in state at the Istana, where members of the cabinet including prime minister Lee Kuan Yew, speaker Yeoh Ghim Seng, communications minister Yong Nyuk Lin, foreign and labour minister S. Rajaratnam, health minister Chua Sian Chin, science and technology minister Toh Chin Chye, and defence minister Goh Keng Swee paid their respects. Yusof's cofffin was then brought from the Istana to City Hall, passing through Orchard and Stamford Road. Thousands of Singaporeans attended the procession of his coffin.

On 25 November, Yusof was buried with full state honours at 6:03 p.m. at Kranji State Cemetery. He received a 21-gun salute. Present at his funeral were Lee, Yusof's wife Noor Aishah, Yusof's brothers, Chief Justice Wee Chong Jin, and the rest of the cabinet. Foreign dignitaries present at his funeral included Indonesian foreign minister Adam Malik, governor of Penang Syed Sheh Barakbah, Malaysian health minister Sardon Jubir, and Filipino ambassador to Malaysia Romeo Busuego, representing the Philippines.

His funeral followed Islamic burial practices such as a hasty burial, which was requested by his family, but also saw women present during his burial, despite customs indicating that they should be absent. The arrangement saw input from officials of the Muslim Religious Council. They advised a specific spot for Yusof to be buried, but the government decided to bury him instead in a new national cemetery (the Kranji State Cemetery), of which Yusof was its first internment.

=== Reactions ===
Yang di-Pertuan Agong of Malaysia Abdul Halim of Kedah sent his condolences and stated that "[Singapore] has lost a leading statesman who has played a significant role in the progress achieved by the Republic since its birth in 1965". Yusof's predecessor as Yang di-Pertuan Negara Sir William Goode said "Singapore's many friends throughout the world will be deeply grieved to hear of the death of [Yusof]." Malaysian prime minister Abdul Razak Hussein stated that Yusof would "be recorded in history as the first Malay head of state of our neighbouring country".

Further tributes came from organisations such as the National Trades Union Congress, the Singapore Employers' Federation, the Singapore Chinese Chamber of Commerce, the Singapore Indian Chamber of Commerce, the International Chamber of Commerce, Nanyang University, and the Singapore Medical Association. Religious organisations in Singapore such as the Singapore Buddhist Federation, the Inter-Religious Organisation, St Andrew's Cathedral, and the Jewish Welfare Board held memorial services for Yusof.

Countries who paid respect to Yusof include Bulgaria, Thailand, Austria, Nauru, Brunei, Barbados, Italy, Ghana, Brazil, Argentina, Peru, China, South Korea, the Philippines, Zambia, Tonga, Vietnam, France, Peru, Indonesia, Panama, Khmer Republic, Turkey, Czechoslovak Socialist Republic, United Arab Republic, Japan, India, Trinidad and Tobago, Indonesia, Hungarian People's Republic, Nepal, German Democratic Republic, Lebanon, Norway, Sweden, Malta, and Nigeria. The United Nations held a minute of silence during a general assembly in honour of Yusof.

== Personal life and views ==
Yusof married his wife Noor Aishah Mohammad Salim (1933–2025) in 1949, when she was 16. He had only seen her in a photograph three days before their solemnisation. Together, they had three children, Orchid Kamariah, Imran Yusof, and Zuriana Yusof. Aishah was interviewed for the Channel NewsAsia documentary Daughters of Singapore in 2014, which commemorated the spouses of Yusof and David Marshall, two pioneer leaders of Singapore. One of Yusof's hobbies was photography, and a collection of his photographs was donated to the National Archives of Singapore by Aishah. Yusof was also interested in orchids.

During his presidency, he and his family lived at the secretary's bungalow, the Sri Melati, on the Istana's grounds, where he grew papayas and orchids. It was eventually demolished in the 1970s after his death, due to termite infestations. He also suffered from loneliness as president, since meeting with his friends involved a lengthy and complicated security process. Prime minister Lee was reported to have allowed culture minister Othman Wok to stay in a bungalow in the Istana's grounds to provide Yusof company, as they were close friends.

=== Education ===
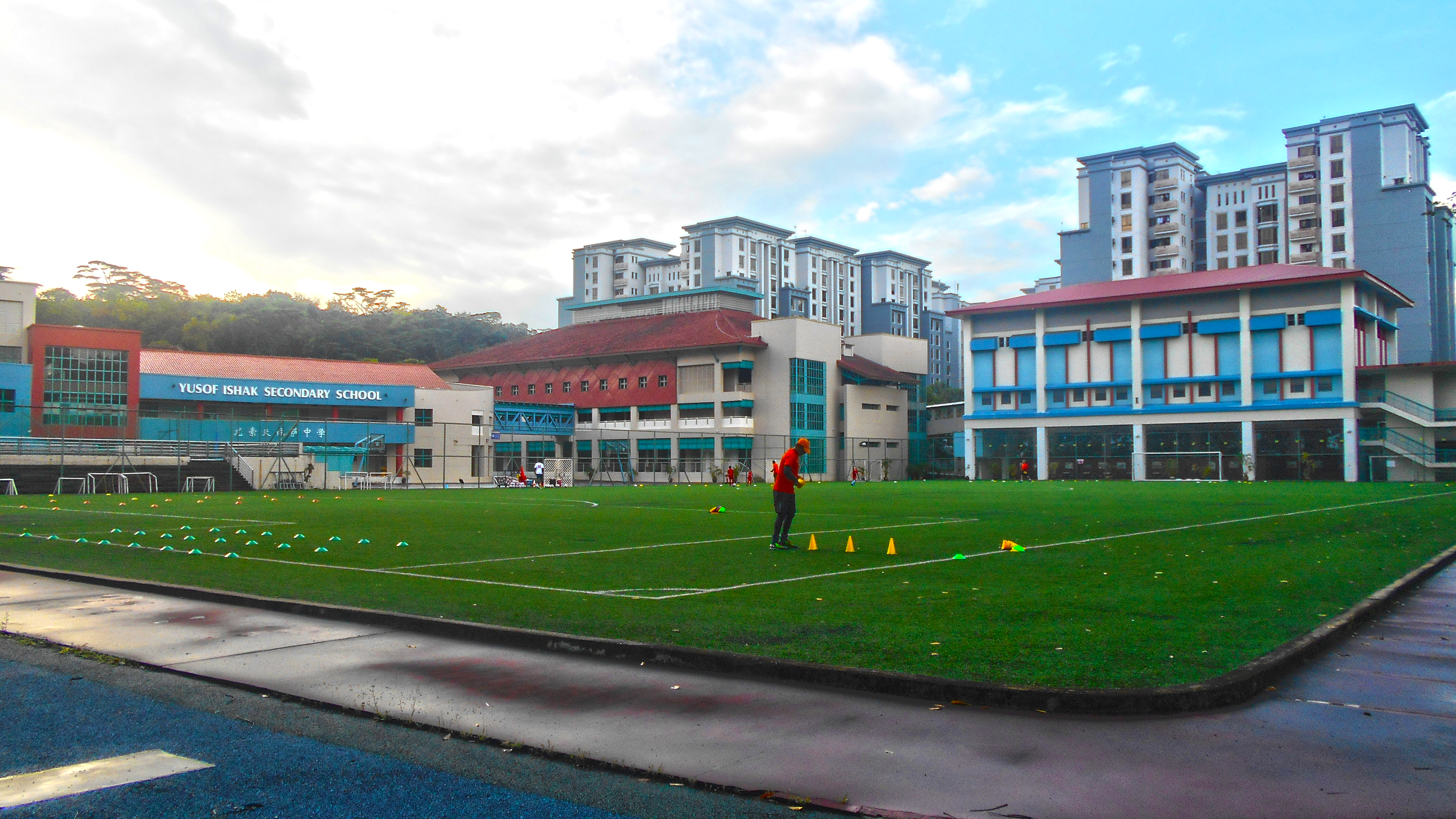
Yusof Ishak Secondary School in 2017

In the early 20th-century, Malay parents preferred not to send their children to English schools, in fear that their children might be converted to Christianity. Yusof, however, was English educated, as were his siblings and children. This gave him a lifelong appreciation of the importance of education. Yusof even told Aishah that, after he died, if she was unable to afford their children's educational fees, that she should rent out their house. In July 1966, a secondary school named after him was opened by prime minister Lee.

During his presidency, in July 1965, Yusof was made the chancellor of the National University of Singapore (NUS). At his installation, he stated that "if we do our best, [NUS] will be as illustrious as the name of this new nation already is in several fields of administration and enterprise." Over the next two years, he would acknowledge the university's high enrolment numbers in his speeches. Yusof also ignored stereotypes that Malays were lazy, instead encouraging more Malays to focus on their education. An interpretation of his views by Norshahril Saat of ISEAS – Yusof Ishak Institute were that Malays could become anything that they wanted; but they had to be the best in their field.

=== Religion ===
Yusof was raised in a "progressive religious tradition"; his father wanted his children to understand Islam outside of rituals and to include science in the study of religion. He wanted Islam to follow modern times, including how Islamic traditions could help solve modern problems. Yusof was a religious person in this regard, where he would visit different mosques weekly to pray. He performed the pilgrimage to Mecca in 1963. On 1965's Hari Raya Puasa, while Singapore was a part of Malaysia, he asked for respect between the different religions and for a progressive mindset. During his time at Utusan Melayu, Yusof encouraged open discussions on religion. Some debates that were carried out at Utusan include whether Friday sermons could be held in Malay instead of Arabic and whether girls should go to school instead of being homemakers. He would not take sides in these debates, despite his own religious beliefs. In 1950, when Utusan reported on Maria Hertogh, they kept their news objective instead of taking sides.

=== Multiculturalism ===
During his time as head of state, Yusof firmly believed in multiculturalism. While a part of Malaysia, he told Malay Singaporeans to identify as Malaysians first, then as Malays. Following the separation from Malaysia, Yusof encouraged Singaporeans to show that a multicultural society would be able to function. This was also a period where many Malays wanted to migrate to Malaysia, as they held more rights instead of being the minority in Singapore. He believed that Malay Singaporeans would be just as successful in Singapore, stating that "our common prosperity and our future, as a multiracial nation, rests on tolerance and national unity." In 1966, he stated that Singapore's multicultural identity was one of the factors towards Singapore's growth, and that the Malay community should try to integrate with Singapore.

== Legacy ==
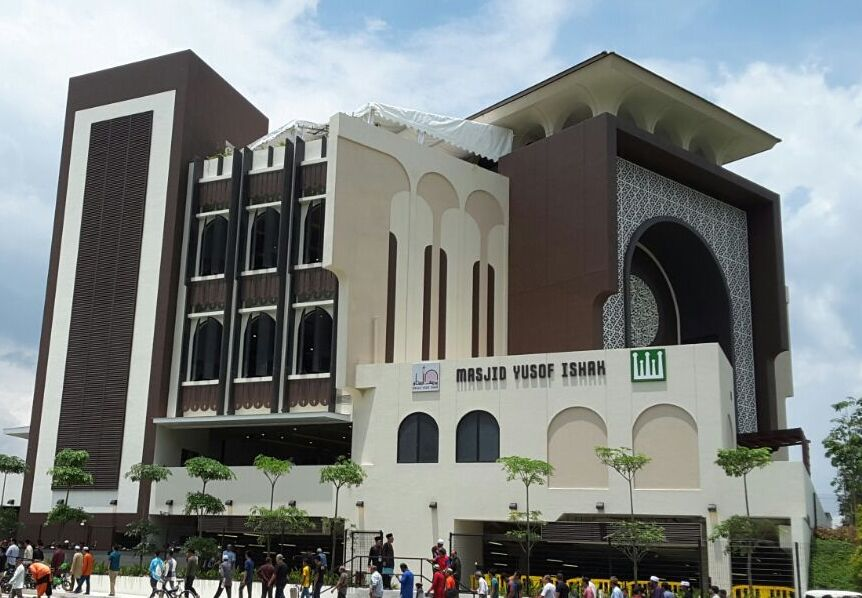
The Masjid Yusof Ishak in 2017

Several locations in Singapore bear Yusof's name. The Yusof Ishak Secondary School was opened by prime minister Lee on 29 July 1966, being renamed from Jubilee Integrated Secondary School. Following his death in 1970, eight years later, NUS renamed one of the buildings at its Kent Ridge campus as the Yusof Ishak House in honour of him. In 1995, finance minister Richard Hu announced that the new Singapore dollar notes, which were to be issued at the beginning of the 21st-century, would feature Yusof's presidential portrait on them. Known as the Portrait Series, they were issued in 1999, and are the current set of Singapore currency notes in circulation. A wax figure of Yusof was unveiled at Madame Tussauds Singapore's opening in 2014.

In August 2015, the Institute of Southeast Asian Studies (ISEAS) was officially renamed to the ISEAS – Yusof Ishak Institute on Yusof's 105th birthday. Its new name was to call to mind Yusof's "vision of equality, justice, harmony and strength amid diversity". For the celebration of Singapore's 50th anniversary of independence in 2015, Yusof was featured in all six of the SG50 Commemorative Notes. That same year, a play about him titled Yusof: A Presidential Portrait was commissioned by Esplanade for its annual Pesta Raya celebrations. It was directed by Zizi Azah Abdul Majid, and focused on his years with Utusan Melayu, as president, and his home life. Yusof was portrayed by Sani Hussin in its original run. In 2017, the Masjid Yusof Ishak was opened by his widow Noor Aishah. It was witnessed by guests including prime minister Lee Hsien Loong, minister-in-charge of Muslim affairs Yaacob Ibrahim, and Mufti Fatris Bakaram.

== Honours ==
In 1963, Yusof was given the Grand Commander of the Order of the Defender of the Realm, which allowed him the use of the honorific title Tun. However, in 1965, Singapore dropped the use of titles such as Tun following its separation from Malaysia. In 1969, Yusof was given an honorary degree of Doctor of Letters from NUS.

=== National ===
- Order of Temasek (First Class), in 1962.

=== Foreign ===
- Malaysia:
  - Grand Commander of the Order of the Defender of the Realm (S.M.N., Tun)
- Brunei:
  - Darjah Kerabat Laila Utama Yang Amat Dihormati (DK I, Dato Laila Utama), 1st Class
- United Kingdom:
  - Knight of the Order of St John

== See also ==
- Yusof Ishak Secondary School, a secondary school in Punggol named after him.
- Masjid Yusof Ishak, a mosque located in Woodlands named after him.

Political offices
Preceded by Sir William Allmond Codrington Goode	Head of State of Singapore; 1959–1970	Succeeded by Benjamin Sheares
Preceded by Sir William Allmond Codrington Goode	Yang di-Pertuan Negara of Singapore; 1959–1965	Position abolished Became President of Singapore
New office Previously Yang di-Pertuan Negara of Singapore	President of Singapore; 1965–1970	Succeeded by Benjamin Sheares
