= Singapore Portrait Series currency notes =

4th design of Singapore currency notes

Front of the $2, $10 and $50 Portrait Series notes

The Portrait Series of currency notes is the fourth and current set of notes to be issued for circulation in Singapore. It was first introduced on 9 September 1999 by the Board of Commissioners of Currency, Singapore (BCCS), whose role was since taken over by the Monetary Authority of Singapore (MAS) post-merger.

This series features the portrait of Yusof bin Ishak, the first president of Singapore. The design has been simplified and new security features were introduced. Polymer versions of this series were released for general circulation by MAS as of 4 May 2004.

== History ==
The Portrait Series was first released by the Board of Commissioners of Currency, Singapore (BCCS) on 9 September 1999 to welcome the new millennium, designed by local artist Eng Siak Loy. The series has a total of seven denominations in general circulation; the denominations $1 and $500 were not carried forward from the previous Ship Series. The colour for denominations up to $50 have been retained, a tradition kept since the era of the Malaya and British Borneo dollar. A more standardised approach is adopted across all banknote denominations, with features noticeably different from all previous series. For example, the watermark no longer features the lion head symbol. Due to design considerations, the dollar sign was considered redundant and is no longer included in this series. In addition, the note printing company no longer appears on any part of the portrait note.

In October 2002, the BCCS merged with the Monetary Authority of Singapore (MAS), which took over the responsibility of banknote issuance. On 4 May 2004, the MAS started issuing polymer versions of the S$10.00 note for general circulation; polymer versions of the S$2.00 and S$5.00 notes were subsequently released. Higher denomination banknotes (S$50.00, S$100.00, S$1,000 & S$10,000) are still printed on paper. The paper version of the lower denomination banknotes remain in active circulation alongside the polymer version, though the number of S$2.00 and S$5.00 paper notes have dwindled significantly since the introduction of polymer notes.

On 2 July 2014, the Monetary Authority of Singapore announced that it would stop printing S$10,000 notes starting from 1 October 2014, to reduce the risk of money laundering. MAS also stopped producing the S$1,000 banknote as well from 1 January 2021 onwards, with the same reason of withdrawing S$10,000 notes and because the demand of these notes was low except for bank account maintenance (currently the notes that are in high demand are S$50.00 and S$100.00 notes). The MAS said that the higher denomination notes (beyond $100) would continue to remain legal tender. Since 1 January 2009, $10,000 notes was decreasing in general demand whereas since 1 January 2019, $1,000 notes was decreasing in general demand that led to the withdrawal.

== Security features ==
The previous security features in the Ship Series were carried over to the Portrait Series, with new ones incorporated into the banknote. The two most prominent security features are the engraved portrait of Yusof bin Ishak (which contains fine lines that are difficult for counterfeiters to mimic) and the Kinegram (a printed security hologram); MAS states that banknotes with missing or mutilated portrait or/and Kinegram command no value. Paper versions issued by BCCS features its logo and the face value, while those issued by the MAS features its logo with the Merlion (a mythical creature and national symbol) and the face value. Polymer versions of the banknote have the Kinegram replaced by an image of the Singapore lion symbol with the face value, showing the coat of arms of Singapore when tilted at varying degrees.

Other security features include lithographic print (the resulting background hinders camera counterfeiting), anti-copying line structures, perfect registration, microprinting, asymmetrical serial numbers and windowed security threads (thin ribbons woven into the paper). Polymer versions of the banknote include two clear windows and other security features that substitute its paper version. Several features that are invisible to the naked eye appear when both versions of the banknote are exposed under UV light.

== Banknotes in general circulation ==
The banknote's obverse features the portrait of the first president of Singapore, Yusof bin Ishak, and the reverse contain secondary themes that are linked to his life. The background on the obverse of the Portrait Series feature a different cowrie (sea snail whose shell was often used as currency) for each denomination. The banknotes are signed by the BCCS chairman and later by the MAS chairman, and the signatories include former Finance Minister Richard Hu, Senior Minister (and former Finance Minister) Lee Hsien Loong, former Senior Minister Goh Chok Tong, and President (former Deputy Prime Minister and Finance Minister) Tharman Shanmugaratnam.

=== $2 banknote ===
The money cowrie is featured on the obverse background of the $2 banknote. Its reverse carries the theme of education and features three buildings, the Victoria Bridge School (now known as Victoria School), Old Raffles Institution Building at Bras Basah Road, and College of Medicine Building. Yusof received his primary education in 1923 at Victoria Bridge School, and his secondary education in Raffles Institution; His father, Ishak bin Ahmad insisted that his children be English-educated. He was also the Chancellor of the National University of Singapore between 1965 and 1970.

=== $5 banknote ===
The gold-ringed cowrie is featured on the obverse background of the $5 banknote. Its reverse carries the theme of Garden City and features the 200-year-old tembusu tree at Singapore Botanic Gardens, as well as Singapore's national flower Vanda Miss Joaquim. Yusof was a keen-gardener who once made a living growing Orchids in Gombak, Kuala Lumpur before his appointment as president.

=== $10 banknote ===
The wandering cowrie is featured on the obverse background of the $10 banknote, the most-commonly found cowrie in Singapore. Its reverse carries the theme of sports and features sportsmen playing badminton, soccer, sailing, jogging and swimming. Yusof was an active sportsman in his secondary school days, and won the national boxing title and the lightweight weightlifting championship. The $10 banknote was the first denomination in the series printed in polymer. 10 million bills were first released to the general public as a trial, and were the first in Singapore to be successfully dispensed from Automated teller machines (ATMs) and be used in payment involving machines. With the successful trial, MAS decided to release polymer versions of the $2, $5 and $10 for circulation.

=== $50 banknote ===
The cylindrical cowrie is featured on the obverse background of the $50 banknote. Its reverse carries the theme of Arts and features two paintings and four musical instruments. The pipa, kompang, veena and violin represent the musical instruments for different cultures in Singapore. Cheong Soo Pieng (creator of Drying Salted Fish) and Chen Wen Hsi (creator of Gibbons Fetching the Moon from the Water) are two artists who created a new type of fine arts in Singapore that influenced other local artists, in which their two paintings are featured.

=== $100 banknote ===
The swallow cowrie is featured on the obverse background of the $100 banknote. Its reverse carries the theme of youth and features a National Service officer with his ceremonial sword standing against the tower of the SAFTI Military Institute, uniformed youths representing Singapore Red Cross, St John's Ambulance Brigade, Singapore Scout Association and the National Police Cadet Corps.

=== $1,000 banknote ===
The beautiful cowrie is featured on the obverse background of the $1,000 banknote. Its reverse carries the theme of government featuring the buildings of the three branches of government: The Parliament House, Old Supreme Court Building and Istana, representing the Legislative, Judiciary and Executive powers respectively. The Istana is the president's official residence, built in 1869 which first housed the colonial governor. The entire national anthem's lyrics are included as microprint, which is a unique feature to the $1,000 banknote.

=== $10,000 banknote ===
$10,000 note front

The onyx cowrie is featured on the obverse background of the $10,000 banknote. Its reverse carries the theme of economy featuring Singapore as a knowledge-based economy – biotechnology, R&D and silicon wafer.

It was one of the highest-value banknote in the world in terms of absolute value (worth approximately US$7,250 as of July 2022) that was in public circulation.

== Commemorative banknotes ==
=== Millennium $2 banknote ===
In celebration of the Millennium 2000, five million $2 bills were printed with the Millennium 2000 logo replacing the prefix of the serial number normally found in other notes under general circulation.

=== Overprinted banknotes ===
Three commemorative limited issues have been made for the Portrait Series (including the $20 issue below). 10,000 sets of the $10 polymer was issued with the overprint 'Commemorative First Issue by MAS' with the prefix MAS. 5,000 sets of $50 banknotes signed by PM Lee Hsien Loong have been stamped with overprint commemorating the merger of the BCCS and MAS.

=== $20 banknote ===
On 27 June 2007, the governments of Singapore and Brunei celebrated the 40th anniversary of the Currency Interchangeability Agreement (an agreement allowing citizens of both countries to use currency from either nation interchangeably) by issuing commemorative $20 notes, that are yellow, 149 × 72 mm in size, and made of polymer. The obverse of the Singaporean version is similar to the current Portrait Series, whereas the obverse of the Brunei version is similar to the $50 and $100 of the 2004 series. The reverses are almost identical except that the Brunei version has their state title in Jawi script, while the Singaporean version has the state title of Brunei in Latin script.

A limited edition set was offered for sale, which consisted of both versions in a folder, with matching serial numbers. The notes have "40th Anniversary Currency Interchangeability Agreement" overprinted on the obverse side. In addition, the Singaporean version has the two countries' state crests above the commemorative text. Only 12,000 sets were available, 10,000 from the Monetary Authority of Singapore, and 2,000 from the Brunei Currency and Monetary Board. The circulation version was made available from 16 July 2007.

=== SG50 banknotes ===
Five $10 and one $50 polymer commemorative banknotes were made available from 20 August 2015. They are part of Singapore's Golden Jubilee (SG50) celebrations. 20 million pieces were printed for the $50 commemorative SG50 banknote, while 15 million pieces of each $10 commemorative SG50 design banknote were printed. There was an oversupply of these SG50 banknotes; by February 2016 only about less than half of them were actually issued.

== Specifications ==
4th Series – Portrait Series (1999–present)
Value	Dimensions	Main Colour	Description		Date of issue	Status	Material
Value	Dimensions	Main Colour	Obverse	Reverse	Date of issue	Status	Material
$2	126 × 63 mm	Purple	President Yusof bin Ishak, Money Cowrie	Education	9 September 1999	Richard Hu (September 1999) and Lee Hsien Loong (January 2005)	Paper
$2	126 × 63 mm	Purple	President Yusof bin Ishak, Money Cowrie	Education	12 January 2006	Goh Chok Tong (January 2006) and Tharman Shanmugaratnam (2014)	Polymer
$5	133 × 66 mm	Green	President Yusof bin Ishak, Gold-Ringed Cowrie	Garden City	9 September 1999	Richard Hu (September 1999) and Lee Hsien Loong (August 2004)	Paper
$5	133 × 66 mm	Green	President Yusof bin Ishak, Gold-Ringed Cowrie	Garden City	18 May 2007	Goh Chok Tong (May 2007) and Tharman Shanmugaratnam (2014)	Polymer
$10	141 × 69 mm	Red	President Yusof bin Ishak, Wandering Cowrie	Sports	9 September 1999	Richard Hu (September 1999) and Lee Hsien Loong (May 2004)	Paper
$10	141 × 69 mm	Red	President Yusof bin Ishak, Wandering Cowrie	Sports	4 May 2004	Lee Hsien Loong (May 2005), Goh Chok Tong (January 2008) and Tharman Shanmugaratnam (2015)	Polymer
$50	156 × 74 mm	Blue	President Yusof bin Ishak, Cylindrical Cowrie	Arts	9 September 1999	Richard Hu (September 1999), Lee Hsien Loong (March 2002), Goh Chok Tong (November 2009) and Tharman Shanmugaratnam (July 2012)	Paper
$100	162 × 77 mm	Orange	President Yusof bin Ishak, Swallow Cowrie	Youth	9 September 1999	Richard Hu (September 1999), Goh Chok Tong (November 2009) and Tharman Shanmugaratnam (March 2013)	Paper
$1,000	170 × 83 mm	Pink	President Yusof bin Ishak, Beautiful Cowrie	Government	9 September 1999	Richard Hu (September 1999) and Goh Chok Tong (November 2009). No longer issued from January 2021 due to low demand.	Paper
$10,000	180 × 90 mm	Gold	President Yusof bin Ishak, Onyx Cowrie	Economics	9 September 1999	Richard Hu (September 1999). No longer issued from October 2014 due to low demand.	Paper
