= William Goode (colonial administrator) =

British colonial administrator

Sir William Goode GCMG KStJ
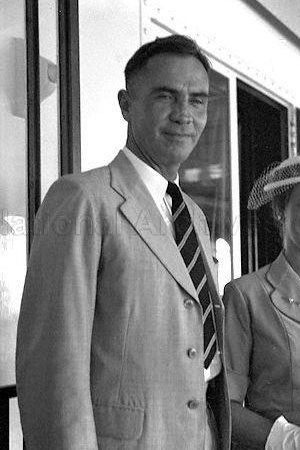
- Goode in 1953

23rd Governor of North Borneo
- In office 21 April 1960 – 15 September 1963
- Monarch: Elizabeth II
- Preceded by: Roland Turnbull
- Succeeded by: Office abolished

1st Yang di-Pertuan Negara of Singapore
- In office 3 June 1959 – 2 December 1959
- Monarch: Elizabeth II
- Prime Minister: Lee Kuan Yew
- Preceded by: Position established
- Succeeded by: Yusof Ishak

4th Governor of Singapore
- In office 9 December 1957 – 2 June 1959
- Monarch: Elizabeth II
- Chief Minister: Lim Yew Hock
- Preceded by: Robin Black
- Succeeded by: Office abolished

1st Chief Secretary of Singapore
- In office February 1955 – 9 December 1957
- Monarch: Elizabeth II
- Preceded by: Office established
- Succeeded by: Edgeworth David

3rd Colonial Secretary of Singapore
- In office 30 July 1953 – February 1955
- Monarch: Elizabeth II
- Preceded by: W. L. Blythe
- Succeeded by: Office abolished

Personal details
- Born: William Allmond Codrington Goode; 8 June 1907 Twickenham, Middlesex, England
- Died: 15 September 1986 (aged 79) Goring-on-Thames, Oxfordshire, England
- Spouses: Mary Harding (m. 1938; died 1947) Ena Mary McLaren (m. 1950)
- Children: 1
- Parent: Richard Allmond Jeffrey Goode (father)
- Education: Oakham School; Worcester College, Oxford

Sir William Allmond Codrington Goode GCMG KStJ (8 June 1907 – 15 September 1986) was a British colonial administrator who served as Governor of Singapore from 1957 to 1959, Yang di-Pertuan Negara of Singapore in 1959, and Governor of North Borneo from 1960 to 1963.

== Early life ==
Goode was born in Twickenham, Middlesex, on 8 June 1907 as the son of Sir Richard Goode. He attended Oakham School and Worcester College, Oxford.

== Career ==
Goode joined the Malayan Civil Service in 1931, studying law in his spare time. He was admitted to the bar by Gray's Inn in 1936. From 1936 to 1939 he served as district officer, Raub, and thereafter as assistant financial secretary of Singapore in 1939. He was appointed assistant commissioner for civil defence, Singapore in 1940, serving in the Singapore Volunteer Corps as a lance corporal during the Second World War. After the colony's capitulation in 1942, he was taken prisoner by the Japanese and sent to work in Siam on the Burma Railway from 1943 to 1945. He remained in Malaya after the war, and in 1948 became deputy economic secretary to the Federation. In 1949 he was posted to Aden as chief secretary, where he also acted as governor from 1950 to 1951. He returned to Singapore as colonial secretary in 1953 and became the colony's last British governor in 1957. In 1959, as part of transitional arrangements, he was made Yang di-Pertuan Negara of the State of Singapore from June to December, and United Kingdom Commissioner. From 1960 to 1963 he was the last governor and Commander-in-Chief of North Borneo. During negotiations on the formation of Malaysia Goode supported the idea of British governors remaining in North Borneo and Sarawak for a transitional period, suggesting this would increase support for federation within the two territories. This was rejected by the Malayan government. Goode also criticised Fuad Stephens, then leader of the United National Kadazan Organisation political party, when Stephens voiced support for a 1963 federation date.

== Awards and honours ==
He was invested with Companion of the Order of St Michael and St George (CMG) in the 1952 New Year Honours and Knight Commander of the Order of St Michael and St George (KCMG) in 1957.

He was knighted with Order of the Hospital of Saint John of Jerusalem (KStJ) in 1958.

He was made Grand Commander of the Order of St Michael and St George (GCMG) in the 1963 New Year Honours shortly before his retirement to Berkshire, England.

== Personal life ==
In 1938, Goode married Mary Harding. She died in 1947 and three years later he married Ena Mary McLaren.

Goode died in Goring-on-Thames in 1986, aged 79.

Government offices
Preceded by W. L. Blythe	Colonial Secretary of Singapore; 1953-1955	Position abolished
New title	Chief Secretary of Singapore; 1955-1957	Succeeded by Edgeworth David
Preceded by Sir Robin Black	Governor of Singapore; 1957–1959	Office abolished
Political offices
New title	Yang di-Pertuan Negara of Singapore; 1959	Succeeded by Yusof Ishak
Government offices
Preceded by Sir Roland Turnbull	Governor of North Borneo; 1960–1963	Office abolished
