= Masjid Yusof Ishak =

Mosque in Woodlands, Singapore

Yusof Ishak Mosque Masjid Yusof Ishak
- مسجد يوسف إسحاق
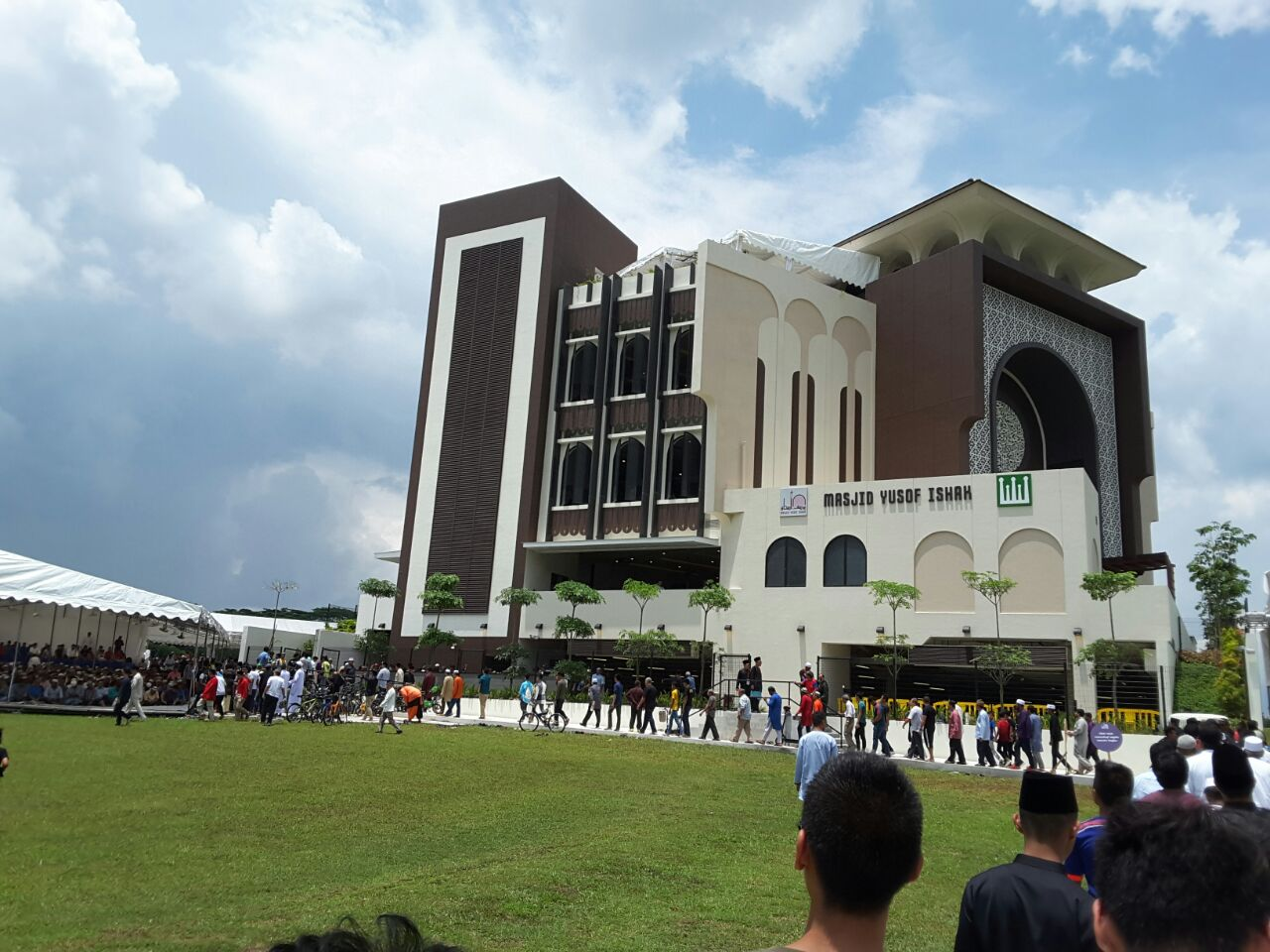
- Masjid Yusof Ishak.

Religion
- Affiliation: Islam
- Branch/tradition: Sunni Islam

Location
- Location: 10 Woodlands Drive 17; Singapore 737740
- Country: Singapore
- Interactive map of Yusof Ishak Mosque; Masjid Yusof Ishak
- Coordinates: 1.4265°N 103.7963°E

Architecture
- Type: Mosque
- Style: Islamic architecture, Nusantara Heritage
- Established: 14 April 2017; 9 years ago
- Completed: 2017; 9 years ago
- Construction cost: S$18 million
- Capacity: 4,500

The Yusof Ishak Mosque (Malay: Masjid Yusof Ishak) is a mosque in Woodlands, Singapore. It was announced by Prime Minister, Lee Hsien Loong during the 2013 National Day Rally The mosque is located at 10 Woodlands Drive 17, Singapore 737740. The mosque is named after Singapore's first President, Yusof Ishak.

The mosque officially opened to public on 14 April 2017 by the former President's widow, Madam Noor Aisha, witnessed by guests including Prime Minister Lee Hsien Loong and Minister-in-charge of Muslim Affairs, Yaacob Ibrahim.

== Architectural characteristics ==
Costing over $18 million, Masjid Yusof Ishak is the 26th mosque to be built under the Mosque Building and Mendaki Fund programme. The design and architecture of the mosque were inspired by President Ishak's official and private residences. Moreover, it blends traditional mosque characteristics with the heritage of the "Malay world", the Nusantara. Unlike typical mosques, it doesn't have huge pillars or dome. Having instead, a very contemporary look and feel of a "Malay house".

The prayer space can accommodate 4,500 people with facilities to cater to the needs of the elderly. Other facilities also include a multi-purpose hall, a conference room, a sizeable auditorium, seminar rooms for teaching purposes and a roof terrace.

== Transportation ==
The mosque is accessible from Woodlands South MRT station.

== See also ==
- Islam in Singapore
