= Syed Esa Almenoar =

Singaporean politician

Tan Sri Syed Esa Almenoar (1918 – 4 November 1994) was a Singaporean politician. He was Secretary-General of the Singapore Malay National Organisation between 1961 and 1965.

== Early life and education ==
Syed Esa was born in 1918 or around 1920, Singapore, to an Arab family. He studied in Victoria Bridge School and Raffles Institution. Syed Esa then studied law at Middle Temple, England, in 1937, but returned to Singapore at the outbreak of war. During the war, he served in the Malayan Auxiliary Service at the Yong Eng School depot. He also worked as an assistant librarian in the Supreme Court. He took his Cambridge Special Certificate (senior) examination at the end of 1935 and received his pass in March 1936.

After the war, in June 1946, Syed Esa resumed his law studies in England. He was called to the English Bar two years later. In September 1948, he returned to Singapore. Six years after, he was called to the Federation Bar.

== Career ==
=== Legal career ===
From 1948 to 1952, Syed Esa worked at S Pillai & Ibrahim. From 1952 to 1968, he worked at Ibrahim & Almenoar. Thereafter, he worked at Almenoar & Company.

Syed Esa was chairman of the Johore Bar from 1966 to 1967.

=== Political career ===
Syed Esa joined the Singapore Malay National Organisation (PKMS) when it began in SIngapore in the early 1950s as a branch of the UMNO in Malaya.

Syed Esa was part of PKMS' first electoral contest with the 1953 Singapore City Council election. The party contested three seats and lost all. Syed Esa ran in the East Constituency against independent candidate Mak Pak Shee and Syed Hassan Al-Junied of the Progressive Party. Syed Esa lost the contest with 634 votes (15.1%), Syed Hassan Al-Junied received 1,409 votes (33.5%) and Mak won the seat with 2,164 votes (51.4%).

Syed Esa eventually became Secretary-General of PKMS and contested the 1963 Singaporean general election. He ran in the Changi Constituency under the Singapore Alliance Party banner. In a four-horse race, Syed Esa received 1,975 votes (17.57%) and was the third highest votes garnered. The winner was the People's Action Party's Sim Boon Woo with 4,808 votes (42.78%).

== Death ==
He died on 4 November 1994.
