= Yang di-Pertuan Negara of Singapore =

Singapore former head of state

Yang di-Pertuan Negara of State of Singapore
- Yang di-Pertuan Negara Singapura
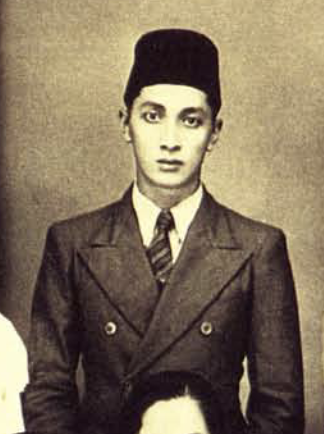
- Yusof Ishak c. 1933
- Head of state of the State of Singapore
- Style: His Excellency
- Type: Head of state
- Status: defunct
- Residence: Istana Negara Singapura
- Appointer: Elizabeth II (1959–1963) Putra of Perlis (1963–1965)
- Term length: Six years, renewable
- Constituting instrument: State of Singapore Constitution (1959)
- Precursor: Governor of Singapore
- Formation: 3 June 1959; 67 years ago
- First holder: William Goode
- Final holder: Yusof Ishak
- Abolished: 9 August 1965; 61 years ago
- Superseded by: President of Singapore

The Yang di-Pertuan Negara of Singapore was a title for the head of the State of Singapore from 1959 to 1965. Following the state's independence from Malaysia on 9 August 1965 to became the Republic of Singapore, the title was changed to President of Singapore.

== History ==
Following revisions to the Constitution in 1959, which granted the former Colony of Singapore self-governance from the United Kingdom as the State of Singapore, the ceremonial office of Yang di-Pertuan Negara replaced the colonial-era office of Governor as the representative of Elizabeth II, the British monarch, in Singapore.

Under a transitional arrangement, the last Governor of Singapore, Sir William Goode, served as the first Yang di-Pertuan Negara from 3 June to 3 December 1959. He was succeeded by Yusof Ishak, who was sworn into office on the same day as the country's state flag, coat of arms, and national anthem were adopted.

Initially, the office bearer was sometimes referred to as "Head of State". This was despite him constitutionally only a de facto, not de jure, head of state, acting as a vice-regal representative in lieu of a typical Governor-General.

The title was retained on 31 August 1963 when Singapore declared independence from the United Kingdom and acceded to Malaysia as a state on 16 September 1963. The officeholder then acted as the vice-regal representative of the Yang di-Pertuan Agong of Malaysia, reappointed by Putra of Perlis at his own discretion, after the consultation the Prime Minister of Singapore Lee Kuan Yew.

On 9 August 1965, Singapore was separated from the federation to become an independent state within the Commonwealth of Nations. On 22 December of that year, the Constitution was amended to make the country a republic as the Republic of Singapore, and the title of Yang di-Pertuan Negara was changed to President with retroactive effect from the date of independence.

== List of officeholders ==
№	Portrait	Name (Born–Died)	Term of Office			Origin	Background or Previous Appointment	Monarch	Ref
№	Portrait	Name (Born–Died)	Took office	Left office	Duration	Origin	Background or Previous Appointment	Monarch	Ref
1		Sir William Goode (1907–1986)	3 June 1959	2 December 1959	5 months	Middlesex, England	Chief Secretary of Singapore, Governor of Singapore	Elizabeth II	
2		Yusof Ishak (1910–1970)	3 December 1959	9 August 1965	5 years, 9 months	Taiping, Perak	Chairman of the Public Service Commission of Singapore	Elizabeth II (Until 15 September 1963) Putra of Perlis (From 16 September 1963)	
