= State of Singapore (Malaysia) =

1963–1965 Singaporean statehood in Malaysia

State of Singapore Negeri Singapura (Malay) 新加坡州 (Chinese) சிங்கப்பூர் (Tamil)
- State of Malaysia
- 1963–1965
- Flag Coat of arms

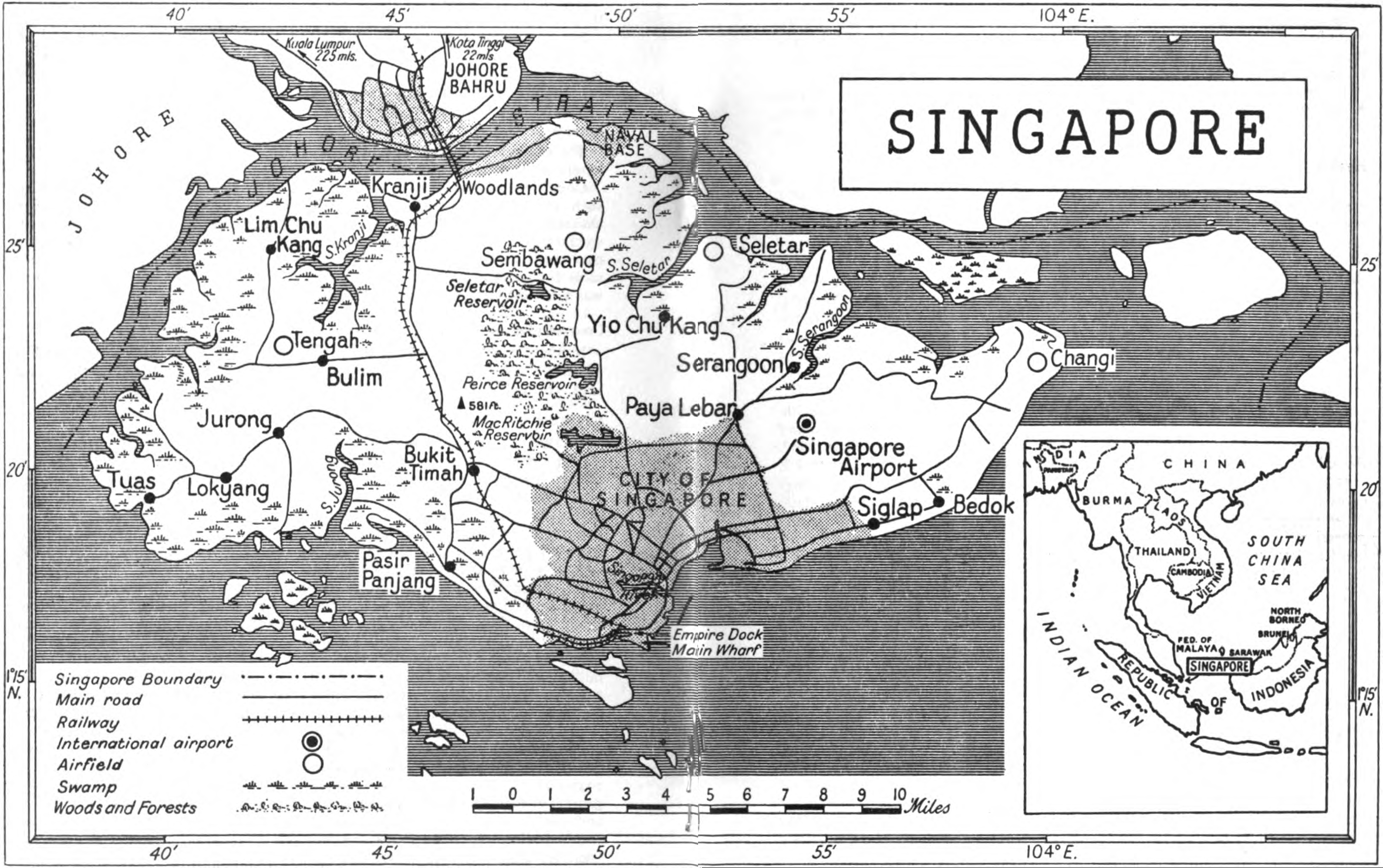
- A 1959 map of Singapore by the British Information Services, 4 years before the merger

Anthem
- Majulah Singapura
- Capital: City of Singapore 1.30°N 103.85°E
- Area
  - 1964: 581.5 km^{2} (224.5 sq mi)
- Population
  - 1964: 1,841,600
- Government
  - Type: Parliamentary government within a federal monarchy
- Yang di-Pertuan Negara
  - 1963–1965: Yusof Ishak
- Prime Minister
  - 1963–1965: Lee Kuan Yew
- Legislature: Legislative Assembly
- Historical era: Konfrontasi, Cold War
  - Independence from the United Kingdom declared: 31 August 1963
  - Federated into Malaysia: 16 September 1963
  - Separation and Independence from Malaysia declared: 9 August 1965
| Preceded by | Succeeded by |
| State of Singapore (1959–1963) | Republic of Singapore |

Singapore, (Note: Malay: Singapura; Chinese: 新加坡; Tamil: சிங்கப்பூர்) officially the State of Singapore, (Note: Malay: Negeri Singapura; Chinese: 新加坡州; Tamil: சிங்கப்பூர், romanized: Ciṅkappūr) was one of the 14 states of Malaysia from 16 September 1963 to 9 August 1965. At the time of merger, Singapore was a British colony (having achieved self-governance in 1959) and had previously been part of the Straits Settlements until 1946. As part of Malaysia, Singapore was the smallest state with a land area of 581.5 km^{2} (224.5 sq mi) but had the largest population of 1.82 million. (Note: Following separation, Perlis is Malaysia's smallest state at 819 km^{2} (316 sq mi).)

Malaysia was formed on 16 September 1963 through the merger of the Federation of Malaya with the former British colonies of North Borneo (Sabah), Sarawak and Singapore. The merger was supported by the British, Malayan and Singaporean leaders as a measure to counter communist influence in Southeast Asia. Through the 1962 integration referendum and the Malaysia Agreement, Singapore was given higher autonomy in education and labour, with the Federal Government in Kuala Lumpur overseeing defence and external affairs. Singapore was allocated only 15 seats in the Dewan Rakyat, and a reciprocal arrangement prevented citizens on either side from voting or contesting in the other's elections. These constitutional rules ensured the island's autonomy while limiting the influence of Singapore's Chinese-majority population on national politics.

However, political, racial and economic conflicts soon emerged between the governments of Singapore and Malaysia, led by the People's Action Party (PAP) and the Alliance Party respectively. Despite the agreement, both sides contested in each other's arenas: the Singapore branch of the Alliance in 1963, and the PAP in 1964. Furthermore, communal tensions between the Malay and Chinese populations in Singapore led to race riots later that year. The PAP's criticisms of the Federal Government's tax proposals in 1964 and the delay in Sabah development loans led to threats from then Finance Minister for Malaysia Tan Siew Sin to raise Singapore's revenue contribution from 40 to 60 per cent. Despite negotiations at constitutional rearrangements, Malaysian prime minister Tunku Abdul Rahman opted to resolve the disagreements by separating Singapore from the Federation, a decision supported by Singapore's finance minister Goh Keng Swee and a few PAP leaders. The Separation Agreement was signed on 7 August 1965, and Singapore became a sovereign state on 9 August.

Following separation, Malaysia supported Singapore's entry into the United Nations and the British Commonwealth. Both nations continued to share a national carrier, Malaysian Airways – renamed Malaysia–Singapore Airlines in 1966 – until the airline's split in 1971. The Singapore dollar and the Malaysian ringgit, along with the Brunei dollar, were also interchangeable with each other under the Currency Interchangeability Agreement until Malaysia withdrew in 1973. The historical narrative, particularly in Singapore due to limited public information, taught that the country had been abruptly expelled from Malaysia. This perception was shaped by a lack of detail regarding the separation talks and the sudden announcement of independence. The public release of the Albatross file in December 2025, containing Goh's records of the negotiations, provides a fuller account.

== History ==
=== Post-war British Singapore ===
Singapore returned to British rule following the end of World War II in 1945, during which it was occupied by the Japanese. In September that year, Singapore became the headquarters of the British Military Administration under Lord Louis Mountbatten. While the British had decided to form the Malayan Union comprising both the federated and unfederated Malay states as well as the former Straits Settlements of Penang and Malacca in 1946, no clear administrative arrangements were made for Singapore. Despite objections from colonial officials and businessmen who warned that separating Singapore would damage Malaya economically, the Colonial Office argued that any future union should be voluntary rather than imposed on communities with divergent interests. The inclusion of Singapore in the Malayan Union was opposed by Malay nationalists, who viewed Singapore's Chinese-majority population as a "threat" to the political and social position of the Malays in Malaya. (Note: In 1957, the Chinese in Singapore made up 75% of Singapore's population of 1,446,000. If Singapore and Malaya were to merge, the Malays (including indigenous groups) would have constituted 43%, compared to the Chinese 44.3%.)

The British began planning to consolidate their colonies into a larger federation anchored on Malaya, a strategy known as the "Grand Design", which Selkirk, the High Commissioner of the United Kingdom to Singapore, described as the "ultimate aim of British policy in Southeast Asia". The plan sought to maintain British influence during decolonisation while countering communist threats in the region. As Singapore gained self-governance, many local leaders viewed merger with Malaya as the city-state's only viable future, with independence disregarded as an unrealistic option. Despite overtures by Singapore's chief ministers David Marshall and Lim Yew Hock towards Malayan leader Tunku Abdul Rahman, Tunku was not keen in bringing Singapore into the Malayan Union.

The People's Action Party (PAP), led by Lee Kuan Yew, formed Singapore's fully-elected government after their victory in the 1959 Singaporean general election. The PAP and Lee continued to press for merger, which Singaporean historians cited by Tan Tai Yong attribute in part to the party's political difficulties. Lee believed that curbing the PAP's militant left-wing faction would help secure the Tunku's support for merger, yet without merger he lacked the means to defeat the faction. To reassure the Tunku and address Malay concerns in Malaya over Singapore's Chinese-majority population, the PAP established a Malay Affairs Bureau headed by Othman Wok and an Internal Security Council to oversee internal security in self-governing Singapore. In addition, to encourage a "pan-Malayan outlook" in Singapore and to show acceptance of the Malays' special status, Singapore adopted Malay as its national language, a Malay-language national anthem and appointed Yusof Ishak, an ethnic Malay, as Singapore's head of state.

=== Merger negotiations ===
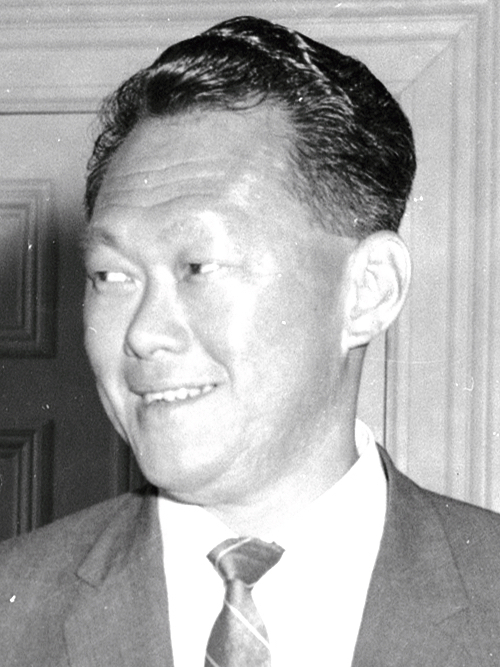
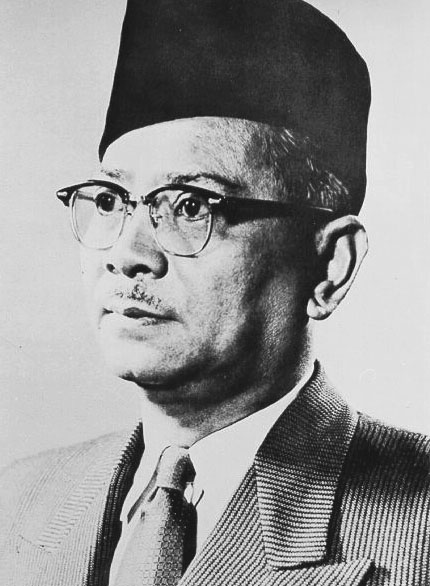
Lee Kuan Yew, the Prime Minister of Singapore, and Tunku Abdul Rahman, the Prime Minister of Malaysia

In May 1961, the Tunku announced the idea of a larger union, which would also include the Borneo Territories of Sabah, Sarawak and Brunei. (Note: Brunei eventually rejected to form Malaysia due to differences over oil revenues, financial contributions, oil taxation, and Brunei's expected position at the end of the order of precedence for all Malaysian sultans (due to it being the last to join).) According to Selkirk, Lee had been advocating a merger through a broader political association that included Borneo. Lee had also circulated his paper on the British "Grand Design", warning the British and Malayan authorities that abandoning merger could allow power in Singapore to fall to a group aligned with communist China, thereby threatening British interests and security in Southeast Asia. Historians Tan Tai Yong and Mohammad Noordin Sopiee believed that the challenges to Lee's leadership, particularly PAP's losses in the 1961 by-elections, compelled the Tunku to reevaluate his opposition to Singapore's inclusion in the Federation, as he acknowledged that an independent Singapore under communist control would pose problems for Malaya. Incorporating Singapore into Malaya would allow the Tunku to directly address the communist threat in Singapore as an internal security issue.

Following a meeting between Lee and Tunku in August 1961, both agreed that Singapore would retain local autonomy on education and labour, with Malaya responsible for security, defence and external affairs. In response to the announcement, David Marshall of the Workers Party called for the Legislative Assembly to convene immediately to debate the merger, while the Barisan Sosialis (BS) condemned Lee's actions as "most irresponsible", accusing him of attempting to "cut a deal" over Singapore's constitutional future with Malaysia. The BS also called for "complete merger" or a confederal relationship that would allow Singapore to retain control over internal security. However, Lee regarded the BS's demands as attempts to "prevent [the PAP] from settling fair terms and conditions for merger". From 13 September to 9 October, Lee delivered a series of radio talks aimed at persuading the electorate of the proposed merger arrangements. On 21 September, finance minister Goh Keng Swee announced that a referendum would be held on merger with Malaya. Goh also warned that "complete merger" would strip half of Singapore's electorate of their political rights, as they would not qualify for Malaysian citizenship.

On 16 October, the Tunku compared his envisioned relationship between Malaysia and Singapore as similar to that between the United Kingdom and Northern Ireland, with local autonomy in all areas except security, defence and external affairs. A draft of the White Paper on merger was completed on 26 October, with the merger date set for June 1963. Although the White Paper provided for a common nationality for Singapore and Malayan citizens, Singapore's residents would hold a differentiated form of citizenship after the merger. This arrangement was intended to restrict voting in their respective territories. However, the BS and other opposition groups derided the proposal as a one-sided arrangement against Singaporeans' interests, warning that Singapore citizens would be relegated to "second-class" status within Malaysia. They further argued that, while the Borneo territories were granted both federal citizenship and autonomy in certain areas, the PAP had traded away Singapore's rights for what they described as "illusory autonomy" in labour and education.

Lee argued in an aide-memoire to the Tunku that Singapore should be offered the same terms as the Borneo Territories and proposed renaming "Singapore Citizen (National of the new Federation)" to "Citizen of the new Federation (Singapore)", which Lee believed would secure "a major psychological victory" among the Singaporean Chinese. Although the change was largely nominal and voting rights remained restricted, the Malayan delegation in London accepted it, granting Singapore citizens all other federal rights in Malaysia. On 14 August 1962, Lee announced that all Singaporean citizens would automatically become Malaysian citizens, rather than sharing a common nationality, and set the merger referendum for 1 September. An overwhelming majority voted for Option A, which granted Singapore the highest level of autonomy with special status as outlined in the White Paper. (Note: Under Option B, Singapore's status in the Federation would be equivalent to the other states of Malaya. Option C would grant Singapore similar rights to those proposed for Sabah and Sarawak.)

Ahead of the Brunei revolt, Lim Chin Siong of BS met with its leader A. M. Azahari, and the party expressed support for the uprising. The PAP regarded these actions as a Communist-backed threat to Singapore. Using this pretext, Lee, with Malayan and British authorities, launched Operation Coldstore on 2 February 1963, detaining 113 left-wing leaders and crippling the Barisan and Communist networks. The crackdown cleared the way for further merger negotiations, though Lee, Goh, and their team still faced tough discussions with Malayan officials over the financial terms of the merger and the common market. A final agreement was reached in July 1963 following a series of meetings in London mediated by Duncan Sandys, the Secretary for Common Relations. On 16 September 1963, Singapore joined Malaya, along with Sabah and Sarawak, to form Malaysia.

=== Singapore in Malaysia ===
The Malaysia Agreement codified the terms by which Malaya, North Borneo, Sarawak, and Singapore became Malaysia.

Shortly after merger, Singapore held its general elections on 21 September, which were also contested by the Singapore Alliance, the local counterpart of the ruling Alliance Party in Malaya. Although the Tunku and Lee had a gentlemen's agreement not to interfere in each other's politics, the Malaysian leaders, including the Tunku, had come to Singapore to campaign for the Singapore Alliance. Nevertheless, the Singapore Alliance failed to win any seats in the 1963 elections, much to the Tunku's shock. Australian and British officials regarded the PAP's victory as a public endorsement of merger and Lee's socio-economic policies.

Brief tensions followed between the United Malays National Organisation (UMNO) and the PAP, particularly with UMNO's Singapore branch hosting a series of anti-PAP rallies. Ultra-nationalists within UMNO alleged that Lee sought to overthrow the Malay monarchies and infringe on rural life. Nevertheless, on 29 September, Lee affirmed that Singapore fully recognised the Central Government's ultimate authority, but emphasised that Singapore sought cooperative relations with Kuala Lumpur on the basis of equality rather than a master-servant relationship. Lee also pledged not to contest in the 1964 federal elections. Following another meeting with Lee, the Tunku agreed to set aside their differences for Malaysia's nation-building, and called for the people of Singapore to consider themselves part of the Malaysian nation.

The PAP decided to contest in the 1964 Malaysian federal elections in response to the Tunku's plans to reform the Singapore Alliance. This limited form of electoral intervention was viewed by the PAP as a "necessary first gesture" to establish itself as a "Malaysian" party and to encourage the Tunku to include the PAP in his government, thereby giving the party leverage to safeguard Singapore's interests. The Tunku had Lee's trip to the United States postponed, saying that "it would be inconsistent politically for the PAP to represent this Government (Malaysia) abroad". Out of the nine seats contested by the PAP, the PAP only won a single seat with Devan Nair securing the Bangsar constituency in Kuala Lumpur. Relations between the PAP and the Alliance only further worsened.

=== Communal tensions and riots ===
Lee asserted that following the 1964 elections, UMNO activists launched a three-month campaign accusing the PAP of oppressing the Malays in Singapore, which included an UMNO-sponsored convention held on 12 July 1964. Lau believed that this campaign aimed to mobilise the Malay community to intimidate the PAP into submission, weaken Malay support for the party, allow UMNO to regain its electoral stronghold in Singapore's Malay constituencies, and force the PAP to function as a communal party, relying solely on its Chinese support once Malay backing was lost.

Lau and Leifer attributed the subsequent racial riots to UMNO's communal agitation. The PAP leaders maintained that the July riots were orchestrated by UMNO activists rather than arising from genuine racial tensions. Lee claimed in his address following the riots that there were clear signs of prior organisation and planning, designed to escalate the situation into a violent communal clash, with only a trigger required to ignite the riots. The riots severely damaged the PAP government's standing in Singapore, with the PAP ministers alarmed by the poor reception they received among the constituents who felt the PAP could not shield Singapore from federal interference. Chinese residents also alleged that they had to rely on members of Chinese secret societies as they believed federal troops and police displayed a pro-Malay bias. The Malay community, on the other hand, were more keen to accept Tun Razak's address regarding the events.

The PAP urged the federal authorities either to condemn the UMNO extremists responsible for the unrest or to convene an inquiry into the riots, believing that such an investigation would clear the Singapore Government of allegations of mistreating Malays while implicating UMNO leaders for instigating the violence. On 20 September, the Tunku raised issues previously used by advocates of Malay rights in Singapore before the riots, particularly the allegation that Malays were being forced from their homes. He blamed Singapore's leaders for fostering the circumstances that led to the unrest, making it clear that his criticism was aimed at the PAP for contesting in the federal elections, which he said violated the terms under which Malaysia was formed. He added that there was an attempt to challenge his authority by portraying him as merely a leader of the Malays rather than of all Malaysians. Nevertheless, following a meeting between Lee, the other PAP leaders and the Tunku on 26 September, both sides agreed to a two-year political truce, with a pledge not to raise sensitive matters concerning communal positions in Malaysia and to set aside party disputes for two years.

However, on 25 October, Malaysian Minister of Agriculture Khir Johari announced plans to reorganise the Singapore Alliance by unifying the activities of its four component parties and creating a central constitution, with the aim of ousting the PAP government in the 1967 Singapore elections. While Khir claimed ignorance of the truce, the Tunku on 28 October clarified that the "truce" only applied to racial issues and did not cover the reorganisation of the Singapore Alliance. In response, Singapore's deputy prime minister Toh Chin Chye stated that the PAP would be "reoriented and reorganised" towards Malaya, with plans to establish branches throughout the Malayan states.

=== Malaysian Malaysia ===
As the PAP was pushed further into opposition against the Alliance, it began to plan the formation of an alliance of non-communal opposition parties as a "counter-strategy" to the Alliance's efforts to oust the PAP. Lee, Toh, and S. Rajaratnam first met with opposition leaders from Sabah, Sarawak, and Malaya in February 1965. Following the Tunku's acknowledgment of these plans in April 1965, (Note: Lau mentioned that a secret report delivered to the Tunku might have dissuaded him from reaching any agreement with Lee during negotiations on political rearrangements.) the PAP, along with the People's Progressive Party, the United Democratic Party, Sarawak United People Party and Machinda party, announced on 9 May the establishment of the Malaysian Solidarity Convention (MSC) and their campaign for a "Malaysian Malaysia". (Note: This was despite Lee's and Goh's acceptance of Article 153 as part of the 1963 Malaysia Agreement.)

The UMNO leaders viewed the move as, in Albert Lau's words, "a direct challenge to Malay supremacy and special rights". At the UMNO general assembly on 15 and 16 May, several delegates called for Lee's arrest, although the Tunku and Ismail Abdul Rahman urged restraint and reaffirmed that Malaysia was a democratic nation. The Tunku also declared his opposition to Singapore's separation. On 27 May, Lee delivered a speech in the Malaysian Parliament, reiterating his call for a "Malaysian Malaysia" while seeking to amend the Alliance's resolution of gratitude for the King's speech. Most of the speech was delivered by Lee in fluent Malay, without a script. The speech caused a row in the parliament, and Lee's motion was ultimately defeated when Razak delivered a speech against Lee. At the time, Lee said he "would be the last man" to suggest splitting up Malaysia. The Tunku regarded this speech as the "straw that broke the camel's back", which would lead to Singapore's eventual separation from Malaysia.

=== Separation ===
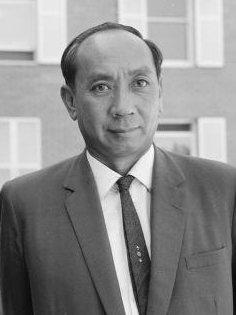
Goh Keng Swee believed that it was ultimately in the best interests of both Singapore and Malaysia to part ways and pursue separate paths.

On 15 July 1965, Goh met with Tun Razak in Kuala Lumpur and suggested separation to resolve the strained relationship between Singapore and Malaysia. Although Lee had contemplated alternatives such as a looser federation or a confederation, Goh never raised either option with Tun Razak, recognising the Malaysian leadership's reluctance to retain Singapore within the Federation. (Note: The Tunku had confided with Singapore's development minister Lim Kim San in June about his growing inclination toward separation, commenting that Lee could attend the next Commonwealth Prime Ministers' Conference in London "on his own". At the time, however, Lim did not grasp the significance of these comments.) Lee only learned of this in 1994, when he read Goh's oral history account of the separation. Subsequently, on 26 July 1965, Lee authorised Goh in a letter to resume discussions for "any constitutional rearrangements of Malaysia". Both sides coordinated discreetly to ensure that when the Tunku publicly announced Singapore's separation, the process would be presented as a fait accompli that could not be obstructed by popular resistance or pro-merger sentiment, which had remained significant at the time.

Lee instructed Singapore's law minister E. W. Barker to begin drafting the legal documents for Singapore's separation from Malaysia. He also enlisted the assistance of his wife, Kwa Geok Choo, to help review the documents and ensure the inclusion of the water agreements signed between Singapore and Johor. Upon reviewing and approving the drafts, Lee authorised Barker to transmit them to Razak. Throughout this period, Tun Razak kept the Tunku apprised of the developments. The Tunku subsequently endorsed the drafts and gave his assent to the separation. At the conclusion of the negotiations, Goh, Lee, Barker, Razak, Ismail and the Tunku all concurred that it would be in the best interests of both parties for Singapore and Malaysia to part on a "clean break" and pursue separate paths.

The discussions between Malaysian and Singaporean leaders, along with the drafting of the separation documents, were carried out under strict secrecy, with Toh Chin Chye and Rajaratnam initially kept uninformed. When Lee summoned them to Kuala Lumpur on 7 August and presented the documents, just two days before the planned separation, both Toh and Rajaratnam were deeply distressed and initially refused to endorse the agreement. It was only after receiving a personal letter from Tunku, emphasising that Singapore's expulsion was final, that the two men signed. Lee also told Toh and Rajaratnam that he would not proceed with separation if both refused to sign, but they would have to assume responsibility if racial clashes continued.

On 9 August 1965 at 9:30 am, Tunku convened the Malaysian parliament and moved the Constitution and Malaysia (Singapore Amendment) Bill 1965, which passed unanimously by a vote of 126–0 without PAP representatives present. The Bill was later approved by the Dewan Negara unanimously under a certificate of urgency. Singapore's independence was announced locally via radio at the same time and Lee broke the news to senior diplomats and civil servants. Initial reactions among Singaporeans to the announcement were mixed; a few were despondent while others let off firecrackers in celebration.

== Politics ==
=== Government ===
External Image
- Yusof taking the oath of office upon his reappointment as Yang di-Pertuan Negara in 1964 as Chief Justice Wee Chong Jin watches. via National Archives of Singapore

The Yang di-Pertuan Negara was Singapore's head of state, appointed by the Yang di-Pertuan Agong. The Yang di-Pertuan Negara of Singapore was Yusof Ishak, who took office in 1959 when Singapore attained internal self-governance under British rule. His term was extended in 1964 under Singapore's revised constitution following merger with Malaysia. Under the 1963 State of Singapore Constitution, the Yang di-Pertuan Negara was empowered to appoint the Prime Minister, withhold consent to a request for the dissolution of the Legislative Assembly, and exercise other functions conferred by the Federal Constitution and the state constitution.

The 51-member Legislative Assembly formed the state's legislature and was elected for a maximum term of five years. The Prime Minister needed to command the confidence of a majority of the Assembly. Lee Kuan Yew was Singapore's Prime Minister during merger. After separation, Malaysian Prime Minister Tunku Abdul Rahman reflected that there should have been only one "executive head", noting that some countries had regarded the Singapore's Prime Minister as an equal partner within the Malaysian government, which created awkwardness in his relationship with Lee. He later claimed that he had allowed Lee to retain the title for two years because he never intended for Singapore to remain within the Federation.

The 1963 State of Singapore Constitution replaced the 1958 State of Singapore Constitution, though most of its provisions remained broadly similar, particularly those governing the legislature, executive, public administration, and the government's special responsibility towards minority communities. Under the merger, however, authority over defence, external affairs, and internal security was transferred to the federal government. Provisions in the 1958 Constitution relating to the office of the British High Commissioner and the Internal Security Council were also removed. The 1963 Constitution came into force on 31 August 1963 and remained in effect until Singapore's independence on 9 August 1965.

=== Federal–State relations ===
External Image
- Map of Malaysia, illustrating the flags and coats of arms of the 14 member states including Singapore. via roots.gov.sg

As part of Malaysia, Singapore was represented by 15 seats in the national Dewan Rakyat. This was far less than would be merited on a strict population bases (at the time, Singapore made up 16.9% of Malaysia's population, which would equate to 27 seats). The Singapore Legislative Assembly also appointed two senators to the Dewan Negara. Singaporeans were not allowed to run for or vote in elections elsewhere in Malaysia. In turn, non-Singaporeans could not run in Singapore. According to Lim, these electoral arrangements were intended to counter the favourable ethnic-political balance posed by Singapore's Chinese-majority population. However, Singapore was also granted additional autonomy compared to other states in the areas of education and labour, and allowed to maintain its own language policies by keeping English, Malay, Mandarin and Tamil as official languages. Singapore would pay 40% of its total revenue to the federal government, alongside a $150 million (US$497 million in 2021) loan to the Borneo territories, of which two-thirds would be interest-free for five years. A common market was also planned to be implemented over twelve years.

Tensions began when Malaysian leaders, including the Tunku, campaigned in Singapore during the 1963 Singaporean elections. After the Singapore Alliance failed to win any seats, brief UMNO–PAP tensions followed before the Tunku agreed to set aside their differences for Malaysia's nation-building. On 31 October 1963, Lee Kuan Yew declared that the PAP would be "loyal opposition" in the Malaysian parliament, a statement rebuffed by the house speaker Dato Haji Noah.

Despite Lee's promise not to contest in the 1964 federal elections, the PAP proceeded to do so at the urging of Toh Chin Chye, S. Rajaratnam, and Ong Pang Boon. (Note: On 19 March 1964, the Attorney-General Abdul Kadir Yusof ruled that Singaporean citizens were allowed to campaign in the Federal and State elections as they were considered Malaysian citizens.) Finance minister Goh Keng Swee opposed the move, for it would strain relations with the Federal Government and undermine plans for a common market. Lee also had doubts, but ultimately accepted the Central Executive Committee's decision in response to the Alliance's interference in the 1963 elections. Singapore's leaders believed limited PAP intervention in Malaysian politics could be framed as cooperation against pro-communist forces while pressuring the Tunku to share power, arguing that UMNO's leadership was vital for Malaysia but the Malaysian Chinese Association (MCA) was replaceable. Malaysian leaders, however, saw this as a breach of prior understandings and were alarmed by the prospect of the PAP challenging the Alliance in Malaya, forcing Kuala Lumpur to choose between accommodating or confronting it. The Tunku also rejected abandoning the MCA. With the PAP's electoral defeat, PAP–Alliance relations only further worsened.

Following the racial riots, which the PAP attributed to UMNO's communal agitation, Lee sought a constitutional rearrangement with Kuala Lumpur, fearing that extremist elements in Malaysia might exploit communal politics and unrest as a means to destabilise Singapore. Discussions were held between Lee, Goh, the Tunku, and his deputy Tun Razak. Razak suggested to Goh that the Federal Government would consider bringing the PAP into the ruling coalition if it ceased campaigning in Malay constituencies and if Lee stepped down – a proposal that was rejected. (Note: British prime minister Alec Douglas-Home had suggested to the Tunku in July 1964 to include the PAP in his coalition government.)

By late October or November 1964, Lee had concluded that continued union with Malaysia was untenable, believing that to prevent further riots and rising tensions, some form of disengagement was necessary to reduce friction. The Tunku in December 1964 had proposed a confederation, under which Singapore would revert to the degree of self-governance it held from 1959 to 1963 while remaining within Malaysia. The Tunku initially told Goh his desire to "hive off" Singapore from Malaysia on 15 December, although he later clarified his proposed constitutional rearrangements on 19 December. Kuala Lumpur would continue to oversee defence and foreign affairs, and internal security would be managed jointly through an Internal Security Council. However, a contentious point was that Singapore's tax revenues would go to the federal treasury despite having no representation in the Malaysian Parliament. The Tunku also sought to remove Singapore from Malaysian politics, but was unwilling to accept the corresponding condition that Malaysia stay out of Singapore's domestic affairs.

Tensions further escalated in November 1964 as the PAP criticised Malaysian finance minister Tan Siew Sin's controversial tax proposals intended to address budget deficient from the Konfrontasi. (Note: The budget deficit was M$543 million (US$1,800 million in 2021)) In response to PAP's criticisms, Tan threatened to increase Singapore's revenue contribution to the Central Government from 40 to 60 per cent. Following additional delays in the release of development loans to Sabah, Tan renewed his threat in July 1965, a move rejected by Goh. The confederation negotiations eventually fell through in February 1965 due to British intervention, who were defending Malaysia against the Konfrontasi. The potential collapse of the Federation would have lent weight to Indonesian propaganda portraying Malaysia as an artificial and short-lived construct unworthy of firm support, while also destabilising Sabah and Sarawak. For these reasons, the British strongly opposed any constitutional changes affecting Singapore's position within Malaysia. Nevertheless, relations between Singapore and Kuala Lumpur failed to improve, as the PAP prepared contingency plans to consolidate its position elsewhere in Malaysia should the political truce between the two governments break down.

=== Administrative divisions ===
Singapore was the smallest state of Malaysia at 581.5 km^{2} (224.5 sq mi), with the next smallest state being Perlis at 819 km^{2} (316 sq mi). The state was divided into 34 mukims and a town area, itself divided into 30 subdivisions.

1. Telok Blanga (Telok Blangah)
2. Tanglin
3. Pasir Panjang
4. Ulu Pandan
5. Pandan
6. Peng Kang
7. Tuas
8. Bajau
9. Choa Chu Kang
10. Jurong
11. Kranji
12. Lim Chu Kang
13. Sembawang
14. Mandai
15. Ulu Kalang
16. Bukit Timah
17. Toa Payoh
18. Ang Mo Kio
19. North Seletar
20. South Seletar
21. Punggol
22. Saranggong (Serangoon)
23. Paya Lebar
24. Kalang (Kallang)
25. Gelang (Geylang)
26. Siglap
27. Bedok
28. Ulu Bedok
29. Tampines
30. Teban
31. Changi
32. Pulau Ubin
33. Pulau Tekong
34. Other Islands (Western and Southern Islands)

=== Security ===
Before merger, Singapore was the headquarters of the British Far East Land Forces and the Far East Station of the Royal Navy. The Royal Air Force in the Far East was subordinated to the Far East Air Forces of Changi Air Base. Singapore also maintained the First Singapore Infantry Regiment (1 SIR), which was placed under the 4th Malaysian Infantry Brigade (4 MIB) and redesignated as the 1st Malaysian Infantry Regiment (1 MIR). With the formation of Malaysia, the Anglo–Malayan Defence Agreement (AMDA) was extended to include Singapore, Sabah and Sarawak. While the Tunku was supportive of retaining the British bases in Singapore for Commonwealth defence in peacetime, he warned that Singapore was too vulnerable to function as a wartime operational base. In 1961, he sought to separate Malaysia's limited defensive needs from SEATO involvement, whereas the British Foreign Office prioritised Britain's obligations to its SEATO allies in discussions over the future of Singapore and other British territories in Southeast Asia. In 1962, the Tunku said that Singapore's base was a British installation over which Britain retained full discretion, with Malaya to be consulted only as a matter of courtesy. He denied it was a SEATO base, but said the Federation would not oppose Singapore's use for SEATO purposes if regional security required it.

During the Indonesian Konfrontasi, Singapore's prime minister Lee Kuan Yew initially downplayed Indonesian demonstrations as routine and maintained normal relations with Indonesia through Singapore's trade and cultural representation. However, as the Confrontation escalated in early 1964 with tighter embargoes and increased violence against Singapore, its leadership moved closer to Kuala Lumpur and publicly condemned Indonesian policy. Lee also endorsed Kuala Lumpur's National Service call-up scheme which extended to Singapore, Sabah and Sarawak. Under this scheme, around 400 Singaporeans were conscripted. Singapore detained and convicted 43 Indonesians for armed offences during Konfrontasi. On 10 March 1965, an Indonesian-planted bomb at MacDonald House killed two people and injured 33, leading to the arrest of marines Usman Haji Muhammad Ali and Harun Thohir on murder charges.

During discussions for proposed constitutional rearrangements between Singapore and Malaysia, Razak proposed that Singapore contribute 17% of federal defence expenditure, reflecting its share of Malaysia's population. However, Singapore would have neither control over the forces it funded nor any say in defence or external affairs. Lee countered that if the PAP were excluded from the Federal Parliament, Singapore would instead raise its own battalions, which would still be placed under the Federal Government's control. Lee concluded that any constitutional rearrangement was pointless without Singapore controlling its own internal security, warning that the Federal Government could subject Singapore to "communal blackmail" especially through the race riots.

== Economy ==
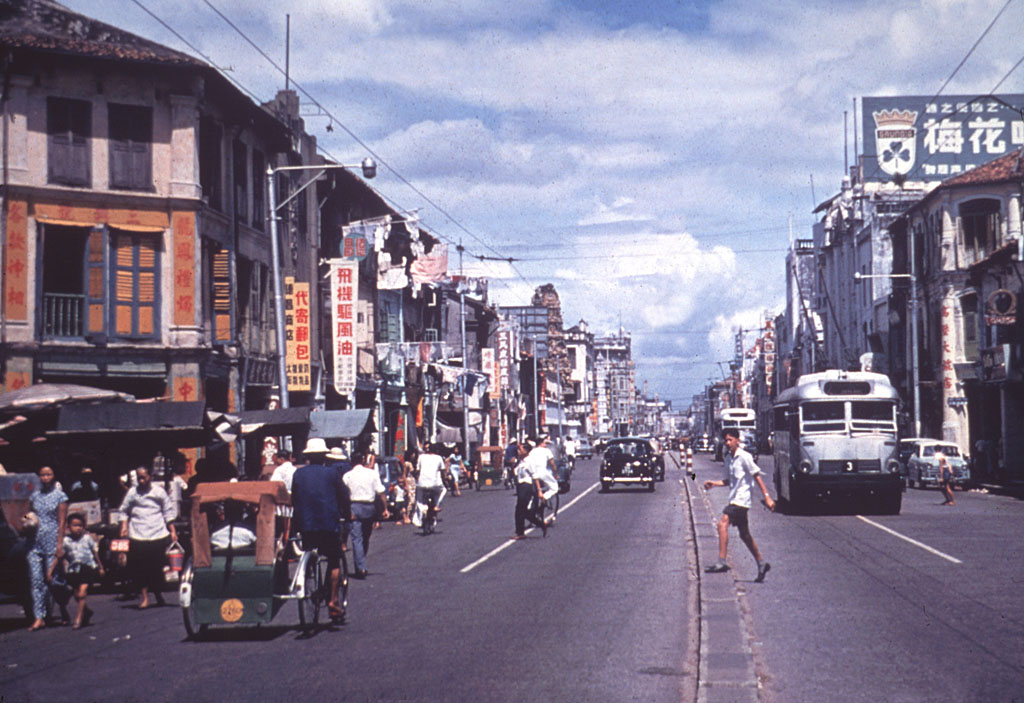
South Bridge Road in February 1965

Singapore's economic affairs were managed by the Economic Development Board (EDB), which was established in 1961. Before the merger, Singapore had the highest per capita income among the prospective Malaysian territories – about M$1,300 (US$4,309 in 2021) against the Federation's M$800 (US$2,651 in 2021). Manufacturing and construction employed 20% of the workforce, while trade, transport, and other services accounted for nearly 70%. Nevertheless, much of Singapore's external earnings were derived from entrepôt trade, with domestic exports and spending by British forces contributing to a smaller share. The PAP viewed a customs union with Malaya as important for Singapore's economic future, given the decline in entrepôt trade, limited natural resources, and rising unemployment with a rapidly growing population. The 1961 Singapore White Paper stated that Singapore would maintain its free port status and greater local autonomy, while the Federal Government would continue to legislate on national taxes. The Tunku had also called Singapore to be the "New York" of Malaysia.

However, early disagreements in the subsequent negotiations stemmed from the division of expenditures, the amount of Singapore's contribution to federal spending, and the responsibility for collecting national taxes in Singapore after the merger. The Malayan government also feared unfair competition with Singapore under a common market, as Singapore's lower labour costs and free port status could draw in Malayan industry, allowing Singapore to develop at the expense of the rest of Malaysia. Eventually, Singapore agreed to contribute 40% of its tax revenue to the Federal government, provide a fifteen-year M$150 million (US$497 million in 2021) loan for Borneo's development, (Note: M$100 million of the loan would be interest-free in the first five years.) and supply 50% of the labour for projects funded by the loan. The common market terms were also set out in Annex J of the Malaysia Agreement, providing for a 12-year gradual implementation as protective and revenue duties were harmonised by Malaysia's Tariff Advisory Board. Certain safeguards exempted goods with principal terminals outside Malaysia, allowing the Federation to tax items like tin and rubber before they reached Singapore for export. Article 1(3) further limited Singapore's advantage in manufacturing imported materials by permitting special taxes to offset cost differences from differential import duties, with unrestricted trade only where protective duties were uniform.

A 1963 economic report observed that Singapore's economy experienced an "unprecedented upsurge" in industrial development following the merger, despite the Konfrontasi with Indonesia. This economic growth was attributed to increased private investment in manufacturing and construction, trade diversification to offset losses from suspended Indonesian trade, and strong public investment in infrastructure and social development. Gross imports rose to $4.279 million (US$14 million in 2021) in 1963, a 6% increase from the previous year, while exports reached $3.475 million (US$11 million in 2021), up by 1%. The formation of Malaysia had also brought political and economic stability, along with the prospect of an expanded market through the Common Market. This encouraged the development of heavy and consumer industries, including soda-chlorine, plastics, sheet glass, copper smelting, automobile components, and precision engineering. In 1964, Singapore's Gross Domestic Product increased from $2.744.6 million to $2.782 million, (Note: (US$8.96 million to US$8.96 million in 2021)) although a slight decline in per capita from $1,546 to $1,529 was observed due to population increase. Overall trade decreased from $7.7535 million in 1963 to $6.2498 million (Note: (US$25 million to US$20 million in 2021)) in 1964, despite increased trade with Sarawak, Sabah and Hong Kong. This was attributed to suspension of trade with Indonesia.

Following PAP's criticisms of Tan Siew Sin's controversial tax proposals, Tan threatened to increase Singapore's revenue contribution to 60% in 1964. This threat was renewed in July 1965 following delays in the release of development loans to Sabah. Lee had planned to bring the matter before the World Bank for arbitration. Further economic disagreements between Singapore and Malaysia arose from the federal government's reluctance to approve pioneer industry permits for Singapore, with only two of 69 EDB applications accepted. Malaysia also sought control of Singapore's textile quota to develop a garment industry in Malaysia. Although this proposal was not carried out, Singapore's Goh Keng Swee regarded the move as evidence of the federal government's lack of commitment to building a common market that would support Singapore's import-substitution strategy.

== Demographics ==
Before merger, Singapore's population was predominantly Chinese, who comprised 75.2% of the population, while Malays accounted for about 14%. As of December 1961, Singapore's population stood at approximately 1.7 million. By June 1963, Singapore had a population of about 1.775 million, comprising 1,334,500 Chinese, 249,200 Malays, 146,100 Indians, and 45,400 others. This total exceeded that of any single Malayan state, with the most populous Malayan state, Perak, having a population of about 1.47 million. Singapore's population rose to 1.82 million in June 1964, with 944,900 males and 875,100 females.

== Legacy ==
=== Separation narrative ===
Lee announcing Singapore's separation from the federation on 9 August 1965, often seen as Lee's "moment of anguish" over the nation's uncertain future. However, from Lee's memoirs, he explained that his distress stemmed from feeling he had let down many supporters in Malaya, Sabah, and Sarawak who had embraced his vision of a "Malaysian Malaysia".

For many years following separation, it was taught, especially among Singaporeans, that their nation was unwillingly expelled from Malaysia. This account portrayed Singapore's independence as "sudden" and "unplanned." When Singapore's separation was announced in August 1965, The Straits Times ran an article featuring Tunku Abdul Rahman with the subheader "Tengku: It was my idea...", which may have led many readers to believe that the separation was initiated solely by the Tunku. In an interview with The Straits Times on 15 August following separation, the Tunku presented a chronology that credited Malaysian Attorney-General Abdul Kadir Yusof, rather than Singapore's E. W. Barker, with drafting the Separation Agreement, and indicated that Singapore's leaders were informed only after he had decided to expel Singapore. Singaporean historian Albert Lau added that limited public information about the separation negotiations, combined with the sudden announcement of independence, fostered the perception that Singapore had been expelled, even though official Singaporean accounts had always generally used the more neutral term "separation" rather than "ejection". American historian Thomas John Bellows first challenged the expulsion theory in his 1970 book The People's Action Party of Singapore: Emergence of a Dominant Party System, claiming that the separation was the deliberate result of the PAP's actions in their "Malaysian Malaysia" campaign. However, Malaysian historian Mohammad Noordin Sopiee disagreed with Bellows' argument, believing the PAP's acceptance of separation was to prevent a split of the party and its leaders.

Scholarly research drawing upon cabinet papers, correspondence, memoirs, and oral histories has revealed a more nuanced process in the separation. Lau's book, A Moment of Anguish: Singapore in Malaysia and the Politics of Disengagement, drew upon declassified cables by British and Australian diplomats to provide a fuller account of the Separation. Also central to this reassessment is the Albatross file, compiled by Goh Keng Swee, which shows that Singapore's leaders increasingly viewed the merger as untenable due to deep political and economic differences. These sources indicate that separation was not imposed on Singapore but was instead a deliberate and negotiated decision shaped by necessity and strategic calculation.

On 28 February 2023, Minister of State for Communications and Information Janil Puthucheary announced the government's decision to fully declassify and release the Albatross file. In December 2025, a permanent exhibition – The Albatross File: Singapore’s Independence Declassified – was launched at the National Library, together with its companion volume The Albatross File: Inside Separation, edited by Susan Sim. The exhibition presents original Cabinet papers, handwritten notes, and oral-history interviews with Singapore's founding leaders. At the exhibition launch, Senior Minister Lee Hsien Loong explained that his approval to declassify and publish the file, together with key oral history extracts, was to provide a full and documented account of Singapore's separation from Malaysia, capturing both the events and the emotions of the founding leaders. In his speech, he identified two lasting lessons from Singapore's time in Malaysia: the importance of public trust in political leadership, and the need to safeguard racial and religious harmony.

=== Currency ===
Singapore and Malaya shared a common currency issued by the Straits Settlements Currency Commissioners from 1899. After Malaya's independence in 1957, the Bank Negara Malaya (BNM) was established and began operations in 1959, with provisions to extend its functions to Singapore and Borneo in anticipation of merger. In Singapore, Lee Kuan Yew and Tan Siew Sin indicated support for a common Malaysian currency, provided Singapore's interests were protected through continued joint management of the currency system. However, the BNM initially had limited powers, and issuance of the Malaya and British Borneo dollar remained with the Commissioner of Currency, resulting in the central bank operating alongside the existing currency board system. The currency union ended in June 1967 and Malaysia, Singapore and Brunei issued their own currencies, which remained interchangeable at par value under the Interchangeability Agreement.

In May 1973, Malaysia announced its decision to exit the agreement because it was seen as hindering the development of Malaysian financial institutions while disproportionately benefiting Singapore as the more established financial and trading centre. The Malaysian government also viewed interchangeability as a temporary post-merger arrangement that could not be sustained once Malaysia and Singapore began pursuing different economic and monetary policies. The banks continued exchanging the two currencies at par until 7 August 1973. Brunei and Singapore have continued to maintain their currencies at par.

=== Airline ===
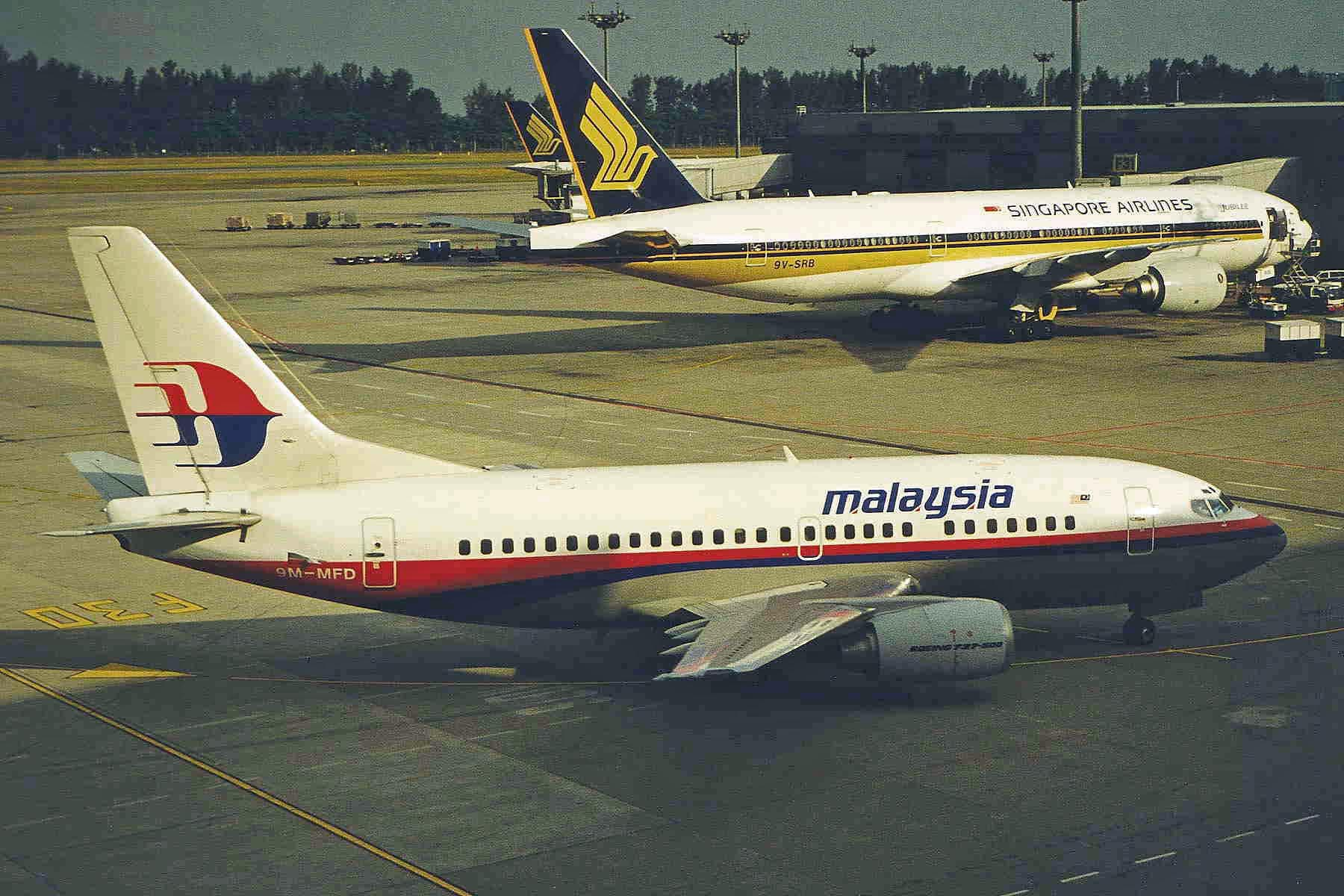
Planes from Malaysia Airlines and Singapore Airlines

After separation, Singapore and Malaysia initially shared a common national carrier Malaysian Airways, which was renamed to Malaysia–Singapore Airlines (MSA) in December 1966. However, in January 1971, the Singaporean and Malaysian governments announced their decision to split the MSA, with Malaysia seeking to expand the airline's domestic network and Singapore focusing on developing its international routes. At that time, the two governments held 43% of the shares each, with British Overseas Airways Corporation and Qantas holding 4.1% each.

On 28 January 1972, Singapore announced that its national carrier would be named Mercury Singapore Airlines and would take over the MSA's Boeing fleet. Malaysia, displeased that the MSA initialism was retained, threatened legal action unless Singapore agreed to pay S$72.7 million (US$241 million in 2021) in compensation. Eventually, Singapore decided to name its national carrier Singapore Airlines (SIA), which commenced operations on 1 October 1973.

=== Foreign relations ===
Through the Separation Agreement and the Constitutional Amendment, Malaysia became the first country to officially recognise Singapore as an independent state. Malaysia also pledged to support Singapore's entry into the British Commonwealth and the United Nations. The United Kingdom subsequently extended recognition the following day. On 20 September 1965, Singapore's UN membership application was introduced at the Security Council by Malaysia and was co-sponsored by the Ivory Coast, Jordan, and the United Kingdom. Through the UN General Assembly Resolution 2010 (XX), Singapore became the UN's 117th member on 21 September. Singapore joined the Commonwealth as its 22nd member on 15 October.

When Indonesia announced it would recognise Singapore in April 1966, the Tunku warned that the move "raises very important issues on the defence of Malaysia as Soekarno has reiterated his determination to crush Malaysia". Lee's statement that Singapore sought to be a friend to all, including Indonesia, prompted the Tunku's reply to Singapore that it had to choose friendship with Malaysia or Indonesia, and objected the establishment of diplomatic ties between Singapore and Indonesia. On 19 April, Malaysian Home Affairs Minister Ismail Abdul Rahman announced the introduction of entry controls for Singaporeans crossing the Johor–Singapore Causeway as a precautionary measure. Lee cabled the Tunku to clarify that Singapore did not intend to harm Malaysia's interests, emphasizing that recognition was Indonesia's choice and that, regardless, Singapore would never act against Malaysia. Relations between Indonesia and Malaysia were normalised in August 1966, followed by the formal establishment of diplomatic ties between Singapore and Indonesia in September. On 8 August 1967, Singapore became one of the founding members of ASEAN along with Thailand, Malaysia, the Philippines and Indonesia. On 1 November 1971, Singapore and Malaysia joined the Five Power Defence Arrangements with Australia, New Zealand, and the United Kingdom following the expiry of the AMDA and the withdrawal of British forces from the region.

== See also ==
- History of Malaysia
- Proclamation of Malaysia
- PAP–UMNO relations
- History of the Republic of Singapore
- Constitution and Malaysia (Singapore Amendment) Act 1965
- Independence of Singapore Agreement 1965
- Proclamation of Singapore
