= Albatross file =

Documents on Singapore's separation from Malaysia

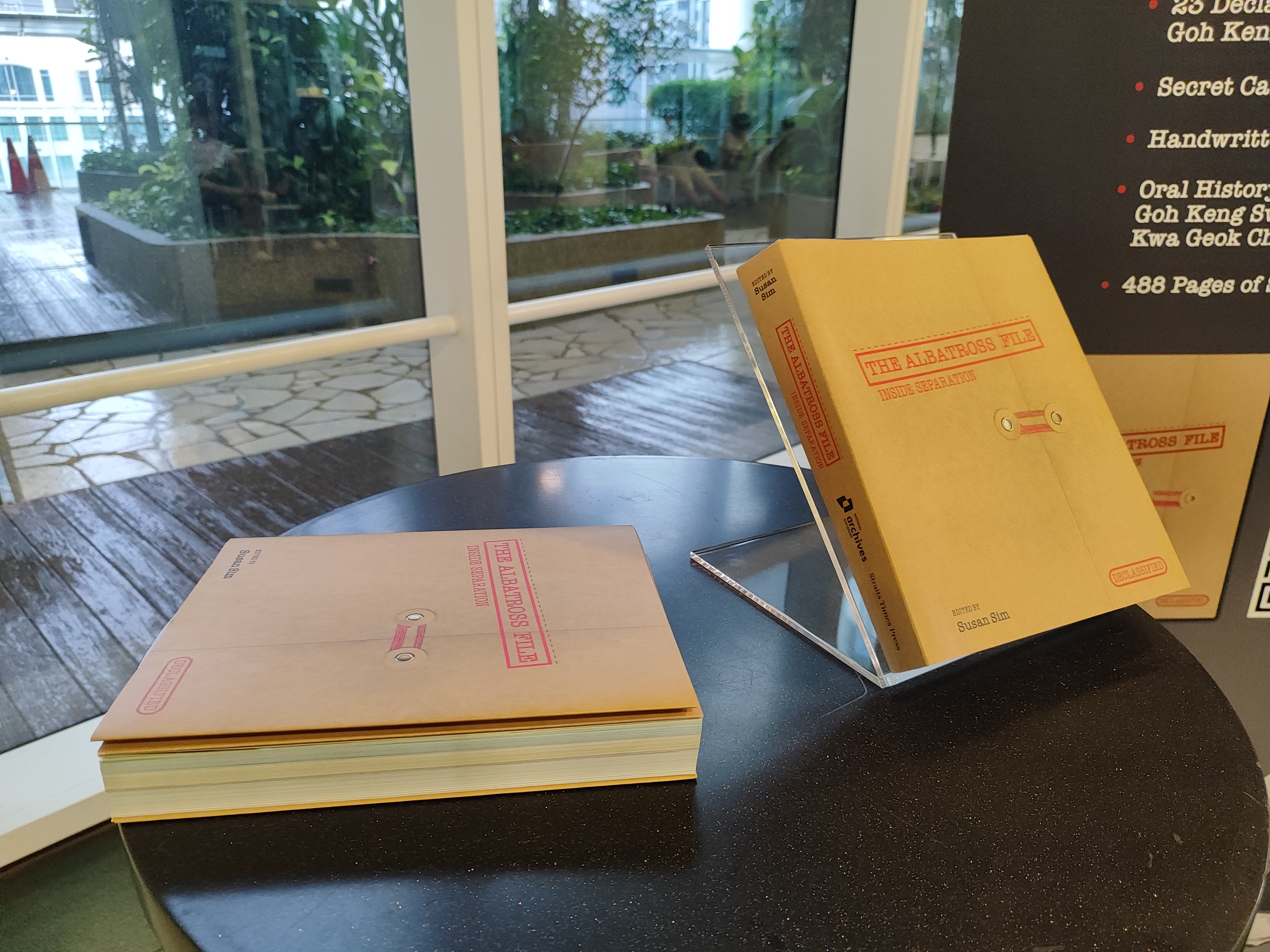
Copies of The Albatross File: Inside Separation edited by Susan Sim, which covers the contents of the Albatross file

The Albatross file is a series of documents covering the period leading up to Singapore's separation from Malaysia in 1965. Compiled by Singapore's finance minister Goh Keng Swee, the file includes papers by the Cabinet of Singapore, confidential memoranda and Goh's handwritten records of his discussions with Malaysian leaders. Although the prevailing narrative holds that Singapore was abruptly and unilaterally expelled from Malaysia by the federal government, the file's documents reveal that as early as 1964 and especially after the racial riots that July, confidential talks regarding Singapore's constitutional rearrangements in Malaysia had commenced between Singapore's People's Action Party and Malaysia's Alliance Party, which eventually led to Singapore's separation.

In a handwritten note, Singaporean prime minister Lee Kuan Yew formally authorised Goh to engage in discussions with Malaysian leaders, Deputy Prime Minister Abdul Razak Hussein and Minister of Home Affairs Ismail Abdul Rahman in early 1965, laying the groundwork for an eventual and orderly separation. Over the course of the year, both sides coordinated discreetly to ensure that when Malaysian prime minister Tunku Abdul Rahman publicly announced Singapore's separation, the process would be presented as a fait accompli that could not be obstructed by popular resistance or pro-merger sentiment, which had remained significant at the time.

Goh compiled the file in mid-1964. While the original file was initially thought lost in 1979, it was recovered in 1982. Goh referred to it in a 1996 interview with military historian Melanie Chew when the merger with Malaysia was discussed, and some material from the file was subsequently cited in Goh's 2007 biography. A few of its documents were showcased at the National Museum of Singapore in September 2015. In 2023, the Government of Singapore announced that the papers would be declassified and released to the public, with a permanent exhibition launched at the National Library in December 2025.

== Background ==
=== Political confrontation between Singapore and Malaysia ===
Shortly after merger with Malaysia on 16 September 1963, Singapore held its general elections on 21 September, which were also contested by the Singapore Alliance, the local counterpart of the ruling Alliance Party in Malaya. Although Tunku Abdul Rahman and Lee Kuan Yew, the prime ministers of Malaysia and Singapore respectively, had a "tacit agreement" not to interfere in each other's politics, the Malaysian leaders, including Tunku, had come to Singapore to campaign for the Singapore Alliance. Nevertheless, the Singapore Alliance failed to win any seats, much to Tunku's shock.

Brief tensions followed between the United Malays National Organisation (UMNO) and the People's Action Party's (PAP), particularly with Singapore UMNO hosting a series of anti-PAP rallies. During an UMNO rally on 28 September, Tunku urged the Malays in Singapore to remain united and defend the country against external threats. Referring to UMNO's defeat, he told the Malays not to be discouraged but to seize "bigger opportunities to save Malaysia". On the next day, Lee affirmed that Singapore fully recognised the Central Government's ultimate authority, but emphasised that Singapore sought cooperative relations with Kuala Lumpur on the basis of equality rather than a master-servant relationship. Lee also pledged not to contest in the 1964 federal elections. On 30 September, in Tunku's pledge to "work closely" with the Singapore Government, he also emphasised that Malaysia's communal politics differed from Singapore's. Following another meeting with Lee, Tunku agreed to set aside their differences for Malaysia's nation-building, and called for the people of Singapore to consider themselves part of the Malaysian nation.

In response to Tunku's resolve to reform the Singapore Alliance, the PAP decided to contest in the 1964 Malaysian federal elections. This limited form of electoral intervention was viewed by the PAP as a "necessary first gesture" to establish itself as a "Malaysian" party and to encourage Tunku to include the PAP in his government, therefor giving the party leverage to safeguard Singapore's interests. However, out of nine seats contested, only Devan Nair of the PAP secured the Bangsar constituency in Kuala Lumpur. Albert Lau considered that the PAP lost whatever leverage it might have had in its electoral defeat, and relations between the PAP and the Alliance only further worsened. On 25 May, Malaysian finance minister Tan Siew Sin, who was also the president of the Malayan Chinese Association (MCA), warned that PAP would be a main threat to the Alliance and expected a "big fight" in the 1969 elections.

=== Communal tensions and riots in Singapore ===
Lee asserted that following the 1964 elections, UMNO activists launched a three-month campaign accusing the PAP of oppressing the Malays in Singapore. On 12 July 1964, a 23-man "action delegation" was appointed to engage with the Singapore Government during an UMNO-sponsored convention of 150 Malay organisations. The event was organised in response to a planned Singapore Government convention on issues affecting the Malay community. UMNO secretary-general Dato Syed Jaafar Albar insisted that UMNO was not a "racial party", citing its cooperation with the MCA and the Malaysian Indian Congress (MIC). He also argued that the Central Government had been "too soft" on Lee, accused him of being a "champion of the Chinese", and urged him to consult this new delegation as the “true representatives” of the Malay community instead of the organisations he had invited. Lau believed that this campaign aimed to mobilise the Malay community to intimidate the PAP into submission, weaken Malay support for the party, allow UMNO to regain its electoral stronghold in Singapore's Malay constituencies, and force the PAP to function as a communal party, relying solely on its Chinese support once Malay backing was lost.

Lau and Leifer attributed the subsequent racial riots to UMNO's communal agitation. The PAP leaders maintained that the July riots were orchestrated by UMNO activists rather than arising from genuine racial tensions. Lee claimed in his address following the riots that there were clear signs of prior organisation and planning, designed to escalate the situation into a violent communal clash, with only a trigger required to ignite the riots. The riots severely damaged the PAP government's standing in Singapore, with the PAP ministers alarmed by the poor reception they received among the constituents who felt the PAP could not shield Singapore from federal interference. Chinese residents also alleged that they had to rely on members of Chinese secret societies as they believed federal troops and police displayed a pro-Malay bias. The Malay community, on the other hand, were more keen to accept Tun Razak's address regarding the events.

The PAP urged the federal authorities either to condemn the UMNO extremists responsible for the unrest or to convene an inquiry into the riots, believing that such an investigation would clear the Singapore Government of allegations of mistreating Malays while implicating UMNO leaders for instigating the violence. On 20 September, the Tunku raised issues previously used by advocates of Malay rights in Singapore before the riots, particularly the allegation that Malays were being forced from their homes. He blamed Singapore's leaders for fostering the circumstances that led to the unrest, making it clear that his criticism was aimed at the PAP for contesting in the federal elections, which he said violated the terms under which Malaysia was formed. He added that there was an attempt to challenge his authority by portraying him as merely a leader of the Malays rather than of all Malaysians. Nevertheless, following a meeting between Lee, the other PAP leaders and the Tunku on 26 September, both sides agreed to a two-year political truce, with a pledge not to raise sensitive matters concerning communal positions in Malaysia and to set aside party disputes for two years.

=== Proposals for constitutional rearrangements ===
Following the racial riots, Lee sought a constitutional rearrangement with Kuala Lumpur, fearing that extremist elements in Malaysia might exploit communal politics and unrest as a means to destabilise Singapore. Discussions were held between Lee, Goh, the Tunku, and his deputy Tun Razak. Razak suggested to Goh that the Federal Government would consider bringing the PAP into the ruling coalition if it ceased campaigning in Malay constituencies and if Lee stepped down – a proposal that was rejected.

By late October or November 1964, Lee had concluded that continued union with Malaysia was untenable. In his oral history, he explained that to prevent further riots, rising tensions, and mutual provocation between leaders and extremists on both sides, some form of disengagement was necessary to reduce friction and calm tempers. The Tunku in December 1964 had proposed a confederation, under which Singapore would revert to the degree of self-governance it held from 1959 to 1963 while remaining within Malaysia. The Tunku initially told Goh his desire to "hive off" Singapore from Malaysia on 15 December, although he later clarified his proposed constitutional rearrangements on 19 December. Kuala Lumpur would continue to oversee defence and foreign affairs, and internal security would be managed jointly through an Internal Security Council. However, a contentious point was that Singapore's tax revenues would go to the federal treasury despite having no representation in the Malaysian Parliament. The Tunku also sought to remove Singapore from Malaysian politics, but was unwilling to accept the corresponding condition that Malaysia stay out of Singapore's domestic affairs.

These negotiations eventually fell through in February 1965 due to British intervention, who were defending Malaysia against the Indonesian Konfrontasi. The potential collapse of the Federation would have lent weight to Indonesian propaganda portraying Malaysia as an artificial and short-lived construct unworthy of firm support, while also destabilising Sabah and Sarawak. For these reasons, the British strongly opposed any constitutional changes affecting Singapore's position within Malaysia. Nevertheless, relations between Singapore and Kuala Lumpur failed to improve, as the PAP prepared contingency plans to consolidate its position elsewhere in Malaysia should the political truce between the two governments break down.

=== Malaysian Malaysia ===
Despite the political truce declared in September 1964, Malaysian Minister of Agriculture Khir Johari announced plans on 25 October to reorganise the Singapore Alliance by unifying the activities of its four component parties and creating a central constitution, with the aim of ousting the PAP government in the 1967 Singapore elections. While Khir claimed ignorance of the truce, the Tunku on 28 October clarified that the "truce" only applied to racial issues and did not cover the reorganisation of the Singapore Alliance. In response, deputy prime minister Toh Chin Chye stated that the PAP would be "reoriented and reorganised" towards Malaya, with plans to establish branches throughout the Malayan states.

Further tensions between the federal government and Singapore arose as the PAP criticised Malaysian finance minister Tan Siew Sin's controversial tax proposals in November 1964 that was intended to address the Konfrontasi. In response to PAP's criticisms, Tan threatened to increase Singapore's revenue contribution to the Central Government from 40 to 60 per cent. Following additional delays in the release of development loans to Sabah, Tan renewed his threat to raise the tax in July 1965, a move rejected by Singapore's finance minister Goh Keng Swee. Lee planned to bring the matter before the World Bank for arbitration.

As the PAP was pushed further into opposition against the Alliance, it began to plan the formation of an alliance of non-communal opposition parties as a "counter-strategy" to the Alliance's efforts to oust the PAP. The planned opposition alliance was also aimed at bringing political pressure on the federal government to negotiate better terms for Singapore within Malaysia. Lee, Toh, and Rajaratnam first met with opposition leaders from Sabah, Sarawak, and Malaya in February 1965. Following the Tunku's acknowledgment of these plans in April 1965, the PAP, along with the People's Progressive Party, the United Democratic Party, Sarawak United People Party and Machinda party, announced on 9 May the establishment of the Malaysian Solidarity Convention (MSC) and their campaign for a "Malaysian Malaysia". (Note: This was despite Lee's and Goh's acceptance of Article 153 as part of the 1963 Malaysia Agreement.)

The UMNO leaders viewed the move as, in Albert Lau's words, "a direct challenge to Malay supremacy and special rights". At the UMNO general assembly on 15 and 16 May, several delegates called for Lee's arrest, although the Tunku and Ismail Abdul Rahman urged restraint and reaffirmed that Malaysia was a democratic nation. On 27 May, Lee delivered a speech in the Malaysian Parliament, reiterating his call for a "Malaysian Malaysia" while seeking to amend the Alliance’s resolution of gratitude for the King's speech. The speech caused a row in the parliament, and Lee's motion was ultimately defeated when Razak delivered a speech against Lee. At the time, Lee said he "would be the last man" to suggest splitting up Malaysia. The Tunku regarded this speech as the "straw that broke the camel's back", which would lead to Singapore's eventual separation from Malaysia.

=== Separation talks ===
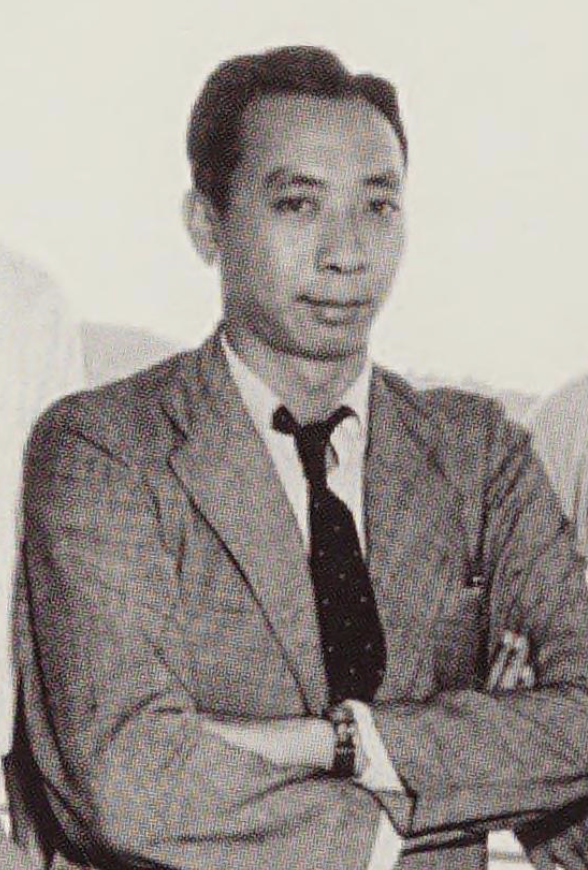
Goh Keng Swee believed that it was ultimately in the best interests of both Singapore and Malaysia to part ways and pursue separate paths.

On 15 July 1965, Goh met with Tun Razak in Kuala Lumpur and suggested separation to resolve the strained relationship between Singapore and Malaysia. Although Lee had contemplated alternatives such as a looser federation or a confederation, Goh never raised either option with Tun Razak, recognising the Malaysian leadership's reluctance to retain Singapore within the Federation. The Tunku had confided with Singapore's development minister Lim Kim San in June about his growing inclination toward separation. Lee only learned of this in 1994, when he read Goh’s oral history account of the separation. Subsequently, on 26 July 1965, Lee authorised Goh in a letter to resume discussions for "any constitutional rearrangements of Malaysia". Both sides coordinated discreetly to ensure that when the Tunku publicly announced Singapore's separation, the process would be presented as a fait accompli that could not be obstructed by popular resistance or pro-merger sentiment, which had remained significant at the time.

Lee instructed Singapore's law minister E. W. Barker to begin drafting the legal documents for Singapore's separation from Malaysia. He also enlisted the assistance of his wife, Kwa Geok Choo, to support this process. Upon reviewing and approving the drafts, Lee authorised Barker to transmit them to Razak, who was conducting negotiations with Goh. Throughout this period, Abdul Razak kept the Tunku apprised of the developments. The Tunku subsequently endorsed the drafts and gave his assent to the separation. The discussions between Malaysian and Singaporean leaders, along with the drafting of the separation documents, were carried out under strict secrecy, with Toh Chin Chye and Rajaratnam initially kept uninformed. When Lee summoned them to Kuala Lumpur on 7 August and presented the documents, just two days before the planned separation, both Toh and Rajaratnam were deeply distressed and initially refused to endorse the agreement. It was only after receiving a personal letter from Tunku, emphasising that Singapore's expulsion was final and that "there was absolutely no other way", that the two men signed. At the conclusion of the negotiations, Goh, Lee, Barker, Abdul Razak, Ismail and the Tunku all concurred that it would be in the best interests of both parties for Singapore and Malaysia to part on a "clean break" and pursue separate paths.

== Composition and release ==
Now I am going to let you into what has been a state secret up to now. This is a file, which I call Albatross.

— Goh Keng Swee during his interview with Melanie Chew

Goh began compiling the file sometime in mid-1964. It was codenamed "Albatross" because Goh believed that Malaysia had become an "Albatross round our necks". By 1979, however, Goh considered his original Albatross file to be lost. He began compiling a thinner dossier codenamed "Albatross II", which he described as containing "miscellaneous papers of no particular importance".

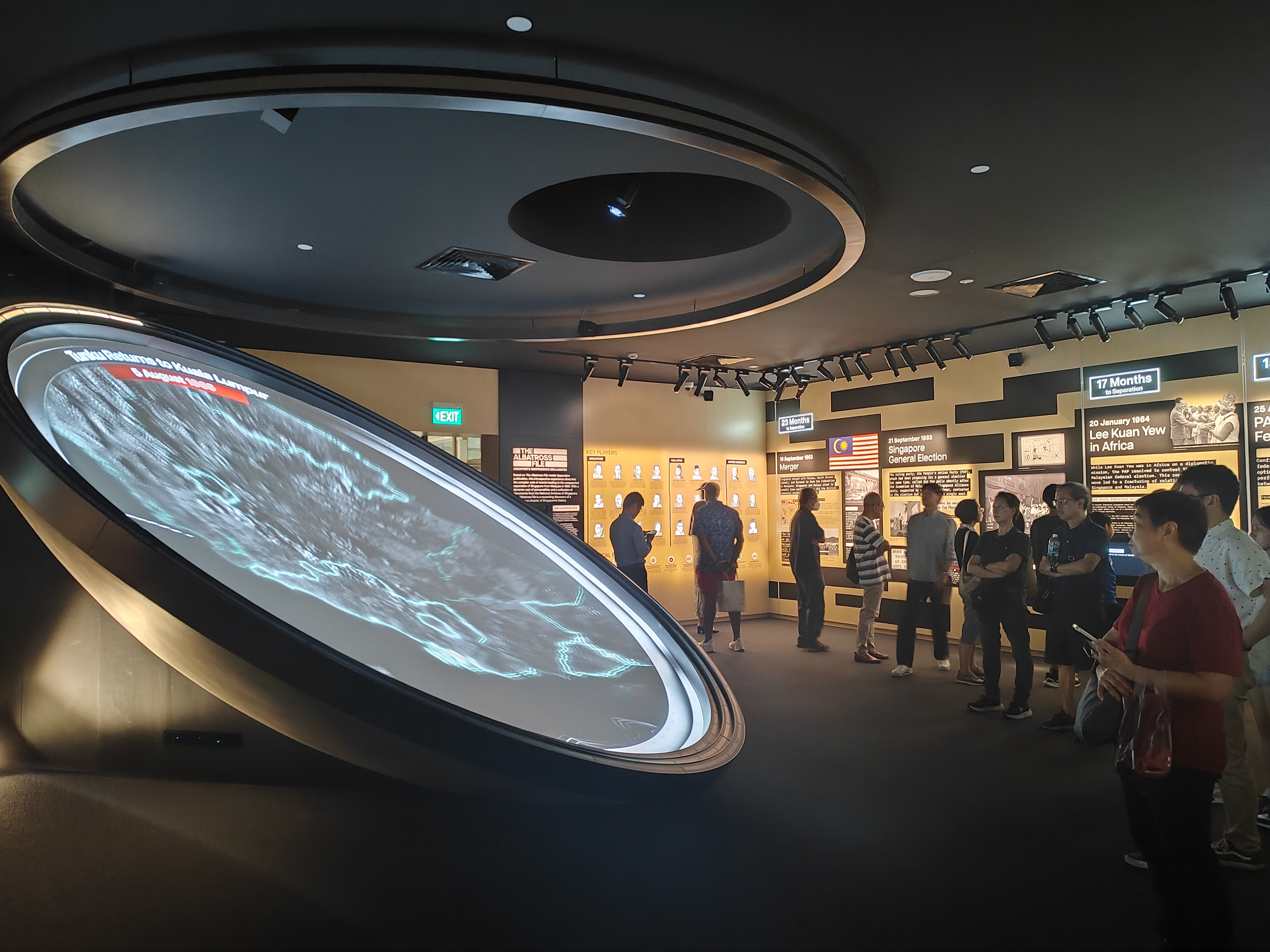
The exhibition launched at the National Library

The original Albatross file was rediscovered in 1982 by researcher Tan Kay Chee in a Ministry of Defence storeroom. The same year, Goh referred to the file in an oral history interview with Tan, before reading out the notes that he had written in the file. In January 1995, Goh received a duplicated Albatross file from Lee Kuan Yew for further "discussion"; Goh referred to it during a 1996 interview with military historian Melanie Chew for her 1996 book Leaders of Singapore. Material from the file was cited in Goh's biography, which was written by his daughter-in-law, Tan Siok Sun, and published in 2007.

Since 1996, the Albatross file has been held by the National Archives of Singapore. A few of its documents were exhibited at the National Museum of Singapore in September 2015. On 28 February 2023, Minister of State for Communications and Information Janil Puthucheary announced the government's decision to fully declassify and release the Albatross file. In December 2025, a permanent exhibition – The Albatross File: Singapore’s Independence Declassified – was launched at the National Library, together with its companion volume The Albatross File: Inside Separation, edited by Susan Sim. The exhibition presents original Cabinet papers, handwritten notes, and oral-history interviews with Singapore's founding leaders.

== Contents ==
=== List of documents ===
Documents in the Albatross file
Author	Date	Subject
Lee Kuan Yew	Undated, likely mid-July 1964	Memorandum for circulation to ministers titled "A Definition of the Post-Malaysia Situation"
Goh Keng Swee	Undated, likely 29 July 1964	"Notes on Meetings with Tun Razak and others in Kuala Lumpur on 28th and 29th July 1964"
Lee Kuan Yew	Undated, c. 25 January 1965	Memorandum titled "Possible constitutional re-arrangements"
Lee Kuan Yew	25 January 1965	Paper titled "Constitutional re-arrangements in Malaysia"
Lee Kuan Yew	27 January 1965	Draft memorandum for circulation to the Cabinet titled "Draft Memorandum for Tunku: Constitutional re-arrangements in Malaysia"
S. Rajaratnam	Undated, likely 27 January 1965	"Comments from the Minister for Culture on PM's Memorandum"
Lee Kuan Yew	6 February 1965	"Notes on Meeting with Tunku and Dr Ismail on 31 January 1965 at the Residency, from 8.25 to 11.45 pm"
Lee Kuan Yew	6 February 1965	"Meeting with Dato Ismail on 1 February 1965 at his office, 12pm to 12.25 pm"
Toh Chin Chye	10 February 1965	"Notes of a Meeting with Tun Razak on 9 February 1965"
Lee Kuan Yew	11 February 1965	Note on the possibility of Umno continuing in Singapore after constitutional rearrangements
Lee Kuan Yew	15 February 1965	"Report of meeting between Lee Kuan Yew, Toh Chin Chye, Lim Kim San and Tunku on 15 February 1965, between 10.10 am to 10.45 am"
Lee Kuan Yew	15 February 1965	Letter to Harold Wilson
Lee Kuan Yew	22 February 1965	"Report of meeting with Dato Fenner, Inspector General of Police, on 19 February 1965, 11.00 am to 12.10 pm"
Lee Kuan Yew	25 February 1965	"Meeting with Dato Ismail at his Ministry on 23 February 1965, 12.00 pm to 12.35 pm"
Lee Kuan Yew	25 February 1965	"Meeting with Lord Head at Carcosa on 23 February 1965, from 12.50 pm to 3.15 pm"
Lee Kuan Yew	25 February 1965	Note on Lee's meetings with Tunku Abdul Rahman on 23 February 1965 and with Claude Fenner and Bill Pritchett on 24 February 1965
Lee Kuan Yew	25 February 1965	Note on Lee's meeting with Lord Head at Temasek House in Kuala Lumpur on 24 February 1965
Lee Kuan Yew	5 March 1965	Note on Lee's meetings with Lord Head, Tom Critchley, Robert Wade, and MK Kidwai in Kuala Lumpur from 1 to 3 March 1965
Goh Keng Swee	9 March 1965	Memorandum on constitutional rearrangements
Goh Keng Swee	Undated, likely 21 July 1965	Handwritten note on Goh's meeting with Abdul Razak Hussein and Ismail Abdul Rahman on 20 July 1965
Lee Kuan Yew	26 July 1965	Handwritten letter authorising Goh Keng Swee to negotiate with Abdul Razak Hussein
Goh Keng Swee	Undated, likely 27 July 1965	Handwritten note on Goh's meeting with Abdul Razak Hussein on 26 July 1965
Goh Keng Swee	Undated, likely 3 August 1965	Handwritten note on Goh's meeting with Abdul Razak Hussein and Ismail Abdul Rahman on 3 August 1965

=== "A Definition of the Post-Malaysia Situation" ===
The memorandum by Lee Kuan Yew to his ministers was, according to Sim, likely written in mid-July 1964, as it excluded any mention of the race riots of 21 July but followed the release of political detainee Soon Loh Boon on 7 July. The "Post-Malaysian situation" referred to the state of relations between the Federal and Singapore governments, with Lee highlighting the "twin evils" of UMNO's racial politics and the Communist threat in Malaysia. In the document, he urged the resolution of immediate issues such as industrialisation and housing, while downplaying the differences between Singapore and the Federal government. The document also mentioned Lee's suggestions for the PAP to extend its outreach to Malaya, Sabah and Sarawak.

=== "Notes on Meetings with Tun Razak and others in Kuala Lumpur on 28th and 29th July, 1964" ===
Following the race riots in July 1964, Goh Keng Swee arranged a meeting with Tun Razak, his former schoolmate at Raffles College. In Kuala Lumpur, Razak, together with Khir Johari, V.T. Sambanthan, and Jaffar Albar, expressed that they viewed Lee as a threat to UMNO supremacy and even suggested that Lee step down as Singapore's Prime Minister, with Goh assuming leadership. Although Razak changed his mind the following day, he insisted that for Singapore to remain in Malaysia, it must accept that "UMNO must have the monopoly of leadership in the Malay world", free from competition by non-Malay parties. When Goh later discussed the proposals with Antony Head, the British High Commissioner to Malaysia, Head deemed them "unworkable" and warned that Lee's resignation would "inflame Chinese feelings".

=== "Possible constitutional re-arrangements" ===
Written around 25 January 1965 for discussion with Singapore's Cabinet, Lee outlined two options: for the PAP to remain in the Malaysian Parliament but refrain from political activity outside Singapore, or for Singapore to have full autonomy while contributing to Malaysia's collective defence. This memorandum was prepared amid ongoing negotiations over constitutional rearrangements concerning Singapore's position within Malaysia.

=== "Constitutional re-arrangements in Malaysia" ===
This draft, prepared by Lee for the Tunku and mentioned in the previous document, included handwritten annotations by Goh. It proposed a hybrid arrangement of the two earlier options, granting Singapore full autonomy except in defence and external affairs, while the PAP would withdraw from political activity outside Singapore. Goh added that if Singapore were to exit the Malaysian political framework, it would discontinue its loan contributions for the development of Borneo. He also suggested administrative adjustments to the planned Common Market, depending on Singapore's financial autonomy.

=== "Draft Memorandum for Tunku: Constitutional re-arrangements in Malaysia" ===
This memorandum, another version of the previous document, is believed by Sim to have been submitted to the Tunku. It proposed reducing Singapore’s parliamentary delegation from 15 to 10 seats, or, under a confederation arrangement in which Singapore would have no representation in the Federal Parliament, Singapore would reduce its contributions to defence. The document also emphasised a key principle of non-interference in each other's politics, with Lee suggesting a ban on Singapore citizens participating in Malaysian politics and vice versa for "a fixed term of years". The document also reflected Lee's firm stance of Singapore having its own police force and special branch, as Philip Moore, the Deputy British High Commissioner noted.

=== "Comments from the Minister for Culture on PM's Memorandum" ===
This memorandum was Rajaratnam's response to the Cabinet document "Possible constitutional re-arrangements". While he opposed political disengagement, he recognised that the merger was creating conflicts between the Malaysian and Singaporean governments. Rajaratnam argued that the proposed constitutional changes would be merely temporary and instead urged the PAP to build support in Malaya. He also cautioned that such arrangements might be seen as Singapore yielding to Malay extremists, allowing the federal government to "cripple Singapore economically, politically".

=== "Notes on Meeting with Tunku and Dr Ismail on 31 January 1965 at the Residency, from 8.25 to 11.45 pm" ===
Lee was invited to the Malaysian prime minister's official residence, the Residency, to discuss the memorandum with Tunku and Ismail, the home affairs minister, on 31 January 1965. Lee recorded that while Tunku wished for Singapore to exit the Malaysian parliament, he still sought control over Singapore's defence and external affairs and expected continued contributions to common defence in exchange for a common market. Lee noted that this represented a reversal of Tunku's earlier suggestion to "hive off" Singapore. This document was circulated to the Singapore Cabinet a week after the meeting.

=== "Meeting with Dato Ismail on 1 February 1965 at his office, 12pm to 12.25 pm" ===
Lee met Ismail the following day before his departure, during which he learned of two further complications: the British reluctance to allow Singapore to assume full control over its internal security, (Note: Sim noted that, according to British and Australian diplomatic dispatches, Ismail opposed the federal government relinquishing control over Singapore's internal security.) and Ismail's concerns over political competition between the MCA and the PAP. This note was also circulated to the Cabinet.

=== "Notes of a Meeting with Tun Razak on 9 February 1965" ===
On 9 February, Toh Chin Chye met Tun Razak at the Malaysian National Defence Council, where they discussed the proposed constitutional rearrangements. Tun Razak also admitted that the Tunku shared his view that the merger with Singapore had been a mistake. While Toh opposed any arrangement that would reduce Singapore to a "semi-colony" of Malaysia, Tun Razak revealed that Ismail had been exploring alternative arrangements for Singapore, including a model similar to Puerto Rico.

=== "Note on the possibility of Umno continuing in Singapore after constitutional rearrangements" ===
This was a short note by Lee to the Cabinet expressing his concerns of UMNO's plans to continue operating in Singapore regardless of the constitutional rearrangements.

=== "Report of meeting between Lee Kuan Yew, Toh Chin Chye, Lim Kim San and Tunku on 15 February 1965, between 10.10 am to 10.45 am" ===
This document detailed the Tunku's visit to Singapore on 15 February 1965, during which he opened the new Singapore UMNO House. Lee observed that the British may have advised the Tunku against "hiving off" Singapore because the left-wing Barisan Sosialis was still active, thereby reinforcing the Tunku's decision to retain control over Singapore's internal affairs.

== See also ==
- Malaysia Agreement
- State of Singapore (Malaysia)
- Proclamation of Singapore
