= Proclamation of Singapore =

Document regarding the independence of Singapore

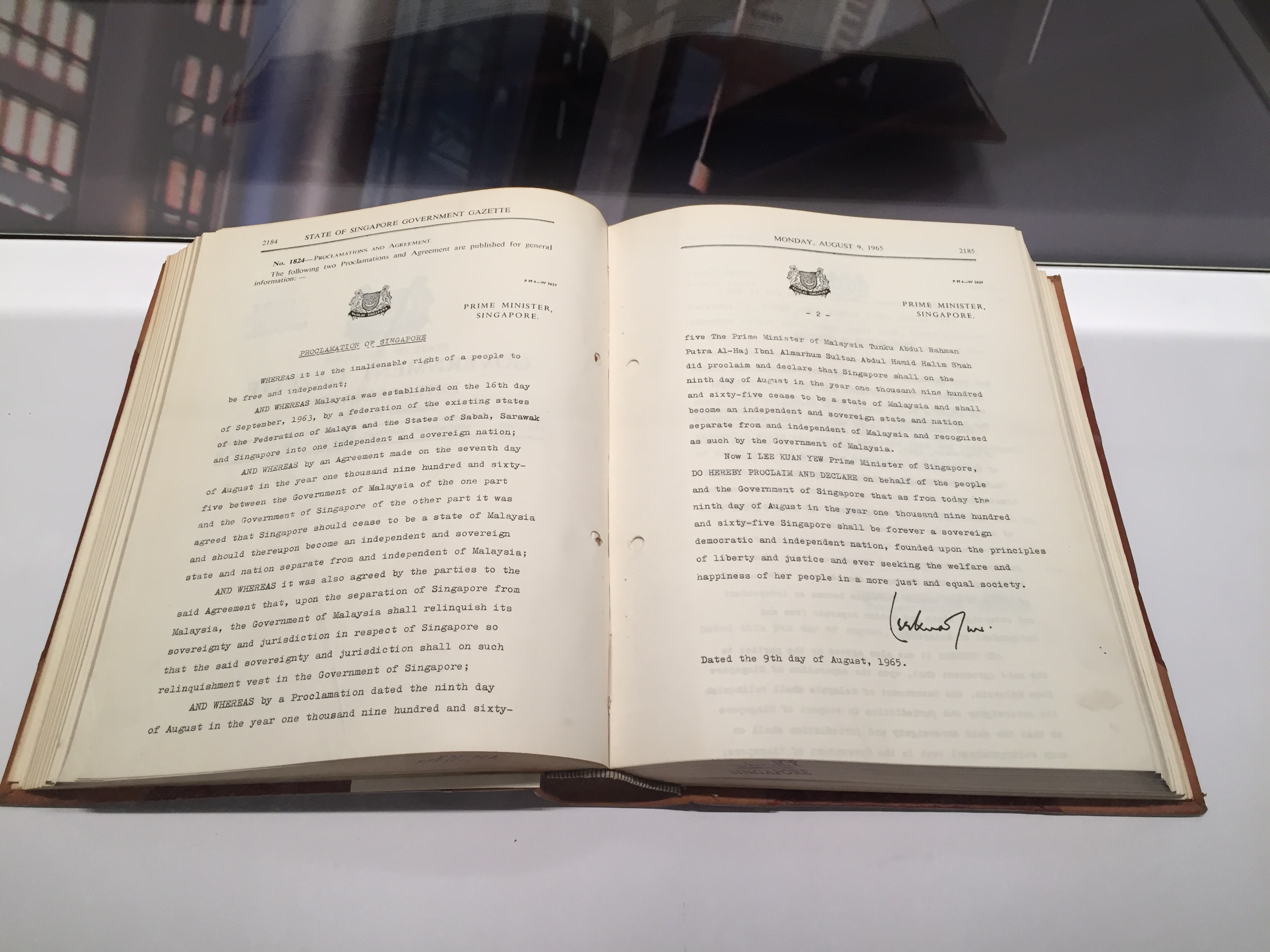
- Proclamation of Singapore, published in the Singapore Government Gazette No. 1824/1965
- Created: 9 August 1965; 60 years ago
- Location: National Archives of Singapore
- Author: Edmund W. Barker
- Signatories: Lee Kuan Yew
- Purpose: Declaring Singapore's separation from Malaysia and its establishment as a fully sovereign state

The Proclamation of Singapore (Note: Malay: Pemasyhuran Singapura; Chinese: 新加坡宣言; pinyin: Xīnjiāpō Xuānyán; Tamil: சிங்கப்பூரின் பிரகடனம், romanized: Ciṅkappūriṉ pirakaṭaṉam) was the official declaration that marked Singapore's separation from Malaysia and its emergence as an independent and sovereign nation. The document was drafted by E. W. Barker, Minister for Law, and signed by Lee Kuan Yew, the first Prime Minister of Singapore, on 9 August 1965. Its announcement marked the end of Singapore's status as a constituent state within the Federation of Malaysia, established on 16 September 1963, and signified the beginning of a new chapter of full sovereignty and national responsibility in both domestic governance and international affairs.

The Proclamation was broadcast nationwide over Radio Singapore at 10:00 SST on the same day, with the official reading performed by announcer Steven Lee. It was also published in the Government Gazette, reinforcing its legal and constitutional weight. The original signed copy of the document is currently preserved in the National Archives of Singapore, and remains an enduring artefact of the republic's founding moment.

In 2015, to commemorate Singapore's 50th year of independence, a 2012 audio recording of the Proclamation read by Lee Kuan Yew was broadcast as part of the National Day celebrations. Meanwhile, a distinct but related document, the Proclamation on Singapore, was issued by Tunku Abdul Rahman, Prime Minister of Malaysia, to formally acknowledge Singapore's independence. This Malaysian proclamation was appended to the Independence of Singapore Agreement 1965 as an annex, affirming the bilateral and international recognition of Singapore's sovereign status.

== See also ==
- Independence of Singapore Agreement 1965
- Constitution and Malaysia (Singapore Amendment) Act 1965
- Proclamation of Malaysia
  - Singapore in Malaysia
- Albatross file
- Succession of states
- Vienna Convention on Succession of States in respect of Treaties
