= 1962 Singaporean integration referendum =

Referendum on the terms of integration of Singapore into the Federation of Malaysia

- 1 September 1962
- OPTION A I support merger giving Singapore autonomy in labour, education and other agreed matters as set out in Command Paper No. 33 of 1961, with Singapore citizens automatically becoming citizens of Malaysia. OPTION B I support complete and unconditional merger for Singapore as a state on an equal basis with the other eleven states in accordance with the Constitutional documents of the Federation of Malaya. OPTION C I support Singapore entering Malaysia on terms no less favourable than those given to the Borneo territories.

Results
Choice	Votes	%
Option A	397,626	95.82%
Option B	9,422	2.27%
Option C	7,911	1.91%
Valid votes	414,959	73.89%
Invalid or blank votes	146,600	26.11%
Total votes	561,559	100.00%
Registered voters/turnout	619,867	90.59%

A referendum on the terms of integration into the Federation of Malaya was held in Singapore on 1 September 1962. There were three options. At the time of the referendum, Singapore was a self-governing country since 1959, although the British Empire still controlled external relations.

Option A, which provided for the highest level of autonomy with special status, was the option selected on nearly 96% of valid ballots. 26% of voters cast blank or invalid ballots – mostly the former – meaning that Option A was selected by 71% of those who participated in the referendum, or by 64% of registered voters. The high number of blank votes are due to an attempted boycott by the Barisan Sosialis (Socialist Front) as there was no option that rejected integration entirely.

With the results of the referendum, the states of Malaya, Singapore as well as the crown colonies of North Borneo and Sarawak merged to form the Federation of Malaysia. The union would prove tenuous due to various factors, and would end up lasting for just one year, ten months and 24 days before Singapore ultimately became a fully sovereign country.

== Background ==
The first internal challenge to merger with the Federation of Malaya came from and grew out of a political struggle between the People's Action Party (PAP) and their opponents included the Barisan Sosialis (Socialist Front), the Liberal-Socialist Party, the Workers' Party, the United People's Party and the Partai Rakyat (People's Party).

In Singapore, the PAP sought formation of Malaysia on the basis of the strong mandate it obtained during the general elections of 1959 when PAP won 43 of the 51 seats. However, this mandate became questionable when dissension within the party led to a split. In July 1961, following a debate on a vote of confidence in the government, 13 PAP Assemblymen (Note: The 13 PAP Assemblymen were Lee Siew Choh, Low Por Tuck, Wong Soon Fong, ST Bani, Sheng Nam Chin, Chan Sun Wing, Ong Chang Sam, Leong Keng Seng, Fng Yin Ching, Lin You Eng, Tee Kim Leng, Teo Hock Guan, and Tan Cheng Teng) were expelled from the PAP for abstaining from voting. Subsequently, they formed a new political party, Barisan Sosialis, reducing the PAP's majority in the Legislative Assembly to 26 of the 51 seats.

The ruling PAP was not legally obliged to call for a referendum, but did so to secure the mandate of the people. However, the Barisan Sosialis, a left-wing socialist party consisting of former PAP members were alleged that the people did not support merger, but Lee Kuan Yew declared that people did.

The referendum did not have an option of objecting to the idea of merger since as far as the PAP was concerned, it was clear that everyone wanted merger, including all of the political parties of the time. The referendum was therefore called to resolve the issue as an effort to decide objectively which option the people backed. However, the methods have been subject to debate. The legitimacy of the referendum was often challenged by Singaporean left-wingers, due to the lack of an option to vote against the merger. They had wanted the government to allow for a straightforward “Yes” or “No” question to the proposed merger but it was denied by the PAP which favoured a referendum of the merger alternatives.

=== Council of Joint Action ===
The Council of Joint Action (CJA) founded by 19 members of the Assembly (Note: The 19 Assemblymen were: From 'Barisan Sosialis Lee Siew Choh, Low Por Tuck, Wong Soon Fong, ST Bani, Sheng Nam Chin, Chan Sun Wing, Ong Chang Sam, Leong Keng Seng, Fng Yin Ching, Lin You Eng, Tee Kim Leng, Teo Hock Guan, and Tan Cheng Teng, from United People’s Party Ong Eng Guan, SV Lingam, and Ng Teng Kian from Workers' Party David Marshall and Independents Hoe Puay Choo and CH Koh) on 30 June 1962 to try to block the merger and scuttle the referendum by taking the issue before the UN Committee on Colonialism. On 6 July 1962, The CJA signed a memorandum condemning the referendum on the grounds that the proposed constitutional changes and to assure its continued right to bases in Singapore, and to protect its privileged economic position. The CJA also criticized the terms, and the lack of choice in the referendum. In the memorandum, The CJA concluded that the transfer of sovereignty would be contrary to the spirit and resolution of the United Nations General Assembly's Declaration on the Granting of Independence to Colonial Countries and Peoples. However, on 19 July 1962, the UN Committee on Colonialism voted 10-2 with five abstentions in favour of a proposal by the Committee chairman, Ambassador Chandra Shekhar Jha (CS Jha) of India, not to take cognisance of the CJA petition.

== Proposed ==
Option and symbols		Description of status
Option A	Singapore	1. Singapore would retain autonomy in educational, healthcare and labour issues.; 2. Singapore would also get to keep its own language policies with English, Malay, Mandarin and Tamil as official languages.; 3. With high amounts of autonomy, Singapore would consequently have a reduced representation in the Parliament of Malaysia, being allocated fifteen seats in the Dewan Rakyat in the first post-merger Parliament.; 4. All Singapore citizens would automatically become citizens of Malaysia.
Option B	Penang (equivalent); Malacca (equivalent)	1. Singapore would enter on terms no less favourable than the other former Straits Settlements of Penang and Malacca. This would put Singapore on an equal footing as the other Malayan states as set out in the Federation of Malaya Agreement 1948, with no more autonomy than the other Malayan states.; 2. English and Malay would be the official languages.; 3. Only those born in Singapore or descended from the Singapore-born would automatically become citizens of Malaysia.; 4. There would also be proportional representation in Parliament from Singapore.
Option C	North Borneo (equivalent); Sarawak (equivalent)	1. Singapore would enter on terms no less favourable than the Borneo territories, North Borneo and Sarawak.; 2. Only those born in Singapore or descended from the Singapore-born would automatically become citizens of Malaysia.

== Campaign ==
Strongly against the referendum, the Barisan Sosialis called for a boycott of the referendum, telling supporters to submit blank votes in protest of the "rigged" referendum, since the alternative options were not favoured by them. Over 144,000 blank votes were cast, which amounted to over a quarter of all votes (26%). That move had been anticipated by the ruling PAP government, as seen by the insertion of a clause that stated that all blank votes would be counted as a vote for the option that wins the most votes if there was no outright majority or that blank votes would be counted as Option A.

The mass media campaign fielded by both sides was extremely heated, with many of the leaders on both sides broadcasting radio shows in several languages. Lee Kuan Yew notably launched a campaign known in his own words as The Battle For Merger, to win the electorate over with a series of 12 radio talks aired between 13 September 1961 and 9 October 1961. They were broadcast in English, Malay, and Mandarin.

== Results ==
Choice	Votes	%
Option A	397,626	95.82
Option B	9,422	2.27
Option C	7,911	1.91
Total votes	414,959	100
Valid votes	414,959	73.89
Invalid votes	153	0.03
Blank votes	144,077	25.66
Unclear votes	2,370	0.42
Total votes cast	561,559	100
Registered voters/turnout	619,867	90.59
Source: Direct Democracy

== Aftermath ==
Backed by the official mandate, the Malaysia Agreement (MA63) between the United Kingdom, Federation of Malaya, North Borneo, Sarawak and Singapore was signed on 9 July 1963.

Singapore entered into merger with Malaya on 16 September 1963, marking the birth of Malaysia. This union would be short-lived due to constant disagreements between the central government of Malaysia and the state government of Singapore. With the Independence of Singapore Agreement 1965, Singapore ceased to be a state of Malaysia on 9 August 1965 and it became a fully sovereign independent country.

== See also ==
- Proclamation of Malaysia
- Singapore in Malaysia
- Constitution and Malaysia (Singapore Amendment) Act 1965
- Independence of Singapore Agreement 1965
