= Independence of Singapore Agreement 1965 =

Treaty between Malaysia and Singapore

Agreement relating to the separation of Singapore from Malaysia as an independent and sovereign state
- Independence of Singapore Agreement 1965
- Signed: 7 August 1965; 61 years ago
- Location: Kuala Lumpur, Malaysia
- Effective: 9 August 1965; 61 years ago
- Signatories: Malaysia; Singapore
- Parties: Malaysia; Singapore
- Depositary: Singapore Government dated 1 June 1966; The Secretary-General of the United Nations acting in his capacity as depositary the following: English and French; Registered No. I-8206
- Language: English

Full text
- Agreement relating to the separation of Singapore from Malaysia as an independent and sovereign state at Wikisource

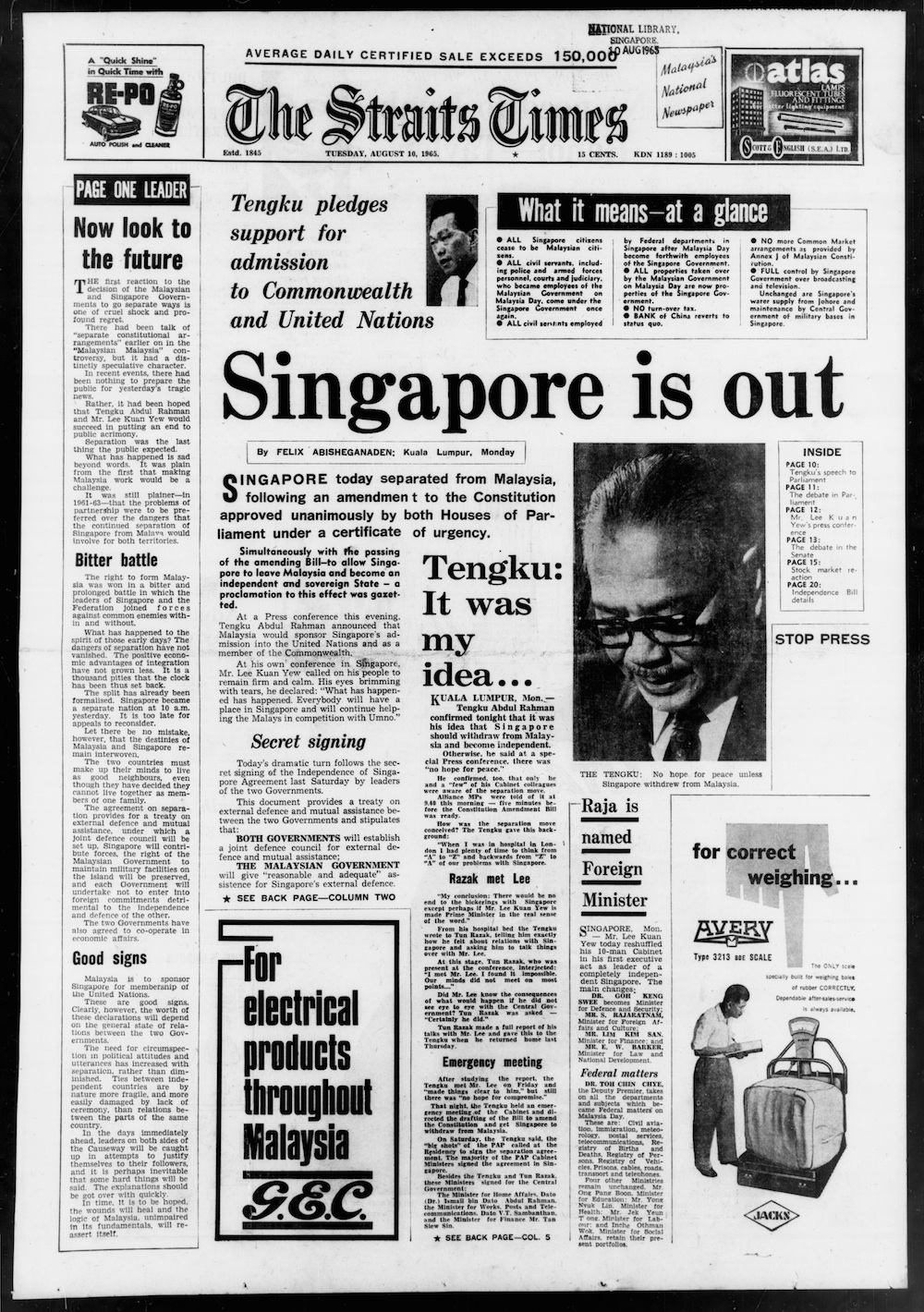
"Singapore is out." The headline on page 1 of The Straits Times newspaper on 10 August 1965.

The Independence of Singapore Agreement 1965 was a pivotal agreement concluded between the governments of Malaysia and Singapore on 7 August 1965. It provided the legal and constitutional framework for Singapore's formal secession from Malaysia, wherein it ceased to be a constituent state and assumed the status of an independent and sovereign nation. The terms of the agreement encompassed a Proclamation to be issued by Malaysian Prime Minister Tunku Abdul Rahman, while a separate Proclamation of Singapore was delivered by Singaporean Prime Minister Lee Kuan Yew. It also included a draft for the Constitution and Malaysia (Singapore Amendment) Act 1965, a constitutional amendment to be passed by the Parliament of Malaysia to separate Singapore from Malaysia.

Pursuant to this accord, Singapore was irrevocably and unambiguously separated from Malaysia with effect from 9 August 1965, thereby rendering the Malaysia Agreement inapplicable in so far as it pertained to Singapore. Subsequently, Singapore acceded to membership in the United Nations on 20 September 1965, following a unanimous resolution of the General Assembly. The Singapore Act 1966, enacted by the Parliament of the United Kingdom a year later, gave statutory recognition to the agreement and admitted Singapore into the Commonwealth of Nations with retrospective effect from the date of independence.

== Background ==
Singapore attained sovereignty on 3 June 1959 from the United Kingdom, becoming a self-governing colony with full internal autonomy. Nonetheless, control over its external affairs remained vested in the British colonial administration, reflecting a constitutional arrangement akin to that of the Irish Free State. Between 1959 and 1963, Singapore operated as a de facto state in all domestic matters. On 16 September 1963, the Proclamation of Malaysia was promulgated, signifying the formation of a new federation encompassing four constituent territories: the Federation of Malaya, North Borneo (now Sabah), Sarawak and Singapore. By this juncture, Sarawak, Sabah and Singapore were all self-governing colonies, and upon accession to the federation, Singapore assumed the status of an autonomous state, parallel to that of the other two Bornean entities.

Prior to the final agreement, an alternative constitutional model in the form of a looser confederation had been proposed. Under this scheme, Singapore would revert to the self-governing status it had enjoyed between 1959 and 1963, but within a broader Malaysian framework. Singapore would raise forces as are necessary for the defence of Singapore and place them at the disposal of the Malaysian Government in times of national need. Policy for both defence and external defence would be discussed in a Council of Ministers from both sides with the Malaysian Prime Minister having the casting vote in case of disagreement. Crucially, Singapore's tax revenue would be remitted to the federal government. However, it would forfeit legislative representation in the Malaysian Parliament. This provoked significant opposition, most notably from Lee Kuan Yew, who argued to Tunku Abdul Rahman that "Singapore cannot become a colony in Malaysia", invoking the principle of no taxation without representation. British authorities also objected to the proposal, fearing that a diluted federal structure might engender instability at a time when regional tensions were high due to the Konfrontasi with Indonesia.

=== Legacy ===
The brief union would ultimately prove precarious owing to a confluence of factors, most notably profound political and economic divergences. It endured for merely 1 year, 10 months and 24 days before the terms of the agreement came into force on 9 August 1965. By contrast, Sarawak and Sabah have remained part of Malaysia.

== See also ==
- Albatross file
- Constitution and Malaysia (Singapore Amendment) Act 1965
- Malaysia Act 1963
- Malaysia Agreement
- Singapore Act 1966
- Succession of states
- United Nations General Assembly Resolution 1514 (XV)
- Vienna Convention on Succession of States in respect of Treaties
