= Proclamation of Malaysia =

Formal declaration on 16 September 1963

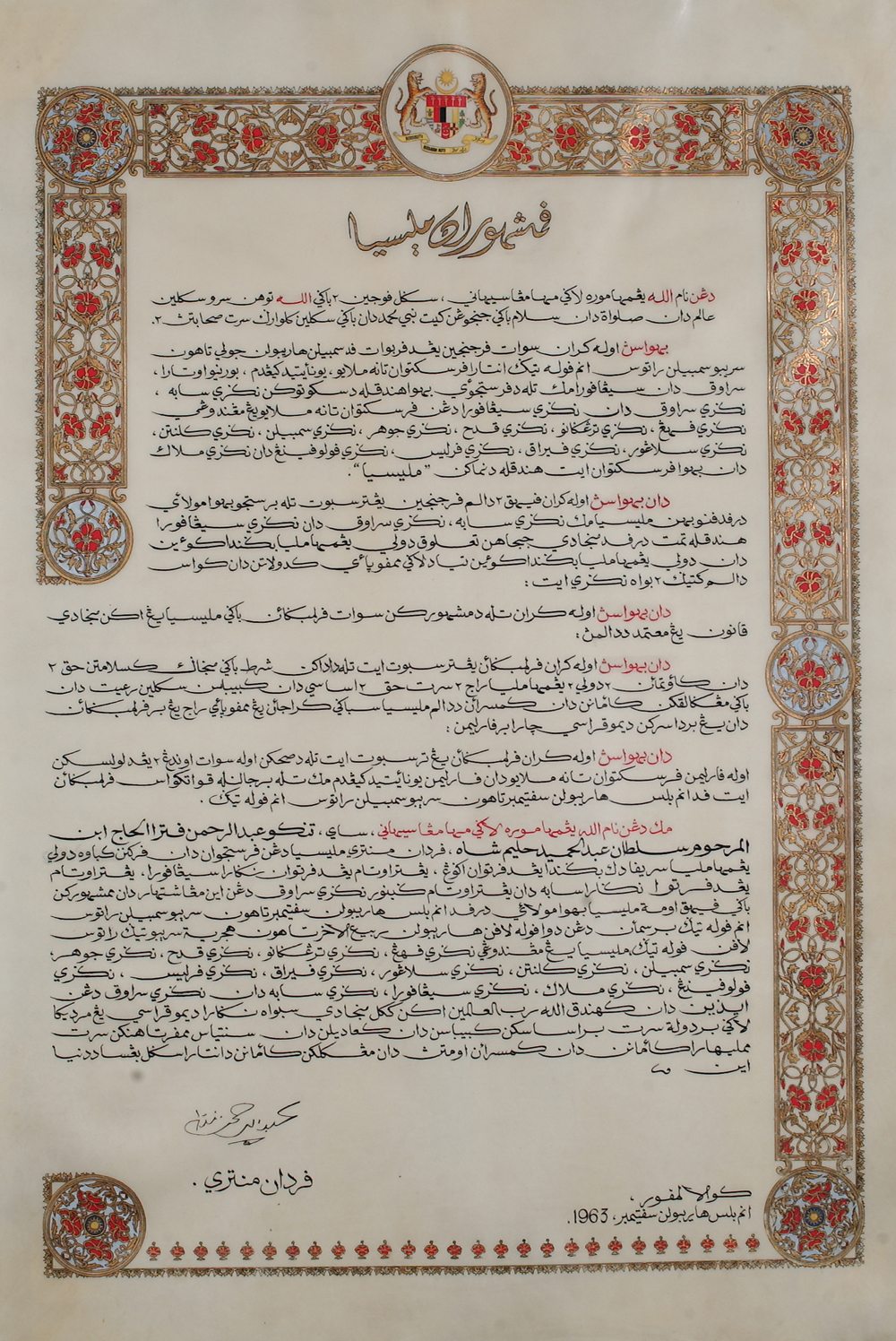
- Malay-language Proclamation of Malaysia, written in the Jawi script
- Ratified: 16 September 1963; 63 years ago
- Location: National Archives of Malaysia
- Signatories: Tunku Abdul Rahman
- Purpose: To announce the formation of Malaysia

The Proclamation of Malaysia (Malay: Pemasyhuran Malaysia; Jawi: ڤمشهوران مليسيا) was a formal declaration, issued in both English and Malay (using the Jawi script), that announced the formation of a new political entity known as Malaysia. This newly constituted federation resulted from the union of the Federation of Malaya with the self-governing State of Singapore and the British crown colonies of North Borneo and Sarawak. The declaration followed the signing of the Malaysia Agreement and the enactment of the Malaysia Act 1963 in July of that year, both of which laid the legal and constitutional foundation for the merger.

The union officially came into force on 16 September 1963, a date that has since assumed national significance in Malaysia's historical narrative. On that day, the proclamation was delivered by Prime Minister Tunku Abdul Rahman during a public ceremony held at Stadium Merdeka in Kuala Lumpur, marking the symbolic and legal establishment of Malaysia as a sovereign federation of equal partners.

== Text ==
=== English ===
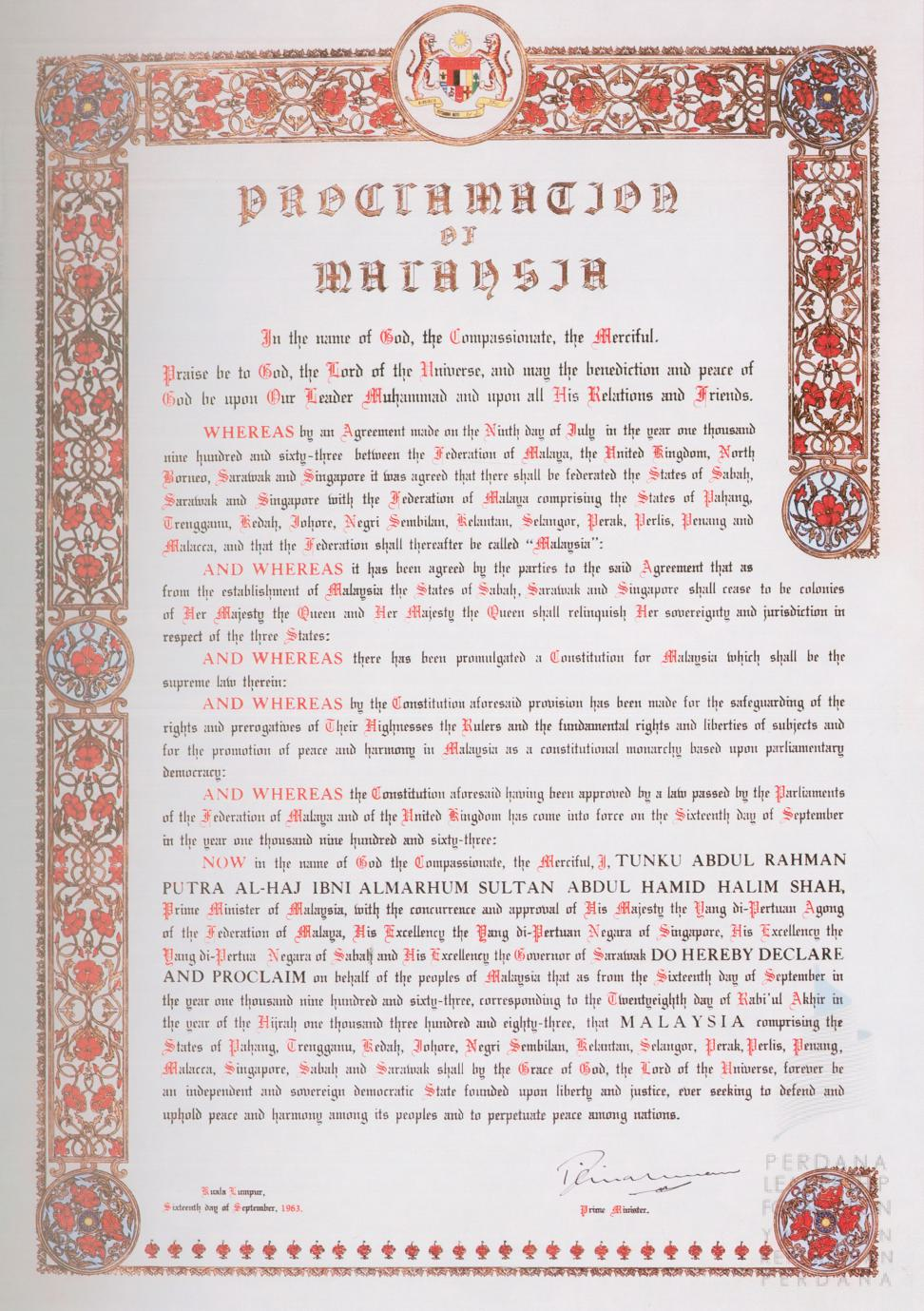
English version of the Proclamation of Malaysia

Proclamation of Malaysia

In the name of Allah, the Compassionate, the Merciful.

Praise be to God, the Lord of the Universe, and may the benediction and peace of God be upon Our Leader Muhammad and upon all his Relations and Friends.

WHEREAS by an Agreement made on the Ninth day of July in the year one thousand nine hundred and sixty-three between the Federation of Malaya, the United Kingdom, North Borneo, Sarawak and Singapore it was agreed that there shall be federated the States of Sabah, Sarawak and Singapore with the Federation of Malaya comprising the states of Pahang, Trengganu, Kedah, Johore, Negri Sembilan, Kelantan, Selangor, Perak, Perlis, Penang and Malacca, and that the Federation shall thereafter be called "MALAYSIA":

AND WHEREAS it has been agreed by the parties to the said Agreement that as from the establishment of Malaysia the States of Sabah, Sarawak and Singapore shall cease to be colonies of Her Majesty the Queen and Her Majesty the Queen shall relinquish Her sovereignty and jurisdiction in respect of the three States:

AND WHEREAS there has been promulgated a Constitution for Malaysia which shall be the supreme law therein:

AND WHEREAS by the Constitution aforesaid provision has been made for the safeguarding of the rights and prerogatives of Their Highnesses the Rulers and the fundamental rights and liberties of subjects and for the promotion of peace and harmony in Malaysia as a constitutional monarchy based upon parliamentary democracy:

AND WHEREAS the Constitution aforesaid having been approved by a law passed by the Parliaments of the Federation of Malaya and of the United Kingdom has come into force on the Sixteenth day of September in the year one thousand nine hundred and sixty-three.

NOW in the name of God, the Compassionate, the Merciful, I, TUNKU ABDUL RAHMAN PUTRA AL-HAJ IBNI ALMARHUM SULTAN ABDUL HAMID HALIM SHAH, Prime Minister of Malaysia, with the concurrence and approval of His Majesty the Yang di-Pertuan Agong of the Federation of Malaya, His Excellency the Yang di-Pertuan Negara of Singapore, His Excellency the Yang di-Pertua Negara of Sabah and His Excellency the Governor of Sarawak, DO HEREBY DECLARE AND PROCLAIM on behalf of the peoples of Malaysia that as from the Sixteenth day of September in the year one thousand nine hundred and sixty-three, corresponding to the Twenty-eighth day of Rabi'ul Akhir in the year of the Hijrah one thousand three hundred and eighty-three,

That MALAYSIA comprising the States of Pahang, Trengganu, Kedah, Johore, Negri Sembilan, Kelantan, Selangor, Perak, Perlis, Penang, Malacca, Singapore, Sabah and Sarawak shall by the Grace and Blessings of God, the Lord of the Universe, forever be an independent and sovereign democratic State founded upon liberty and justice, ever seeking to defend and uphold peace and harmony among its people and to perpetuate peace among nations.

Prime Minister.

Kuala Lumpur,

Sixteenth day of September, 1963

== Sarawakian proclamation ==
The following is the full text of a proclamation issued and read out by the chief minister of Sarawak in Kuching on 16 September 1963:

Proclamation

Whereas one of the nine Cardinal Principles of the Rule of the English Rajahs was that the goal of self-government shall always be kept in mind and that the people of Sarawak shall be entrusted in due course with the Governance of themselves;

And Whereas this principle accords with the policy which Her Majesty’s Government of the United Kingdom and Northern Ireland have always pursued in the Governance of those territories of the Commonwealth for whose affairs Her Majesty’s Government have been responsible;

And Whereas in pursuance of this principle Her Majesty’s Government by an agreement entered into on the 9th day of July, 1963, with the Government of the Federation of Malaya, the Government of the State of Singapore and the Governments of the Colonies of Sarawak and North Borneo it was agreed that the State of Singapore and the Colonies of Sarawak and North Borneo shall be federated with the Federation of Malaya, and that the said Federation shall be known as Malaysia:

And Whereas Constitutions for Malaysia and for the States of Sarawak, Sabah and Singapore have been promulgated;

And Whereas by a Proclamation made under Section 2 of the Malaysia Act the 16th day of September, 1963 has been proclaimed as Malaysia Day;

Now therefore I, STEPHEN KALONG NINGKAN, the Chief Minister of Sarawak, DO HEREBY PROCLAIM that Sarawak has this day attained independence as a State of Malaysia.

== Singaporean proclamation ==
The following is the full text of a proclamation issued by the prime minister of Singapore upon its merger with Malaysia:

Proclamation

WHEREAS it is the inalienable right of a people to be free of foreign domination, to be independent and to form a government of its own choice;

AND WHEREAS in a Referendum held on the 1st day of September, 1962, the people of Singapore expressed their desire to seek this independence through federation with Malaya, Sabah and Sarawak to form an independent state of Malaysia;

AND WHEREAS an Agreement was reached in London on the 9th day of July, 1963 between the Governments of Singapore, Malaya, Sabah, Sarawak and the United Kingdom that Singapore shall on the 31st day of August, 1963 join with the existing states of the Federation of Malaya, and the States of Sabah and Sarawak in a State of Malaysia;

AND WHEREAS for diverse reasons the said federation did not come into being on the 31st day of August, 1963, whereupon Singapore asserted her right to freedom and took over powers over defence and foreign affairs;

AND WHEREAS on the 11th day of September, 1963 Singapore agreed to join Malaysia on the 16th day of September, 1963;

AND WHEREAS a new constitution for the State of Malaysia and the State of Singapore has been established as the supreme law thereafter;

Now, I, LEE KUAN YEW, Prime Minister of Singapore, do hereby proclaim and declare, on behalf of the people of Singapore, that as from today, the 16th day of September, 1963, Singapore shall be forever a part of the sovereign democratic and independent State of Malaysia, founded upon the principles of liberty and justice and ever seeking the welfare and happiness of her people in a more just and more equal society.

== See also ==
- United Nations General Assembly Resolution 1514 (XV)
- United Nations General Assembly Resolution 1541 (XV)
- Proclamation of Singapore
