= Mohammad Noordin Sopiee =

Mohammad Noordin bin Sopiee (26 December 1944 – 29 December 2005) was a Malaysian academic born in Penang. He was the chairman and chief executive officer of Institute of Strategic and International Studies (ISIS), a major think tank of Malaysia.

He is the pioneer in creating the blueprint for Vision 2020. A Vision which define Malaysia path to Social, Economics and Political development.

== Biography ==
He married Puan Sri Shamsiah Hashim in 1968 and they have three sons: Johan, Shamsul and Amirul. On 29 December 2005, he died in Kuala Lumpur and was buried at Bukit Kiara Muslim Cemetery. Malaysia's top leaders and important figures attended his funeral and mourned his death. In numerous interviews given by his youngest son, Amirul, he said that he had learned a lot from his father who was a simple and enigmatic man. He would do anything for his country, said Amirul.

Throughout 1963, Sopiee ran a series of seminars pertaining to Indonesian threats to Malaysia in the sphere of psychological warfare.

== Honour ==
=== Honour of Malaysia ===
- Malaysia
  - Commander of the Order of Loyalty to the Crown of Malaysia (P.S.M.) (1997)
