= National Archives of Singapore =

Coordinates: 1.29332°N 103.84856°E

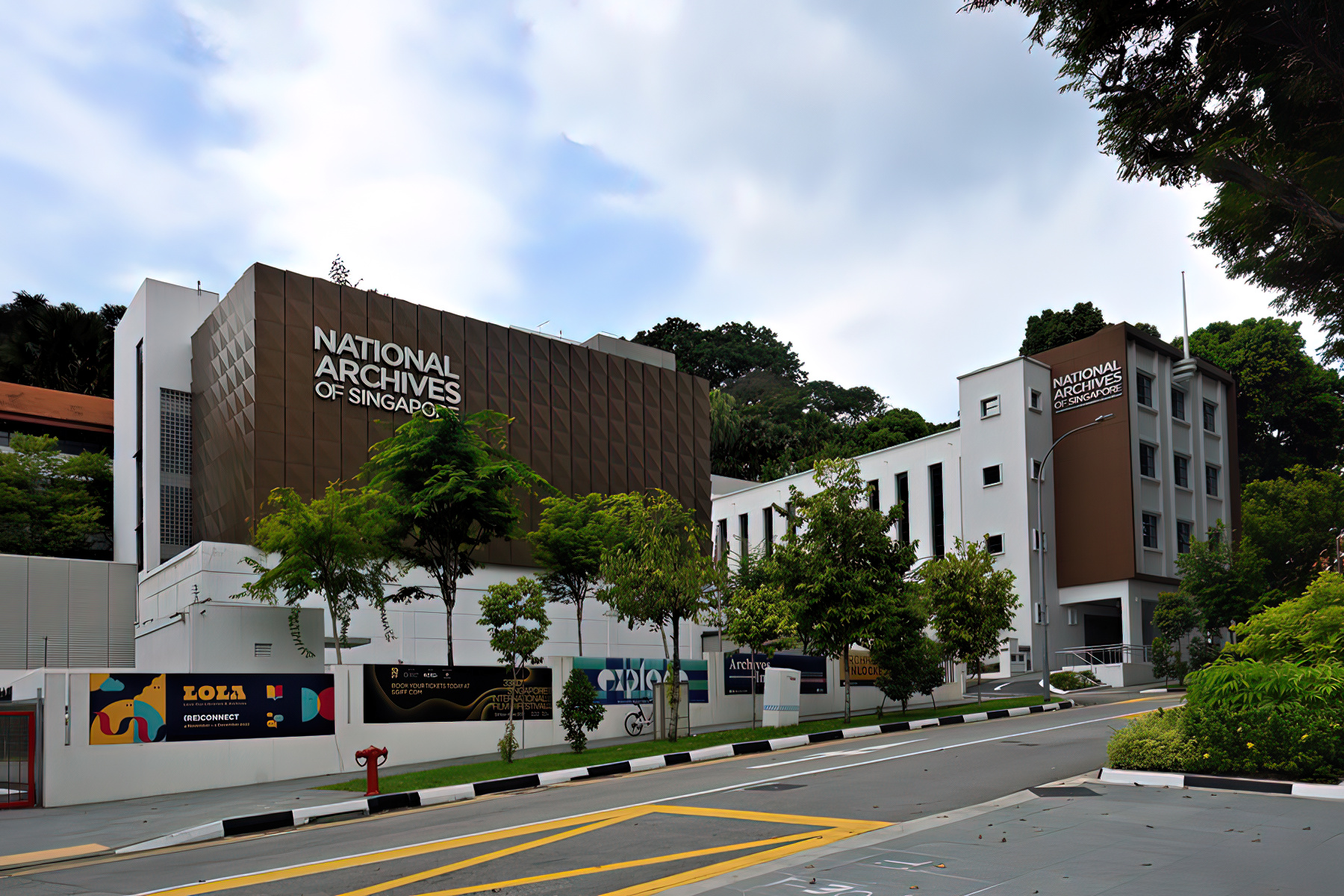
The National Archives of Singapore at 1 Canning Rise, photographed in 2022

The National Archives of Singapore (NAS) (Malay: Arkib Negara Singapura, Chinese: 新加坡国家档案馆, Tamil: சிங்கப்பூர் தேசிய காப்பகம்) is the national archives of Singapore. It was formed in August 1993 with the merging of the National Archives and the Oral History Department. The NAS is responsible for the collection and management of records relating to the nation's political, social and economic history. NAS also identifies and collects records of historical significance from local and overseas private sources. In 1993, both NAS and the National Museum of Singapore were brought under the administration of the National Heritage Board. Since 1 November 2012, the NAS was brought under the administration of the National Library Board (NLB).

The National Archives was originally established in 1968 for the preservation and administration of the nation's archives. It holds records as far back as 1800, 19 years before the arrival of Stamford Raffles and the founding of the modern nation. The Oral History Centre documents the history of Singapore through the use of oral history methodology. NAS has a selection of archival materials available for viewing by the public, including public records, building plans, oral history recordings, photographs, electronic records and an audio-visual collection of microfilms, films, videotapes, colour slides, negatives and maps. Nowadays, the NAS has improved access to archives by allowing researchers and history enthusiasts to access archives online. Requests for archives can be made online.

In 2017, the NAS building underwent an 18-month revamp, the first time since it moved to 1 Canning Rise in 1997. The revamp fixed wear and tear, including water-seepage and paint peeling, enhanced the look of the building with restorations to reflect the building's past and allowing the building to blend with its surroundings. The building reopened on 7 April 2019 with better facilities, with an expanded Oldham Theatre taking 132 people instead of 44 before, three new oral history recording studios, microfilm readers and expanded conservation labs, as well as lifts installed and levelled floors for disabled people.
