= History of the Malaysian Constitution =

The foundation of the Constitution of Malaysia was laid on 10 September 1877. It began with the first meeting of the Council of State in Perak, where the Yang di-Pertuan Agong first started to assert their influence in the Malay states. Under the terms of the Pangkor Engagement of 1874 between the Sultan of Perak and the British, the Sultan was obliged to accept a British Resident. Hugh Low, the second British Resident, convinced the Sultan to set up advisory Council of State, the forerunner of the state legislative assembly. Similar Councils were constituted in the other Malay states as and when they came under British protection.

Originally playing an advisory role, the function of the council was later extended to include both legislative and executive functions. This continued until 1948 when the Federation of Malaya was formed by two agreements, namely the State Agreement and the Federation of Malaya Agreement 1948.

The State Agreement was of great significance to Malaysia's constitutional development. By virtue of this agreement, the Malay Rulers with the advice and concurrence of the traditional chiefs and elders of the states promulgated their respective State Constitutions except for Johor and Terengganu where Constitutions had already been in place since 1895 and 1911 respectively. The Rulers were also required to distinguish the legislative power in their respective states from the executive power, by constituting a legislative body, called the Council of State and State Executive Council whose advice he was required to obtained.

The Federation of Malaya Agreement 1948 that served as the core for the current federal system of central government was concluded as a compromise to the previously much-opposed Malayan Union established back in 1946. The Federation consisted of the former Federated Malay States (comprising Perak, Selangor, Pahang and Negeri Sembilan), the former Unfederated Malay States (comprising Kedah, Perlis, Kelantan, Terengganu and Johor), as well as the former Straits Settlements of Penang and Malacca.

The federal government comprised the High Commissioner, an Executive Council and Legislative Council. The 1948 agreement also provided for a Conference of Rulers with its own elected chairman. Each of the states had its own Executive Council and Council of States to deal with all matters not specifically reserved to the Federation. The Federal Government was responsible for defence, the police, and the railways, labour, broadcasting, post and finance. This 1948 agreement remained in force with some essential amendments, until 1957 when the Federation of Malaya gained its independence.

A constitutional conference was held in London from 18 January to 6 February 1956 when the British promised independence and self-government to the Federation of Malaya. It was attended by a delegation from the Federation of Malaya, consisting of four representatives of the Malay Rulers, the Chief Minister of the Federation (Tunku Abdul Rahman) and three other ministers, and also by the British High Commissioner in Malaya and his advisers.

The conference proposed the appointment of a commission to devise a constitution for a fully self-governing and independent Federation of Malaya. This proposal was accepted by and the Malay Rulers. Accordingly, pursuant to such agreement, the Reid Commission, consisting of constitutional experts from fellow Commonwealth countries and headed by, a distinguished Lord-of-Appeal-in-Ordinary, was appointed to make recommendations for a suitable constitution. The report of the Commission was completed on 11 February 1957. The report was then examined by a working party appointed by the British Government, the Conference of Rulers and the Government of the Federation of Malaya and the Federal Constitution was enacted on the basis of its recommendations.

The Federal Constitution, annexed under the Federation of Malaya Agreement 1957, was approved by the Federal Legislative Council through the passing of Federal Constitution Ordinance 1957 on 15 August 1957, with the ordinance became effective on 27 August. The Federal Constitution was also approved by the legislatures of each Malay States through an Enactment. The Federal Constitution officially came into force on 31 August 1957 and Malaya achieved its independence on that day.

The constitutional machinery devised to bring the new constitution into force consisted of:

- In the United Kingdom, the Federation of Malaya Independence Act 1957, together with the Orders in Council made under it. The Federation of Malaya Independence Act, 1957 passed by the British Parliament gave parliamentary approval to Her Britannic Majesty Queen to terminate her sovereignty and jurisdiction in respect of the Straits Settlements of Malacca and Penang and all powers and jurisdiction in respect of the Malay States or the Federation as a whole.
- The Federation of Malaya Agreement 1957, made on 5 August 1957 between the British High Commissioner on behalf of Queen and the Malay Rulers. The Agreement contained the new Constitution of the Federation of Malaya (and the new state constitutions of Penang and Malacca).
- In the Federation, the Federal Constitution Ordinance 1957, passed on 15 August 1957 by the Federal Legislative Council of the Federation of Malaya formed under the Federation of Malaya Agreement 1948.
- In each of the Malay states, State Enactments, and in Malacca and Penang, resolutions of the State Legislatures, approving and giving force of law to the Federal Constitution.

The Federal Constitution was significantly amended when Sabah, Sarawak, and Singapore joined the Federation to form Malaysia in 1963. Two years later, Singapore was separated from the Federation and became an independent country on 9 August 1965.
