= History of the State of Singapore (Malaysia) =

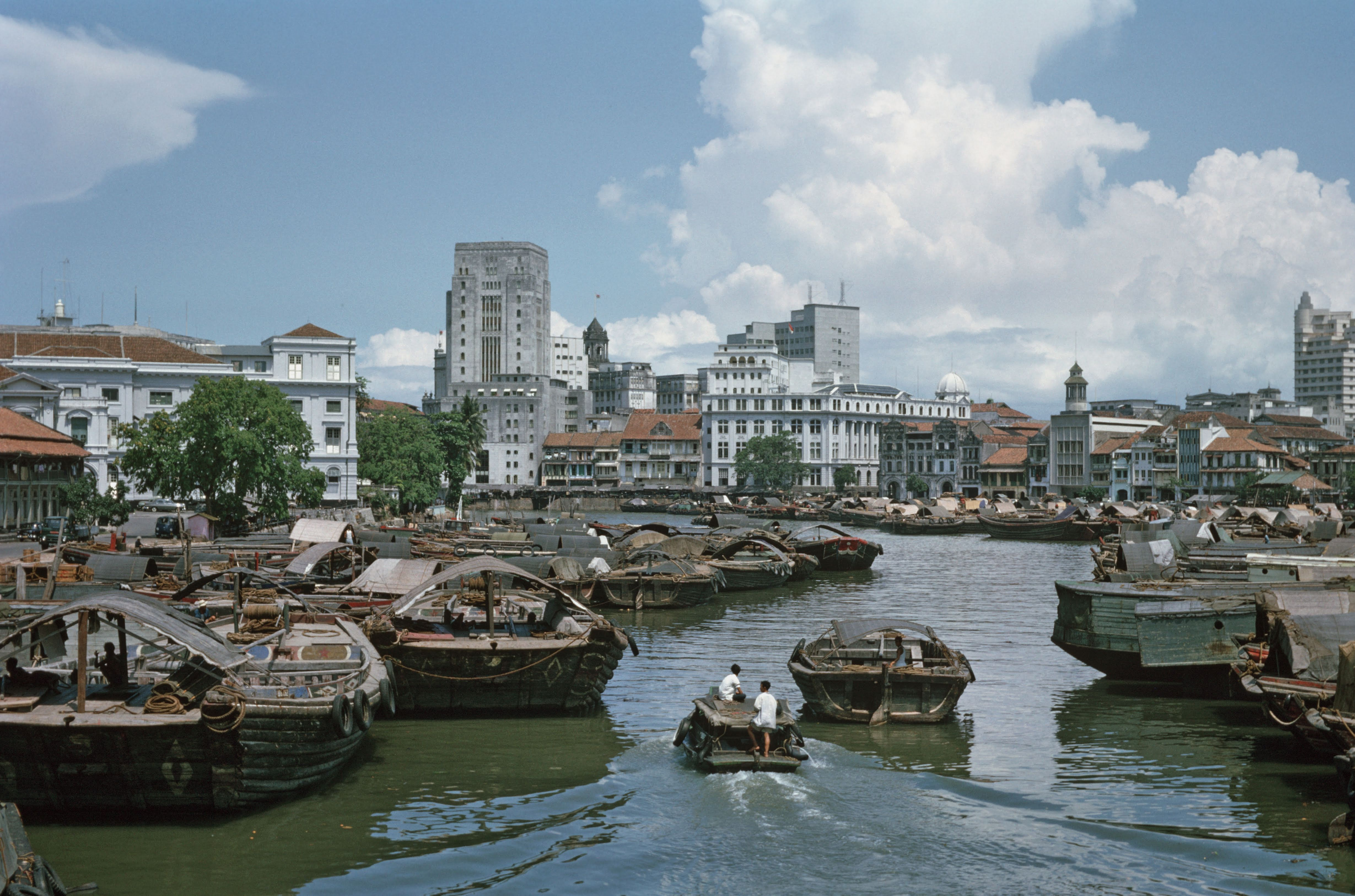
Singapore River in 1963

This article details the history of Singapore as part of Malaysia from 1963 to 1965.

== Prelude to merger ==
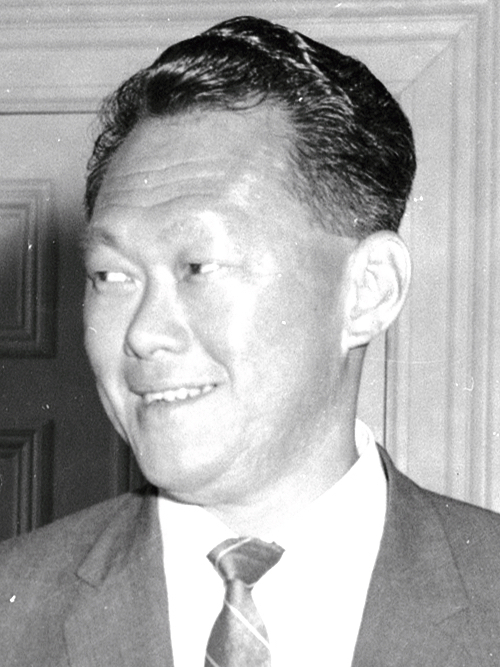
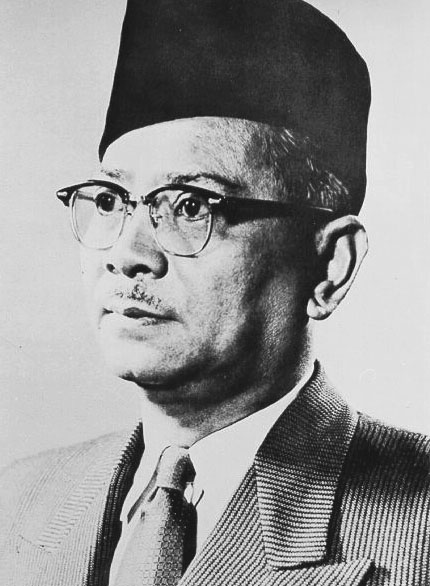
Lee Kuan Yew and Tunku Abdul Rahman

Singaporean politicians, beginning with David Marshall in 1955, repeatedly sought merger with the Federation by approaching Tunku Abdul Rahman but were turned down on multiple occasions. Tunku was initially opposed to Singapore's inclusion in the Federation. His main concern was the need to preserve the racial balance in Malaya, UMNO's position in the Alliance Party and the broader framework of Malay political dominance. Adding Singapore with its majority Chinese population would have tipped the demographic scale, and the new federation would see 3.6 million Chinese outnumbering 3.4 million Malays which Tunku considered a "serious risk".

Tunku's greater concern was an independent Singapore outside the Federation especially if it aligned with hostile or communist forces. As part of the decolonisation process and Britain's gradual withdrawal from Malaya, constitutional talks between the British Colonial Office in London and the Legislative Assembly of Singapore had already led to the 1958 State of Singapore Constitution. This established a fully elected and self-governing 51-seat Legislative Assembly in 1959. Tunku feared that further constitutional changes would take Singapore beyond the influence of either Malaya or Britain. British officials warned that a "batik curtain" might descend across the Straits of Johor and that Singapore could become a Southeast Asian version of communist Cuba. This concern grew stronger on 29 April 1961 when Ong Eng Guan of the United Peoples' Party defeated the PAP in the Hong Lim by-election. Ong, a former PAP minister, had tapped into growing dissatisfaction and posed a real political challenge.

Tunku was also watching Indonesia which under Sukarno's Guided Democracy had become more nationalist and expansionist. Its military campaign in the West New Guinea conflict suggested further ambitions in the region, and Tunku feared that Malaya could be next. With these concerns in mind, he had already begun to consider merger as early as June 1960, though this was not public knowledge. At a Commonwealth of Nations prime ministers' meeting, he told David Drummond, 8th Earl of Perth of the Colonial Office that a wider plan might be workable if it included not just Singapore but also British Borneo. This "Grand Design" appealed to Tunku as it would add population and resources and the combined number of indigenous Borneans and Peninsular Malays (collectively called Bumiputera) could help offset the number of Chinese from Singapore.

=== Referendum ===
Following Singapore's attainment of self-government in 1959 and a major split within the PAP in 1961, the splinter party Barisan Sosialis (BS) challenged the government's push for merger with Malaya. To affirm public support, the PAP held a referendum on 1 September 1962 offering three options, all involving merger under different terms. Option A, backed by the PAP, proposed full internal self-government and automatic Malaysian citizenship. Options B and C offered less favourable arrangements. BS opposed the lack of a choice against merger and urged voters to submit blank ballots. Voter turnout was over 90 percent, with Option A receiving about 71 percent of valid votes, while roughly 26 percent of ballots were left blank. Although the referendum did not include a rejection option, the result gave the PAP political legitimacy to proceed with merger negotiations with Malaya.

=== Malaysia Agreement ===
Singapore–specific provisions included:

- Singapore would retain control on education and labour. Defence, external affairs and internal security would come under the jurisdiction of the federal government.
- Singapore would have only 15 seats in the Parliament of Malaysia instead of 25 seats as was entitled by the size of its electorate. In return for this, increased autonomy was guaranteed.
- Singapore would get to keep its own language policies with English, Malay, Mandarin and Tamil as official languages.
- Singapore would pay 40% of its total revenue to the federal government. It would disburse a $150 million loan to the Borneo territories, of which two-thirds would be interest-free for five years. A common market would be implemented over twelve years.
- Singaporean citizens would become Malaysian citizens while retaining their Singaporean citizenship, but they would be allowed to vote only in Singaporean elections and not in elections held elsewhere in Malaysia. Conversely, Malaysian citizens from other parts of Malaysia would be unable to vote in Singaporean elections.

== Merger ==
The merger between Singapore and Malaya was originally scheduled for 31 August 1963 to coincide with the official independence day of Malaya. However, it was postponed by Tunku Abdul Rahman to 16 September 1963 to accommodate a United Nations (UN) mission to North Borneo and Sarawak to determine whether the people there genuinely supported joining the Federation. This delay was prompted by strong objections from Indonesia, which opposed the formation of Malaysia and questioned the legitimacy of the merger in the Borneo territories.

Nonetheless, on 31 August 1963, Lee Kuan Yew stood before a crowd at the Padang in Singapore and unilaterally declared Singapore's full independence from Britain, to the annoyance of some British and Malaysian leaders who felt that such an announcement was premature. On 16 September 1963, Malaysia Day, which also marked Lee's fortieth birthday, he returned to the Padang and this time proclaimed Singapore's entry into Malaysia. Pledging his loyalty to the federal government, Tunku and his colleagues, Lee called for "an honourable relationship between the states and the Central Government, a relationship between brothers, and not a relationship between masters and servants."

== Reasons for merger ==
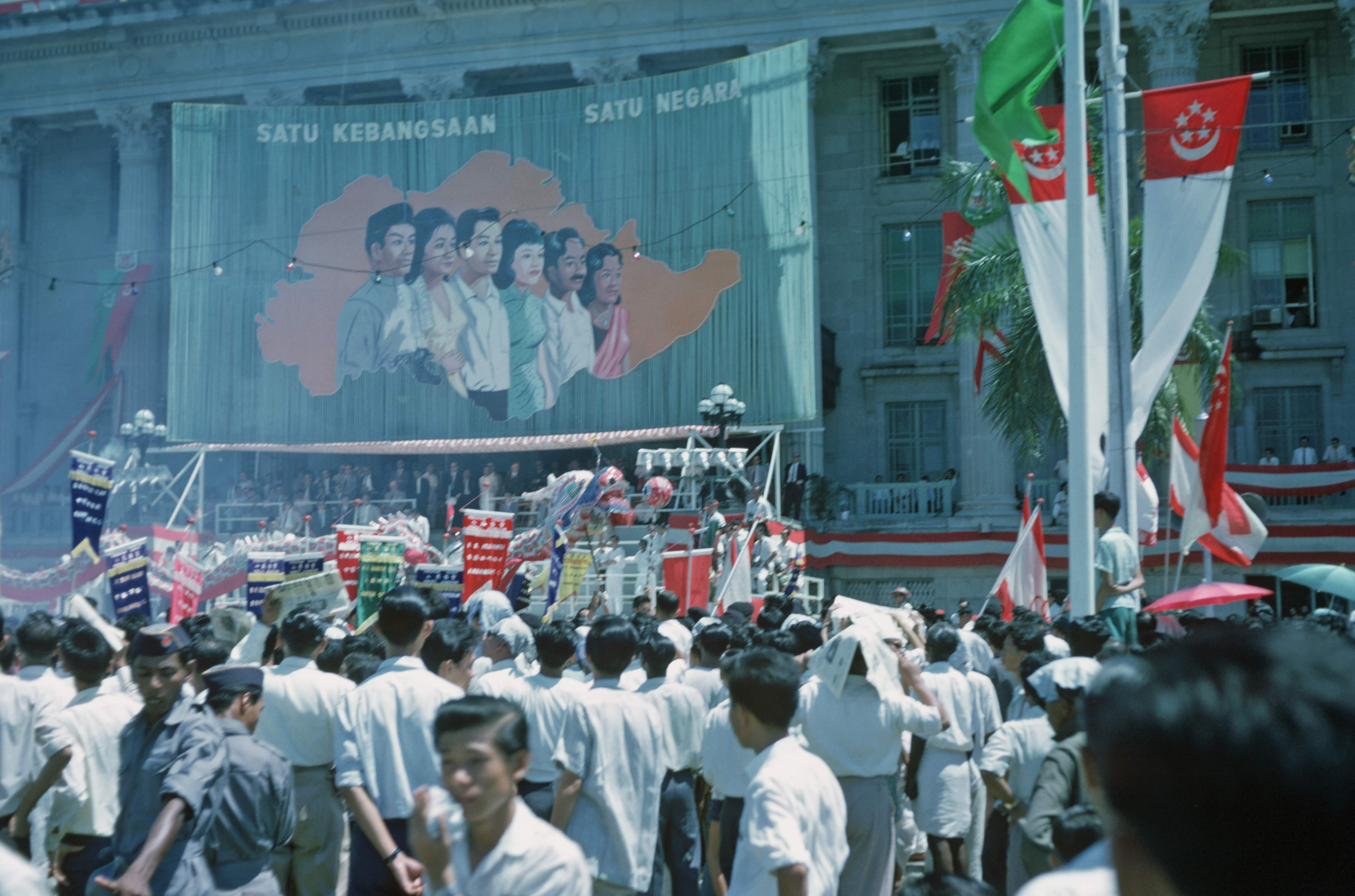
Singapore's National Day from 1960 to 1964 was initially held on 3 June, to commemorate gaining self-governance from Britain in 1959.

=== Full independence from Britain ===
Singapore sought merger with Malaya as the only viable path to complete independence from British colonial rule. Although Singapore had attained self-governance in 1959, it remained under British control in matters of defence and foreign affairs. Anti-colonial sentiment had deepened since the British colonisation of Singapore in 1819, especially after the British failure to defend Singapore during the Japanese invasion in February 1942. These grievances were further reflected in labour unrest and civil disturbances, including the National Service riots and the Hock Lee bus riots of the 1950s. Such events symbolised the growing desire among the local population for decolonisation and self-rule. By merging with Malaya, Singapore would eliminate the British justification of continued rule on the pretext of containing communism, thereby achieving full sovereignty.

=== Economic security ===
Singapore also pursued merger with Malaya for strong economic reasons. In the early 1960s, the island was grappling with severe unemployment, which had become the most pressing concern for the PAP government following its assumption of power in 1959. A shortage of natural resources, a relatively low literacy rate among the local population and the absence of a hinterland all contributed to the worsening employment crisis. Malaya, by contrast, was a much larger territory endowed with abundant natural resources. Singapore sought to capitalise on Malaya's economic strengths by proposing a common market that would benefit both parties. The PAP government believed that merger would ease the burden. This economic policy formed a key part of the PAP's broader strategy to stabilise the economy and maintain its political mandate in Singapore.

=== Anti-communism ===
The merger was also conceived as a strategic measure to suppress communism in both Singapore and Malaya. The state of emergency declared by the British from 1948 to 1960 reflected the perceived intensity of the communist insurgency by the Malayan Communist Party (MCP), which aimed to overthrow colonial rule and establish a communist regime across Peninsular Malaysia. Although emergency rule was formally lifted in 1960, the broader anti-communist sentiment persisted throughout Southeast Asia. Malaya viewed merger as a means of consolidating political stability and bolstering resistance to communist influence within the region.

== Merger era ==
Although the merger between Singapore and Malaya was initially met with optimism, underlying tensions soon began to surface.

=== Economic disagreements ===
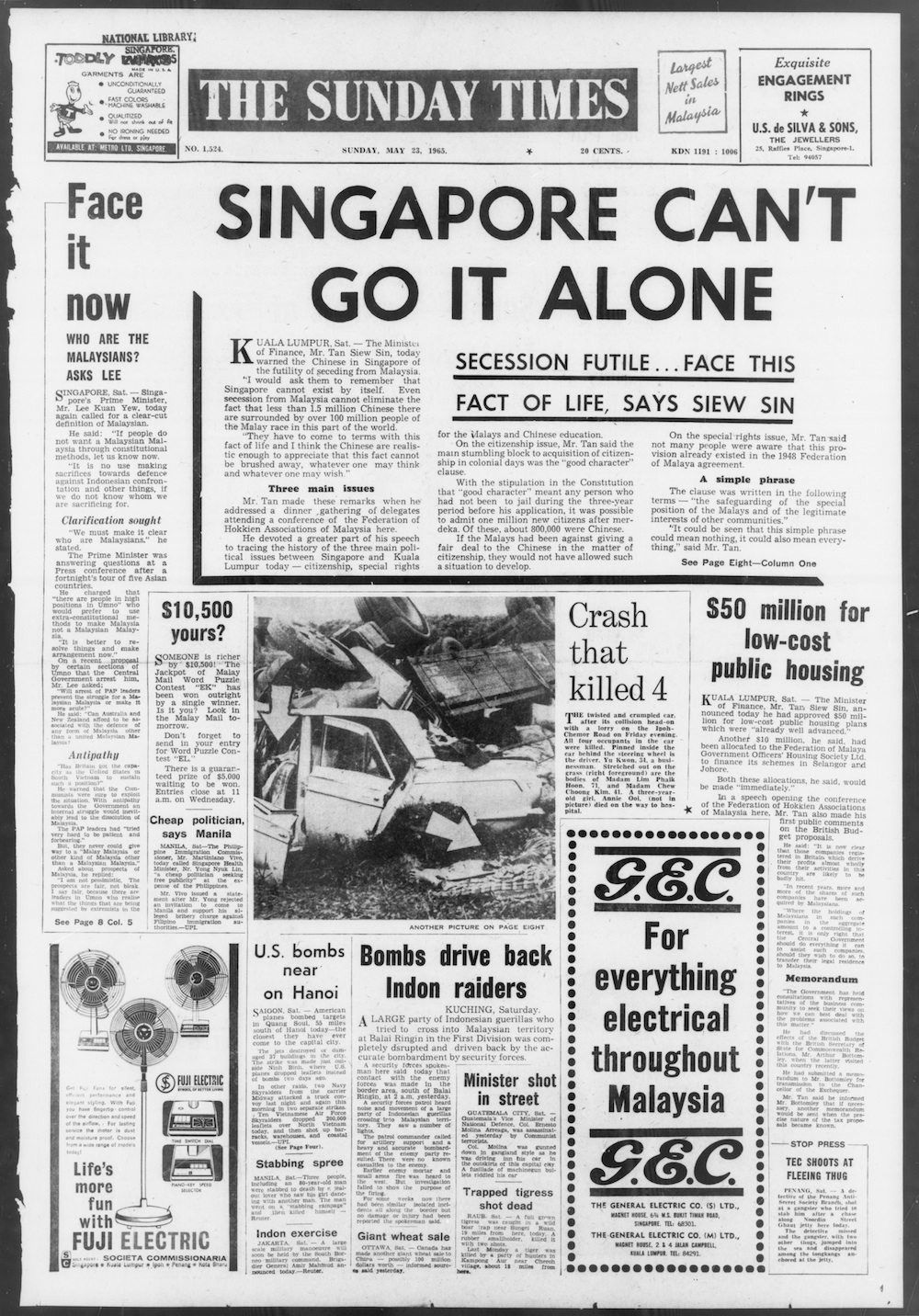
"Singapore cannot go it alone" reads the front-page headline of The Sunday Times on 23 May 1965. Tan Siew Sin had expressed scepticism about Singapore's ability to survive independently, dismissing the notion of separation.

The Singapore state government and the Malaysian federal government came into conflict over key economic matters. Under the terms of the Malaysia Agreement, Singapore undertook to contribute 40 percent of its total revenue to the federal government and to extend largely interest-free loans to Sabah and Sarawak, in return for the establishment of a common market. However, in July 1965, the Malaysian Finance Minister Tan Siew Sin proposed increasing this contribution to 60 percent and insinuated that unless Singapore acceded to the higher payment, progress on the common market would be deliberately delayed. This proposal was firmly rejected by Singapore's Finance Minister, Goh Keng Swee, who criticised the federal authorities for failing to uphold their end of the agreement and for imposing tariffs on Singaporean goods in breach of the common market spirit. The two parties also clashed over the disbursement of the loans, ultimately agreeing to submit the matter to the World Bank for arbitration.

=== Political disagreements ===
The Malaysian federal government, led predominantly by the United Malays National Organisation (UMNO), was increasingly apprehensive that Singapore's continued presence within the Federation would jeopardise the implementation of the Malay supremacist bumiputera policy. This policy of affirmative action, favouring the Malays, was central to UMNO's agenda of "redressing socio-economic imbalances" between the ethnic groups. However, this position was fundamentally at odds with the People's Action Party's (PAP) persistent call for a "Malaysian Malaysia", the principle that all Malaysian citizens ought to be treated equally by the state, irrespective of racial or economic background. Additionally, there was growing concern within the federal leadership that Singapore's economic strength, centred on the Port of Singapore, would in time eclipse that of Kuala Lumpur, thereby shifting both economic and political influence southwards.

=== Racial tensions ===
Racial tensions also escalated sharply within a year of merger. Although the federal government had granted citizenship to large numbers of ethnic Chinese living in Malaya following independence, many Chinese had expressed discontent with the government's policies of affirmative action, particularly those enshrined in Article 153 of the Constitution of Malaysia, which conferred special privileges upon the Malays. These included preferential access to education, employment and business opportunities among other factors, while Islam was recognised as the sole official religion of the Federation. Although freedom of religion was officially maintained for non-Muslims, the perception among the Chinese was that such policies was institutional racism. At the same time, Malay Singaporeans and Muslims were being stirred by Kuala Lumpur's persistent accusations that the PAP was "marginalising" the Malay community in Singapore, further inflaming communal sensitivities.

Tensions culminated in a series of racial disturbances collectively known as the 1964 race riots, with the most severe outbreak taking place on 21 July. The violence was precipitated by a speech on 12 July by UMNO politician Syed Jaafar Albar, delivered at the New Star Cinema in Pasir Panjang, in which he accused Lee Kuan Yew of "oppressing the Malays" and claimed their conditions were "worse than under the Japanese occupation". Declaring before a crowd of thousands that "if there is unity, no force in this world can trample us down... Not one Lee Kuan Yew, a thousand Lee Kuan Yew... we finish them off," he received vociferous support, with chants calling for the arrest of Lee and Othman Wok, the latter deemed as a "race traitor" to the Malays. The inflammatory rhetoric was followed by an incendiary article in the Utusan Melayu on 20 July. The following day, racial violence broke out during the Mawlid procession near Kallang Gasworks. By the end of the first day, 4 were dead and 178 injured; ultimately 23 lives were lost and 454 injured.

Additional unrest followed in September. Food prices surged due to the breakdown of the transportation network, compounding hardship among the population. Meanwhile, the regional climate deteriorated further as Indonesia under President Sukarno was engaging in the Konfrontasi, targeting Malaysia with military incursions and subversive actions, including the MacDonald House bombing in Singapore which killed three people back in March. The Indonesian campaign also included efforts to inflame Malay sentiment against the Chinese in Singapore throughout this period.

=== Proposed confederation ===
In early 1965, there was consideration of an alternative constitutional arrangement in the form of a looser confederation. Under this proposal, Singapore would return to the level of self-governance it had exercised from 1959 to 1963, while remaining within a wider Malaysian framework. In such a configuration, the federal government in Kuala Lumpur would oversee defence and external affairs, reflecting the former role of the British colonial authorities. Matters of internal security would be managed cooperatively through an Internal Security Council. A contentious aspect of this proposal was that while Singapore's tax revenues would be channelled to the federal treasury, it would be excluded from representation in the Malaysian Parliament. This arrangement drew sharp criticism, particularly from Lee Kuan Yew, who objected to the idea that Singapore should be subject to federal taxation without parliamentary representation, declaring to Tunku Abdul Rahman that "Singapore cannot become a colony in Malaysia". The United Kingdom also disapproved of the proposal, concerned that such a fragmented structure might compromise regional stability, especially amid heightened tensions brought about by the Konfrontasi with Indonesia.

== Separation ==
=== Albatross file ===
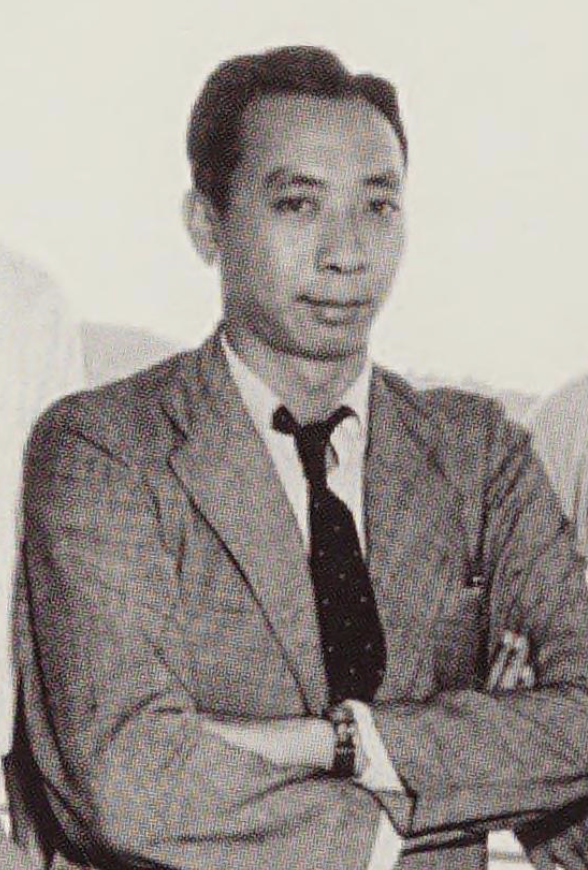
Goh Keng Swee believed that it was ultimately in the best interests of both Singapore and Malaysia to part ways and pursue separate paths.

Although it has long been regarded as historical orthodoxy that Singapore was abruptly and unilaterally severed from Malaysia by the federal government, an open secret had persisted regarding the existence of classified materials known as the Albatross file, a reference to an interview from 1996 in which Goh Keng Swee described merger with Malaysia as an "Albatross around [their] necks", referencing the poem The Rime of the Ancient Mariner by Samuel Taylor Coleridge. These documents reveal that as early as 1964 and especially after the racial riots that July, confidential negotiations had commenced between the PAP and the Alliance Party. In a handwritten note, Lee Kuan Yew formally authorised Goh to engage in discussions with Abdul Razak Hussein and Ismail Abdul Rahman in early 1965, laying the groundwork for an eventual and orderly separation. Over the course of the year, both sides coordinated discreetly to ensure that when Tunku Abdul Rahman publicly announced Singapore's separation, the process would be presented as a fait accompli that could not be obstructed by popular resistance or pro-merger sentiment, which had remained significant at the time.

In July 1965, Lee instructed E. W. Barker to begin drafting the legal documents for Singapore's separation from Malaysia. He also enlisted the assistance of his wife, Kwa Geok Choo, a lawyer in her own right, to support this process. Upon reviewing and approving the drafts, Lee authorised Barker to transmit them to Abdul Razak, who was conducting negotiations with Goh. Throughout this period, Abdul Razak kept the Tunku apprised of the developments. The Tunku subsequently endorsed the drafts and gave his assent to the separation. The discussions between Malaysian and Singaporean leaders, along with the drafting of the separation documents, were carried out under strict secrecy, with Singapore's Deputy Prime Minister Toh Chin Chye and Minister of Culture S. Rajaratnam initially kept uninformed. When Lee summoned them to Kuala Lumpur on 7 August and presented the documents, just two days before the planned separation, both Toh and Rajaratnam were deeply distressed and initially refused to endorse the agreement. It was only after receiving a personal letter from Tunku, emphasising that Singapore's expulsion was final and that "there was absolutely no other way", that the two men signed. At the conclusion of the negotiations, Goh, Lee, Barker, Abdul Razak, Ismail and the Tunku all concurred that it would be in the best interests of both parties for Singapore and Malaysia to part on a "clean break" and pursue separate paths.

By this stage, the PAP had already consolidated its political position following the success of Operation Coldstore in 1963, which had effectively crippled the leftists and neutralised key figures such as Lim Chin Siong of the Barisan Sosialis (BS). Both Lee and Goh believed that separation would afford Singapore the "best of both worlds", which was political insulation from the racial and communal tensions that was plaguing Malaysia, while maintaining access to the Malaysian market for continued economic development. After the initial reveal in 1996, limited portions of the Albatross file were displayed at an exhibition by the National Museum of Singapore in 2015, offering the public a first glimpse into the high-level deliberations surrounding the separation. Almost six decades after the separation in 2023, the Singaporean government announced that the Albatross file would be fully declassified and released to the public.

=== Public narrative ===
The separation was carefully presented to the public in a manner designed to minimise instability and avert the risk of escalating racial tensions. On 7 August, the separation agreement was signed, and the Tunku rejected Lee's final proposal for a looser federation, stating that "There's no other way now". On 9 August, Parliament voted unanimously, 126 to 0, in favour of the separation by passing the Constitution and Malaysia (Singapore Amendment) Act 1965, with Members of Parliament from Singapore notably absent. On that same day, a visibly emotional Lee at a press conference in Caldecott Hill publicly announced that Singapore was henceforth a sovereign and independent state, assuming the position of Prime Minister of the newly formed nation. During the conference, later televised that day, he remarked: "I mean for me it is a moment of anguish because all my life… you see the whole of my adult life… I have believed in merger and the unity of these two territories. You know it's a people connected by geography, economics, and ties of kinship…" A 2015 poll among Singaporeans showed that Lee's "moment of anguish" was one of the most enduring memories in Singapore's modern history.

== After separation ==
=== Reactions from Singaporeans ===
Official government speeches, newspapers and textbooks often state that Singaporeans were apprehensive and uncertain about separation, viewing it as a collective traumatic event. Retrospective accounts present a more nuanced picture, particularly regarding the majority Chinese community. Many businesses were upbeat about the prospect of restoring trade, particularly with Indonesia and China. (Note: Unofficially, as Singapore continued to recognise the Republic of China (ROC) based in Taiwan as the representative of China until 1990. See also: China–Singapore relations and Singapore–Taiwan relations.) The removal of high federal taxes was also seen as a positive change. Furthermore, the stock market in Singapore rallied almost immediately after independence was declared, with a surge in trading volume and a wave of optimism among investors. In his memoirs, Lee admitted that while he felt crushed and distraught, "there was rejoicing in Chinatown." Some even celebrated the separation, setting off firecrackers and local clan associations offering to sponsor celebrations to mark Singapore's independence from Malaysia. An alternative media outlet, RICE Media, also interviewed seniors in 2022 who remembered that there were generally little concern about separation as many Singaporeans were politically apathetic.

Nonetheless, reports show that the Malay community did feel some anguish about the separation. An American intelligence report observed that the Malay populace "was somewhat deflated". Zainul Abidin Rasheed, an ethnic Malay who was a former PAP politician and diplomat, recalled that the "Malays [in Singapore] were very unhappy, very sad and very suspicious" about separation. However, there was no mass unrest or exodus among the Malays. In fact, following separation, the Tunku offered any Malay Singaporeans who wished to relocate to Malaysia 10 acres (4.0 ha) of land in the neighbouring state of Johor. The offer was not taken up and the overwhelming majority of local Malays chose to remain and pledged their loyalty to the new nation. Lee also met a range of Malay community leaders to address their concerns and to calm any tensions that followed the separation from Malaysia. He was often accompanied by Othman Wok, who helped to reassure the Malay community. Meanwhile, the Indian and Eurasian communities reacted with neutrality or quiet support, and broadly accepted the emergence of the new independent state.

=== Reactions from other constituent states ===
Singapore's separation provoked particular ire among political leaders in Sabah and Sarawak, the Federation's other nation-building partners who also joined in 1963. They expressed deep dissatisfaction at having been excluded from consultations by both the Malaysian federal government and the Singaporean state government. Among them, Chief Minister of Sabah Fuad Stephens, then known as Donald Stephens, conveyed his distress in a letter to Lee, writing: "I feel like Death. Tears, heartbreak and completely lost and betrayed. Never in my wildest dreams did I see this happening." In the Dewan Rakyat, the lower house of Parliament, Ong Kee Hui, chairman of the Sarawak United Peoples' Party (SUPP), questioned the very justification for Malaysia's continued existence following Singapore's departure, emphasising that the Malaysia Agreement had been negotiated by all founding parties. Responding to such concerns, Abdul Razak addressed the University of Malaya Graduates Society at the Arts Lecture Theatre in Pantai Valley, Kuala Lumpur, on 1 September 1965. He denied allegations of exclusion and explained that the decision had been made and announced in secrecy owing to the sensitivities of the Konfrontasi.

=== Change of organs ===
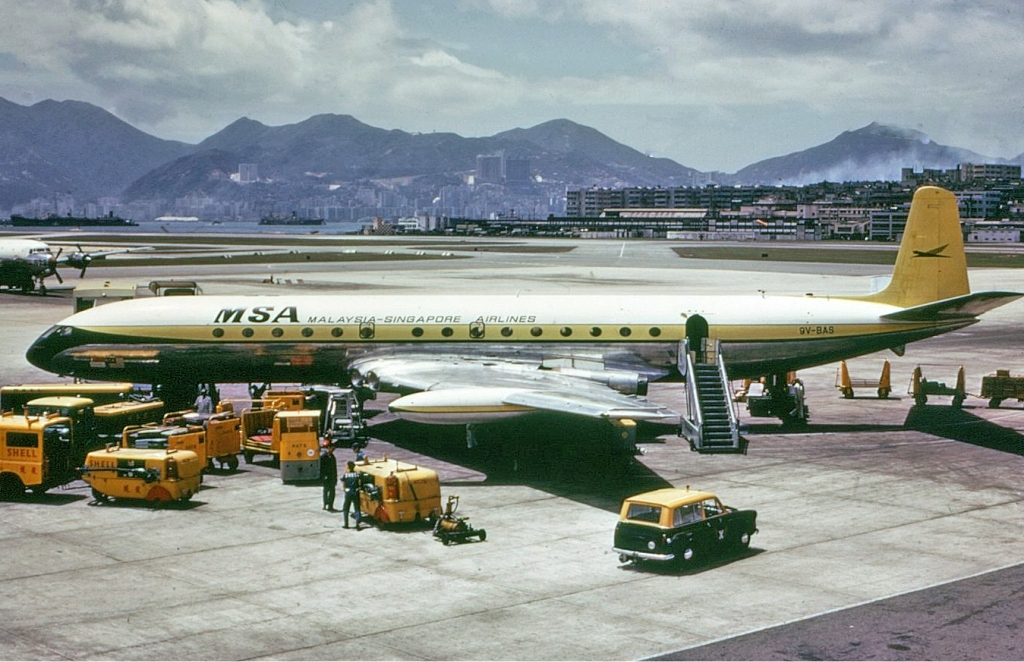
Malaysia and Singapore shared a national airline for a few years after separation.

Under constitutional amendments to the Constitution of Singapore enacted in December 1965, the newly independent state was formally designated the Republic of Singapore. The vice-regal representative, or Yang di-Pertuan Negara, Yusof Ishak, was appointed as Singapore's first President, and the Legislative Assembly was transformed into the Parliament of Singapore. These constitutional changes were made retroactive to the date of Singapore's separation from Malaysia. The Malaya and British Borneo dollar continued as legal tender until the introduction of the Singapore dollar in 1967. Prior to the currency split, discussions had taken place between the Malaysian and Singaporean governments regarding the possibility of a common currency.

Both the Bruneian, Malaysian and Singaporean currencies were maintained at par under the Currency Interchangeability Agreement, though Malaysia withdrew from this arrangement in 1973; Brunei and Singapore maintain their currency interchangeability at par to this day. Malaysia's withdrawal also led to the split of the Stock Exchange of Malaysia and Singapore (SEMS) that year, which today makes up both the Singapore Exchange (SGX) and the Bursa Malaysia respectively. Meanwhile, Singapore ceased to be represented in the Malaysian Parliament, and the High Court of Singapore briefly remained subordinate to the Federal Court of Malaysia until its full judicial independence was attained in 1969. Both Malaysia and Singapore continued to share a national airline for several years after separation, known as Malaysia–Singapore Airlines, before ultimately also going their separate ways in 1972 with the creation of Malaysia Airlines and Singapore Airlines due to divergent operational priorities between the two governments.

== See also ==
- History of Malaysia
- Proclamation of Malaysia
- PAP-UMNO relations
- History of the Republic of Singapore
- Constitution and Malaysia (Singapore Amendment) Act 1965
- Independence of Singapore Agreement 1965
- Proclamation of Singapore
