= Anglo–Malayan Defence Agreement =

1957 treaty between the United Kingdom and Malaya

The Anglo-Malayan Defence Agreement (AMDA) was set up on 19 September 1957 to provide a security umbrella for the newly independent Malaya. AMDA was a bilateral defence agreement between the United Kingdom and the Federation of Malaya, which also committed Australia and New Zealand to assist Britain in the defence of Malaysia. This agreement was used to justify Australian and New Zealand involvement in the Malayan Emergency and the Indonesian-Malaysian Confrontation. The agreement was formally signed by the British and Malayan Governments on 12 October 1957.

When Malaysia was created in 1963, AMDA was renamed the Anglo-Malaysian Defence Agreement and continued to provide some measure of security to the new federation. During Singapore's separation from Malaysia in 1965, specific provisions were put in place in the Constitution and Malaysia (Singapore Amendment) Act 1965 to guarantee the United Kingdom could continue to use bases and facilities based in Singapore.

AMDA was later replaced with the FPDA in 1971.
