= The Straits Times =

Singaporean daily broadsheet newspaper

- The Straits Times front page on 20 January 2026
- Type: Daily newspaper
- Format: Broadsheet; Online
- Owner: SPH Media
- Editor: Jaime Ho
- Founded: 15 July 1845; 181 years ago (as The Straits Times and Singapore Journal of Commerce) (66,228 issues)
- Language: English
- Headquarters: 1000 Toa Payoh North, News Centre, Singapore, 318994
- Country: Singapore
- Circulation: 995,991 (As of August 2018)
- ISSN: 0585-3923
- OCLC number: 8572659
- Website: straitstimes.com

The Straits Times (also known informally by its abbreviation ST) is a Singaporean daily English-language newspaper owned by the SPH Media Trust. Established on 15 July 1845, it is the most-widely circulated newspaper in the country and has a significant regional audience. The newspaper is published in both broadsheet and online formats, the latter of which was launched in 1994. It is regarded as the newspaper of record for Singapore.

The newspaper has been generally perceived as having a close relationship with the Singaporean government and toeing the party line of the governing People's Action Party (PAP).

== History ==
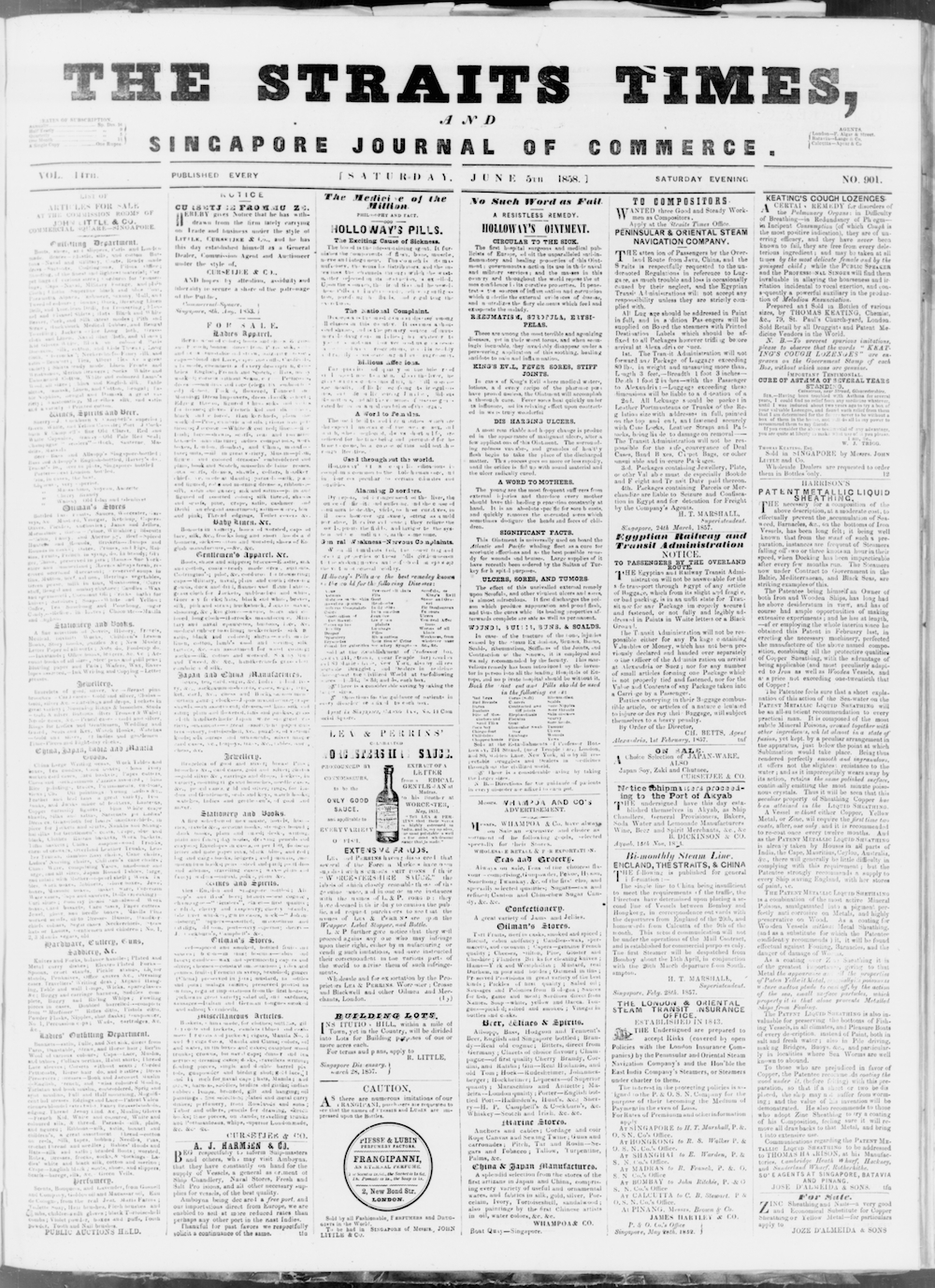
The Straits Times and Singapore Journal of Commerce on 5 June 1858

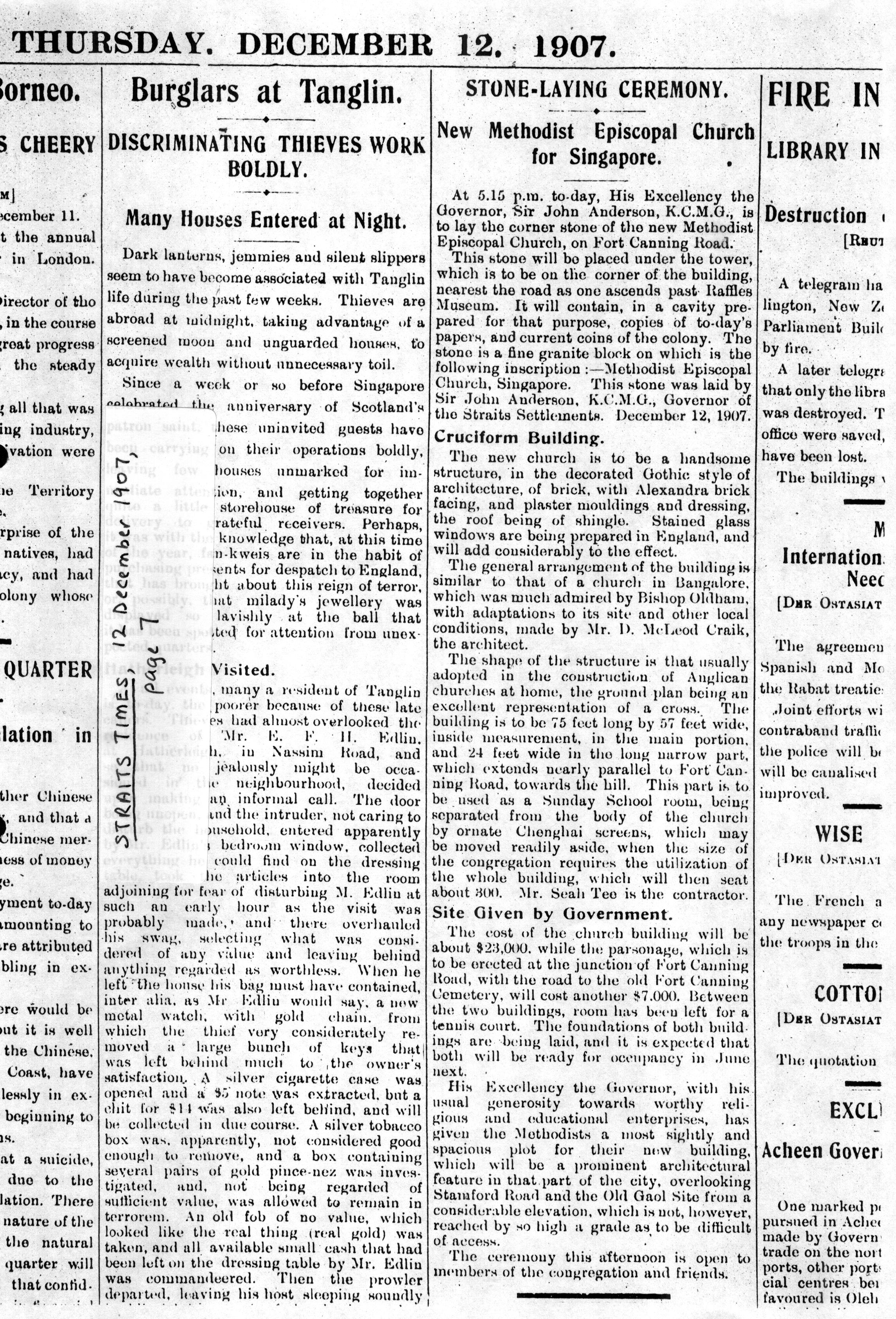
Page 7 in The Straits Times on 12 December 1907 entitled "Stone-Laying Ceremony: New Methodist Episcopal Church for Singapore", about the construction of Wesley Methodist Church at Fort Canning Hill

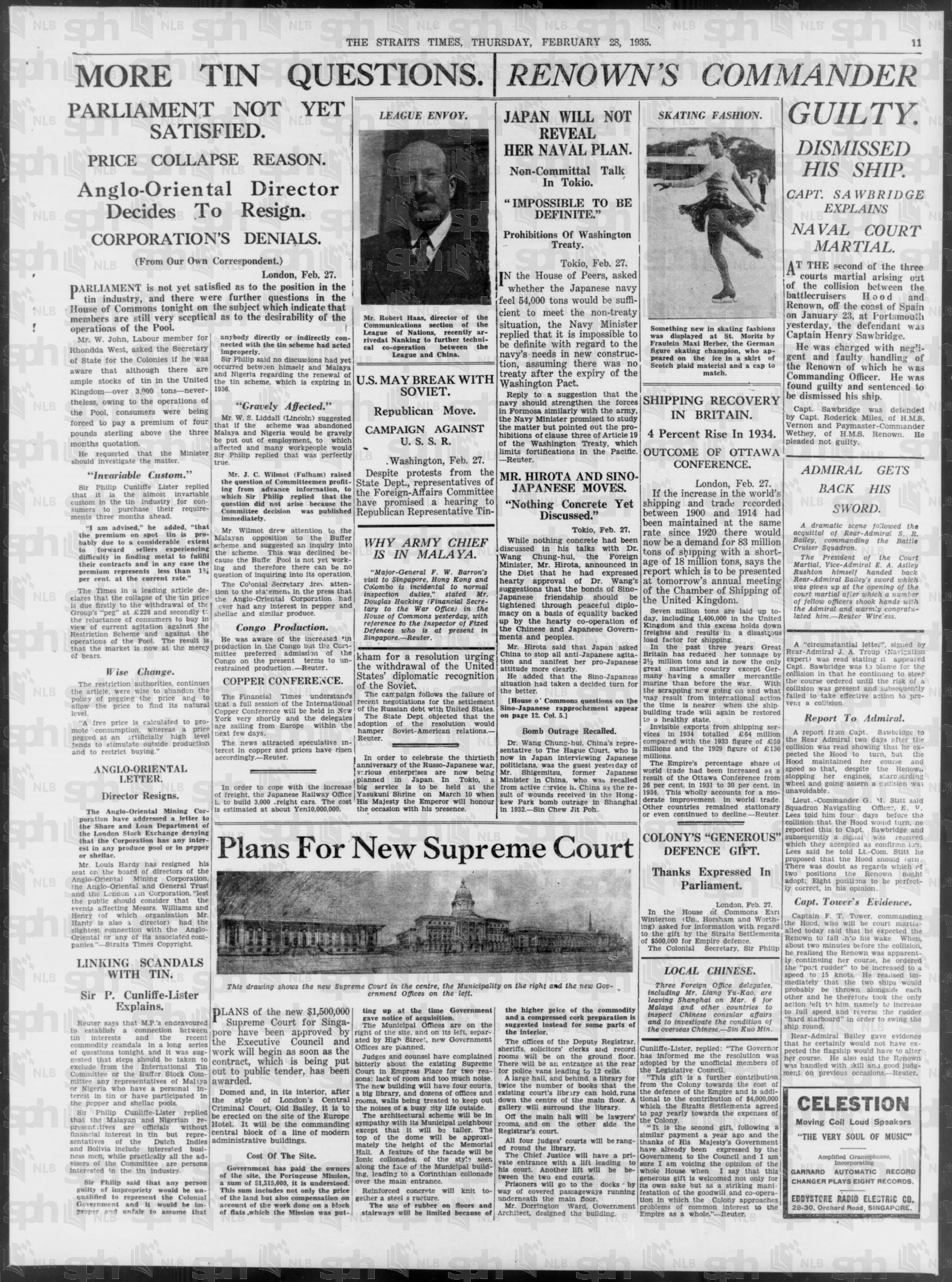
Page 11 in The Straits Times on 28 February 1935. The "Plans for a new Supreme Court" report would lead to the construction of the contemporary Old Supreme Court Building, completed on 3 August 1939. The building was used in its official capacity until 20 June 2005, by which it was converted to a national museum named the National Gallery Singapore.

=== Early years ===
The original conception for The Straits Times has been debated by historians of Singapore. Prior to 1845, the only English-language newspaper in Singapore was The Singapore Free Press, founded by William Napier in 1835. Marterus Thaddeus Apcar, an Armenian merchant, had intended to start a paper, hired an editor, and purchased printing equipment from England. However the would-be editor died abruptly, prior to the arrival of the printing equipment, and Apcar went bankrupt. Fellow Armenian and friend, Catchick Moses, then bought the printing equipment from Apcar and launched The Straits Times with Robert Carr Woods Sr., an English journalist from Bombay as editor. The paper was founded as The Straits Times and Singapore Journal of Commerce on 15 July 1845.

The Straits Times was launched as an eight-page weekly, published at 7 Commercial Square using a hand-operated press. The subscription fee then was Sp.$1.75 per month. As editor, Woods sought to distinguish The Straits Times from The Singapore Free Press by including humour, short stories, and foreign news, and by making use of regular steamship services carrying mail that launched shortly before The Straits Times was launched. Historian Mary Turnbull disputes this account of The Straits Times' founding, saying that it was unlikely an Armenian merchant would have wanted to found an English-language newspaper, particularly given the presence of the more established Singapore Free Press. In September 1846, the paper was given to Woods outright because the press proved unprofitable to run and Moses was unable to sell it. The paper struggled with a lack of subscribers and newsworthy items to coverage. Woods covered the financial deficit by using the printing press for other projects, including the first directory of Singapore, The Straits Times Almanack, Calendar and Directory, published in 1846.

The first major political stance taken by The Straits Times was against James Brooke, the Rajah of Sarawak. Woods personally resented Brooke and charged that Brooke's action against Dayak "pirates" was a massacre of peaceful, civilian merchants. The rival Singapore Free Press came to Brooke's defence and the ensuing controversy boosted the circulation of both papers. Woods petitioned the British government for an inquest of Brooke's actions in 1851, with a commission convened in 1854. Brookes was exonerated, but the popularity of the episode made The Straits Times a success, and it became a daily newspaper in 1858.

Woods continued as editor of the paper until he sold it in 1860. John Cameron served as editor from 1861 to 1869, during which the paper nearly went out of business due to a hugely destructive fire. The paper's assets were sold at public auction for $40 and Cameron went bankrupt, although he managed to revive the newspaper. Six years after Cameron's death in 1881, his widow appointed Arnot Reid, a young Scottish journalist, as editor, who then held the post for 12 years.

The Straits Times became a major reporter of political and economic events of note in British Malaya, including shipping news, civil and political unrest in Siam and Burma, official reports, and including high society news items such as tea parties held at Government House and visits from dignitaries such as the Sultan of Johor. Colonial officials, such as Frank Swettenham, wrote articles, sometimes in their own names. The paper later published Swettenham's writings on the history of Perak and his involvement in the British Residential system in 1893.

Following Reid's retirement, Alexander W. Still took over as editor, a post he held for 18 years. During Still's leadership as editor, The Straits Times built a reputation for bold reporting and fearless commentary. It was known as the "Thunderer of the East", a reference to the original Thunderer, The Times of London, and was a critic of the British colonial administration, though much milder in its criticism of the government compared to its critique of unethical businesses. Under Still's leadership, circulation (from 3,600 in 1910 to 4,100 in 1920) and ad revenues increased. Still's outspokenness as editor resulted in a number of libel suits against the paper, which were either lost or settled privately out of court. He believed that the paper had an obligation to investigate and expose corruption both in government and in business.

For our own part, we cherish the liberty of the press simply for its value to the community as a whole. Nothing fills us with greater contempt than the type of journalism, unfortunately somewhat on the increase in Great Britain, which pries into private affairs, gloats over domestic scandals, and tickles the palates of the people with snappy tidbits of personality. We do not want liberty of the press extended in a form that would enable this kind of journalism to pander without fear of penalties. But in the modern constitution of society, the press has great functions to perform. It is the chief safeguard against corruption . . . our business is to do what we deem right and necessary in the public interest, and no law court can be the keeper of our conscience . . . Malaya has some reason to be proud of its press. It is honest, clean, and public-spirited. It may be wrong-headed occasionally - we may ourselves be the chief of sinners in that respect - but it puts no man or woman to the blush, and its aims are generally wholesome.

Still attacked the actions of governor Laurence Guillemard on the grounds of a free press, such as back-room discussions of a proposed constitutional change that colonial administrators urged reporters to delay covering until the proposals were announced. In an editorial, Still replied, "That is mere pompous nonsense when addressed to a free people and a free press."

The Singapore Free Press, which had folded in 1869, was revived by W.G. St. Clair, who edited it until 1916. The rival newspapers spurred readership among the growing English-reading community, with The Singapore Free Press published in the morning and The Straits Times released in the afternoon. Still retired from The Straits Times in 1926 and the paper cycled through four editors in the span of two years before George Seabridge became editor in 1928. He held the position for the next 18 years and oversaw huge growth in circulation: from 5,000 to 25,000 subscribers.

The Straits Times focused predominantly on British and British-related events while ignoring the politics and socio-economic issues of concern to other groups, including the Malay, Chinese, and Indian populations in and around Singapore. Coverage of events related to non-British was typically restricted to court cases or sensationalised crimes, such as the Tok Janggut's rebellion in Kelantan in 1915. Under Still's editorship, the paper called for better working conditions for Malay, Chinese, and Indian labourers, but on the grounds that it would improve their efficiency and productivity. Still also considered the Asian population of Singapore "untrustworthy" and suggested they should not hold positions of power or serve in the military. Asian reporters at The Straits Times experienced discrimination in the workplace and while on assignment. Peter Benson Maxwell, an Indian reporter, arranged an interview with the governor Cecil Clementi via Clementi's secretary, but was quickly removed from the premises of the Government House when he arrived in person.

The paper was originally owned by the individual founders before becoming a private company, as it remained until 1950. Its single largest shareholder was the procurer of the Paris Foreign Missions Society, the Reverend N.J. Couvreur, who also served as the chairman of the company's board of the directors from 1910 to 1920.

=== Prewar period ===
In the 1920s and 1930s, The Straits Times began to face competition from other papers, specifically The Malaya Tribune, which promised "frank discussion of Malayan affairs" and "weekly articles by special and well-informed writers, Chinese, Indians, and Muslims". The Tribune, founded in 1914, lagged behind The Straits Times in sales and readership, and launched an advertising campaign to increase circulation and move the paper away from its image as the "clerk's paper". It also hired talented journalists, including Leslie Hoffman and T.S. Khoo, who became the editor-in-chief and deputy editor-in-chief, respectively, of The Straits Times after World War II. The efforts of the Malaya Tribune were successful when, in 1932, its circulation exceeded that of The Straits Times. In response to the competition, Seabridge improved the company by building a new office, replacing and updating old printing equipment, hiring local journalists, and beginning delivery upcountry. He also made significant changes to the paper: he expanded coverage of events in Singapore and Malaya; created a Sunday paper; cut the price of the paper to match that of the Malaya Tribune; and incorporated pictures, comics, and other eye-catching elements to make the paper more attractive. Particularly with the reduction of cost, the number of subscribers dramatically increased. In 1938, the paper began delivery by air to Kuala Lumpur, where they were taken from the city to rural areas by vans.

Part of Seabridge's attempts to expand circulation was to include "women's columns", particularly by incorporating the voices of the wives of wealthy British planters.

By 1933, the renewed Free Press was unable to maintain the competition with The Straits Times and the paper was bought by Seabridge, though it remained more closely affiliated with merchants and lawyers.

=== Japanese occupation ===
==== Lead-up to occupation ====
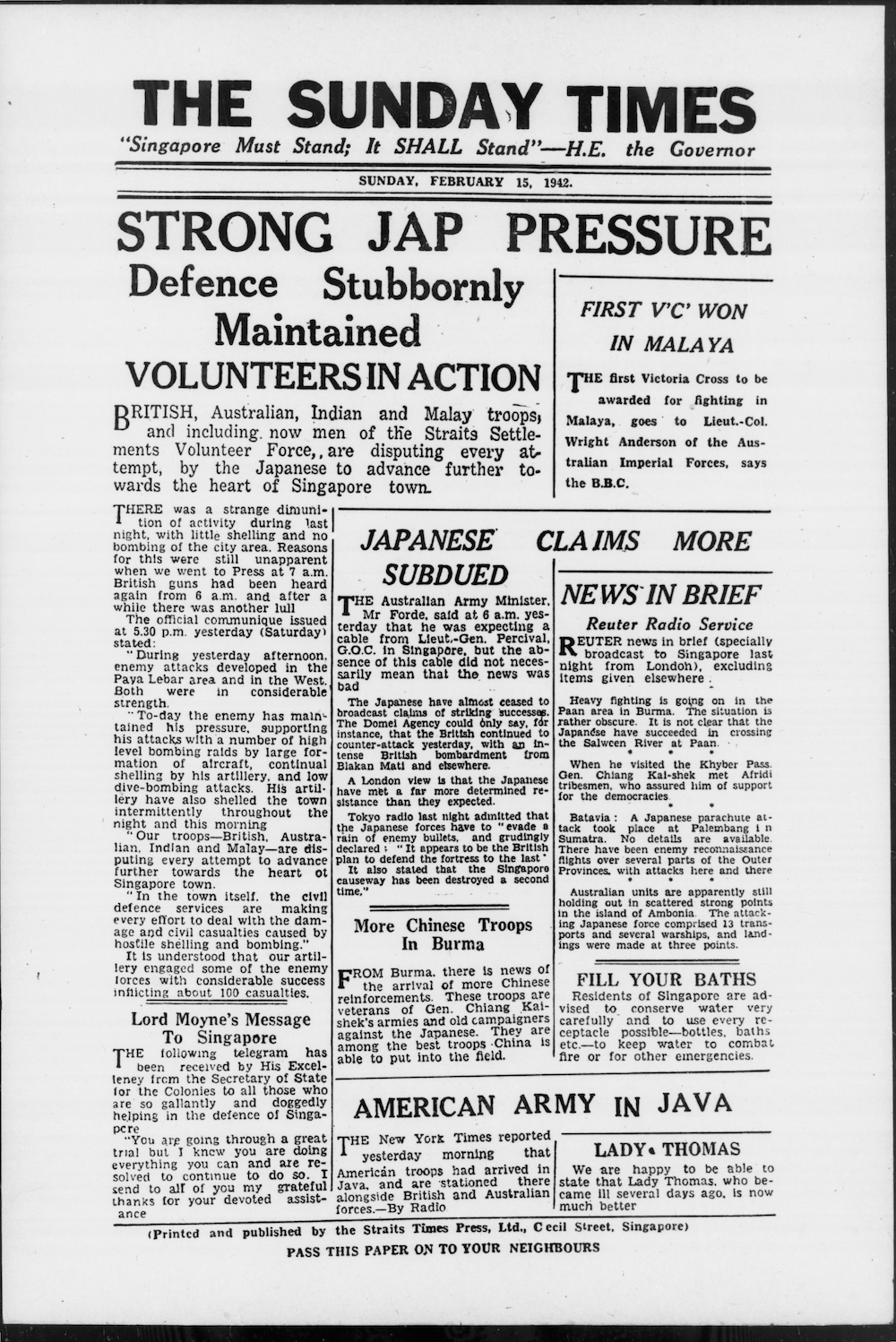
The Sunday Times edition on 15 February 1942. Lieutenant-General Arthur Percival surrendered on behalf of the Commonwealth forces later that day, leading to the largest surrender of British forces in history.

In July 1941, Prime Minister Winston Churchill appointed Duff Cooper, a former Minister of Information, to investigate how to coordinate defence policy planning in Asia against the threat of Japanese invasion. Cooper arrived in Singapore in September 1941 and reported that the various civil, governmental, and military elements did not communicate or coordinate well. Seabridge, as chief editor of The Straits Times, was highly critical of the lack of planning and efficiency of government officials. Seabridge and F. D. Bisseker, the chairman of the Eastern Smelting Company, strongly urged Cooper to build up civil defence; Seabridge also backed Cooper's proposal to institute martial law. Japanese attacks in the northern Malay states began on 8 December 1941, the day after the attack on Pearl Harbor. Five days later, the commander ordered the evacuation of all European women and children and all military personnel from the island of Penang. Similar evacuations of only Europeans were ordered throughout the month of December, seriously undermining the morale of the much larger Asian population of Singapore and the surrounding British areas. Governor Shenton Thomas insisted that the British community of Singapore not flee in the face of the Japanese, that no racial discrimination was to take place in the evacuation of civilians, and that British civil officers stay behind to "look after their Asian charges".

The government obstructed information of the severity of the situation on the frontlines. On 5 January 1941, The Straits Times published the following lead article summarising the situation.

Malaya has now been in the front line for a month. The Northern Settlement is in enemy hands, and fighting is taking place within 200 miles of Singapore. This island has been bombed on several occasions with 'slight damage to civilian property' and 'a few civilian casualties'. That is a reasonably accurate summary of all the people of this country have been told of the fighting that is going around them. Vague 'lines' have been mentioned and there have been sundry 'strategic withdrawals'. Such generalities provide a very flimsy basis indeed for detailed comment – so flimsy that we do not propose to attempt a task which is very nearly impossible of achievement ... The view we propose to put forward here is the view of the middle-class Asiatic who has been asked to help in maintaining morale but finds himself quite unable to do so ... If the newspapers and the newspaper reading public are to be any help in combatting rumour, they must be supplied with the only things which are of the slightest value in carrying out the task. And those things are facts.

==== Occupation ====
On 20 February 1942, five days after the Fall of Singapore, The Straits Times was renamed by Japan and became known as The Shonan Times, Shonan (昭南) being the Japanese name for Singapore. The first issue of The Shonan Times published a declaration by Tomoyuki Yamashita, announcing that the aim of the Japanese was to establish the Greater East Asia Co-Prosperity Sphere in order to achieve a "Great Spirit of Cosmocrasy" and "sweep away the arrogant and unrighteous British elements".

The children's newspaper, outlined in the third goal, was published as Sakura and included as a free supplement in the 10 June 1942 edition of the Syonan Shimbun, though it was later sold separately for one sen. In addition to the Sakura children's newspaper, the Syonan Shimbun, in all its iterations, was used by the Japanese government as a way of attempting to create pro-Japanese youth leaders among the multiethnic, multilingual children of Singapore.

The paper was later published as The Syonan Times, The Syonan Sinbun, and The Syonan Shimbun. The changes in the spelling arose from squabbles between adherents of different romanisation systems, namely Hepburn romanisation and a standard devised by the Japanese military government (i.e. General Tojo was written as Tozyo). On 8 December 1942, the anniversary of the initial Japanese invasion, the paper was published as the Syonan Sinbun, the English-language edition of a Japanese newspaper. It finally became the Syonan Shimbun on 8 December 1943.

During this period, the paper was thoroughly pro-Japanese and would often report on Japan's war efforts in the Pacific. The newspaper was run by members of the Japanese military propaganda division and included prominent writers such as Masuji Ibuse.

Seabridge and his wife fled Singapore on 11 February 1942 and went to Batavia (present-day Jakarta). From Batavia, Seabridge filed a secret report for the War Cabinet in London in April 1942 on the failure of both military and civilian governments to hold and maintain Singapore's defences.

Singapore itself was in a state of almost complete chaos from the end of December. Civil Servants who had evacuated from the Malay States sought to set up temporary departments in Singapore for no other apparent reason than the preservation of their jobs. Even the FMS Income Tax Department set itself up in Singapore after the last Federated State had fallen into Japanese hands. The Civil administration cracked badly and broke completely at some points. There was little co-operation with the Services, and many indications of jealousy and fear that outsiders might poach on the preserves of the Civil Servant … The extent to which obstructionists flourished was staggering.

==== As a war propaganda instrument ====
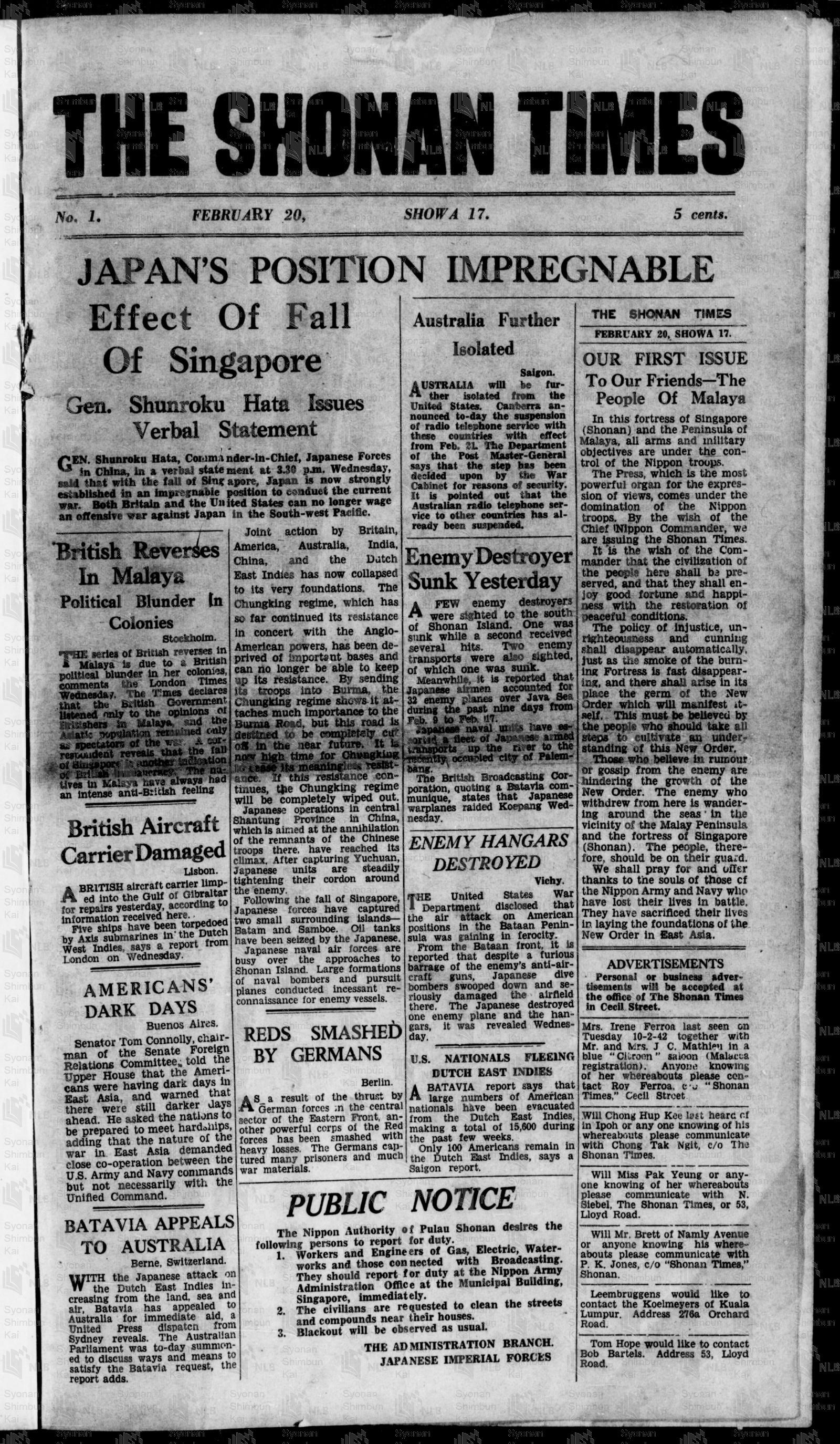
The first issue of The Shonan Times on 20 February 1942, five days after the Fall of Singapore

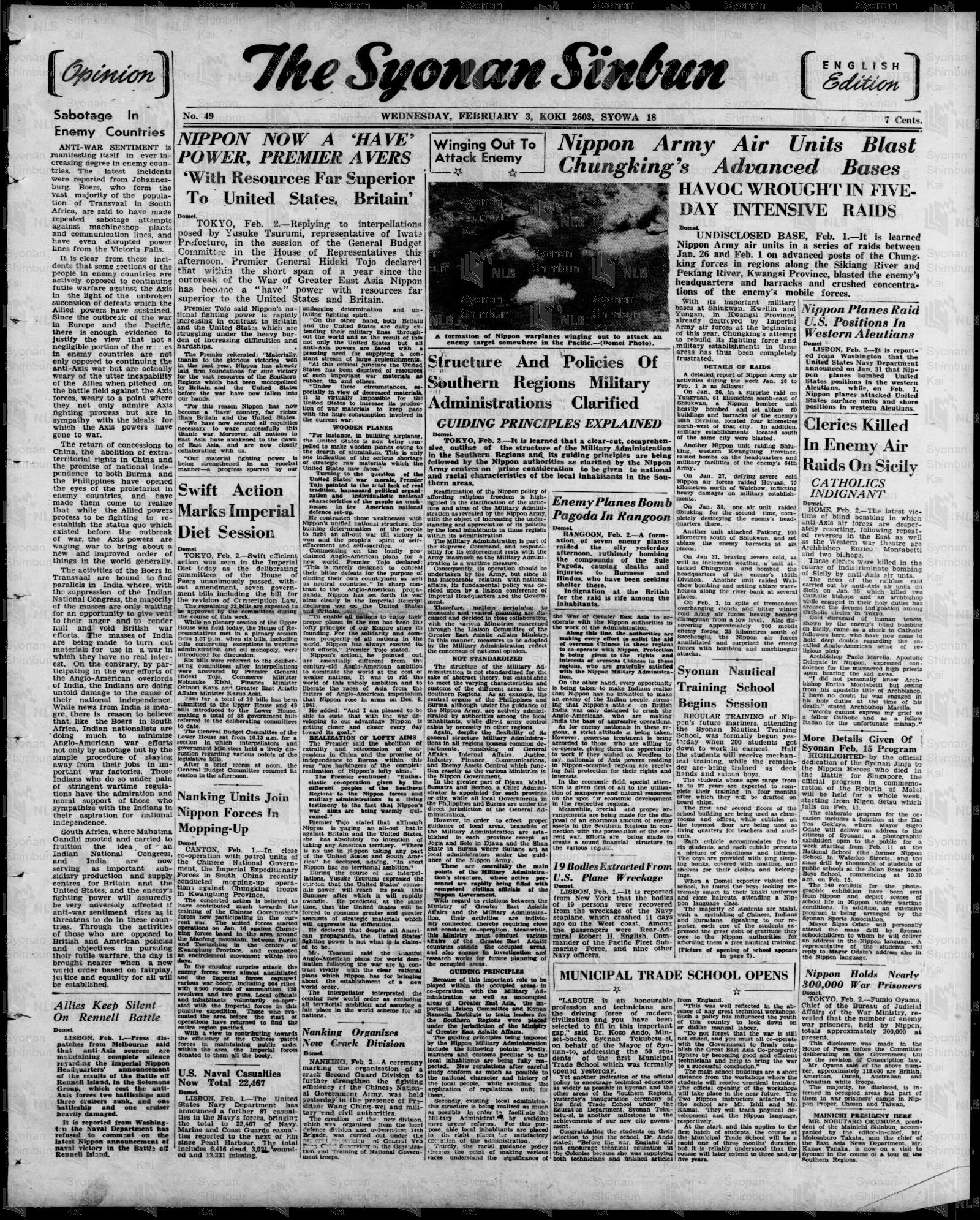
The newspaper as The Syonan Sinbun on 3 February 1943. The ongoing Pacific War dominates the news.

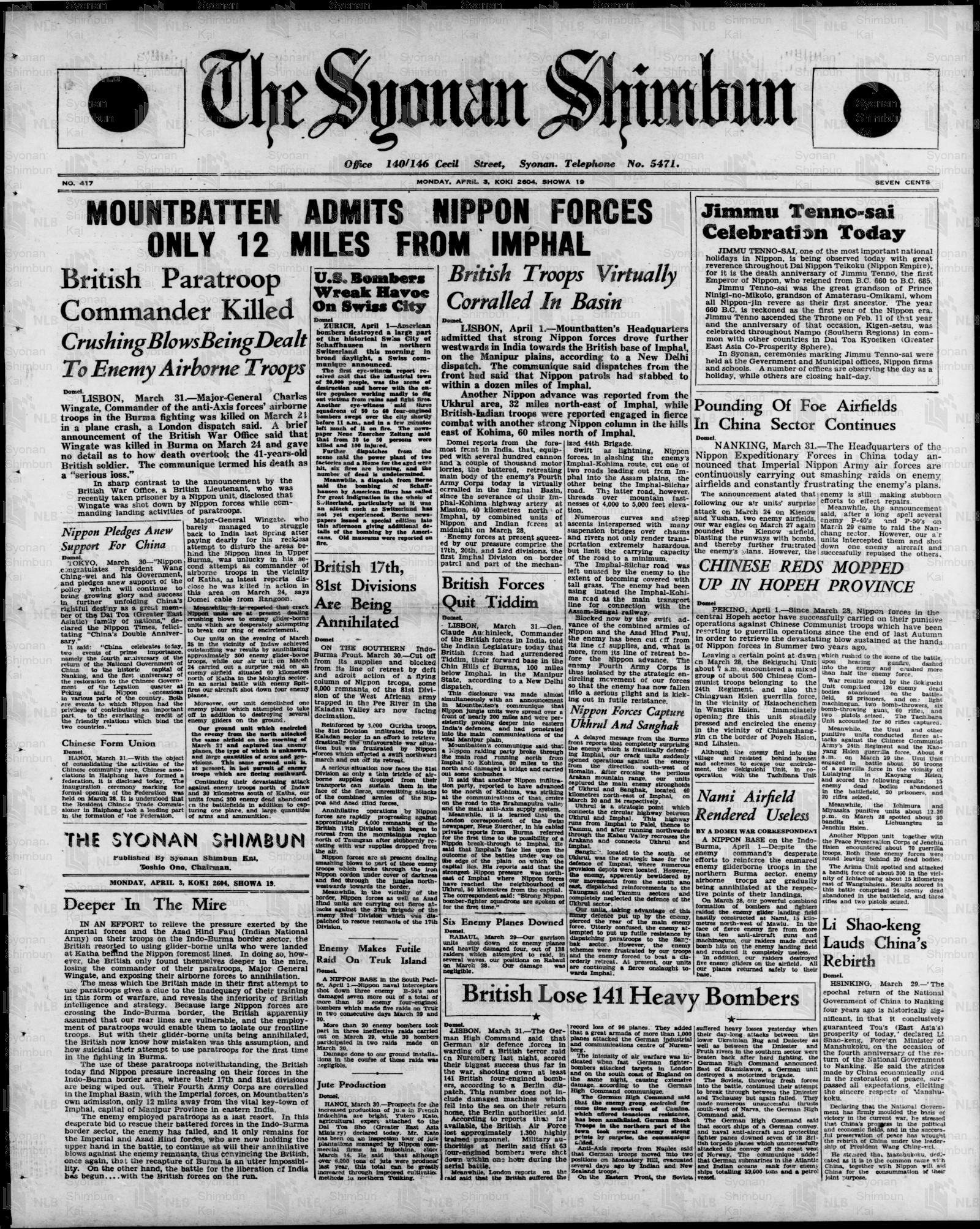
The newspaper as The Syonan Shimbun on 3 April 1944; two flags of Japan are prominently displayed due to the anniversary of the death of Emperor Jimmu.

In June 1942, the Military Propaganda Squad (軍宣伝班) launched a campaign, Nippon-Go Popularising Week, to promote the Japanese language among Singaporeans, using the Syonan Shimbun. The Propaganda Squad drafted some 150 members of the Japanese literati and assigned them to Singapore (Syonan) under the 25th Army Military Administration. These included notable authors such as the novelist Masuji Ibuse, poet Jimbo Kōtaro, and literary critic Nakajima Kenzo. A document dated 17 May 1942 outlined the four main objectives of Nippon-Go Popularising Week.

1. To promote the study of Japanese during and after Nippon-Go Popularising Week, introduce the Japanese state of affairs in a series of articles, and strengthen the command of conventional Japanese language in the local papers.
2. To entreat all Japanese soldiers involved in the constructive war effort to cooperate in teaching correct Japanese to natives.
3. To publish a weekly children's katakana newspaper.
4. To publish a guidebook on the proper pronunciation of Japanese syllables.

The children's newspaper, outlined in the third goal, was published as Sakura and included as a free supplement in the 10 June 1942 edition of the Syonan Shimbun, though it was later sold separately for one sen.

=== Post-war ===
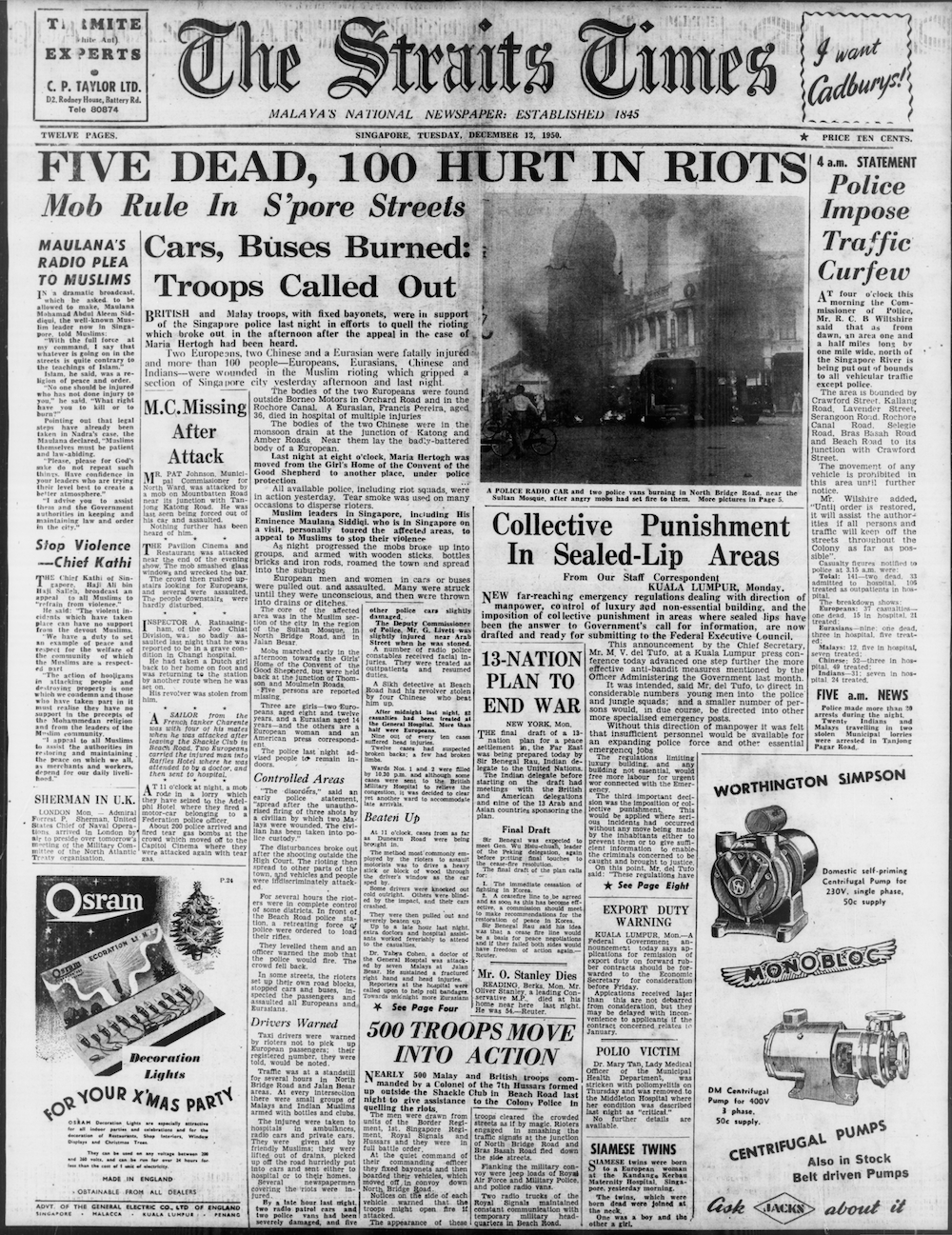
The newspaper on 12 December 1950, reporting the Maria Hertogh riots

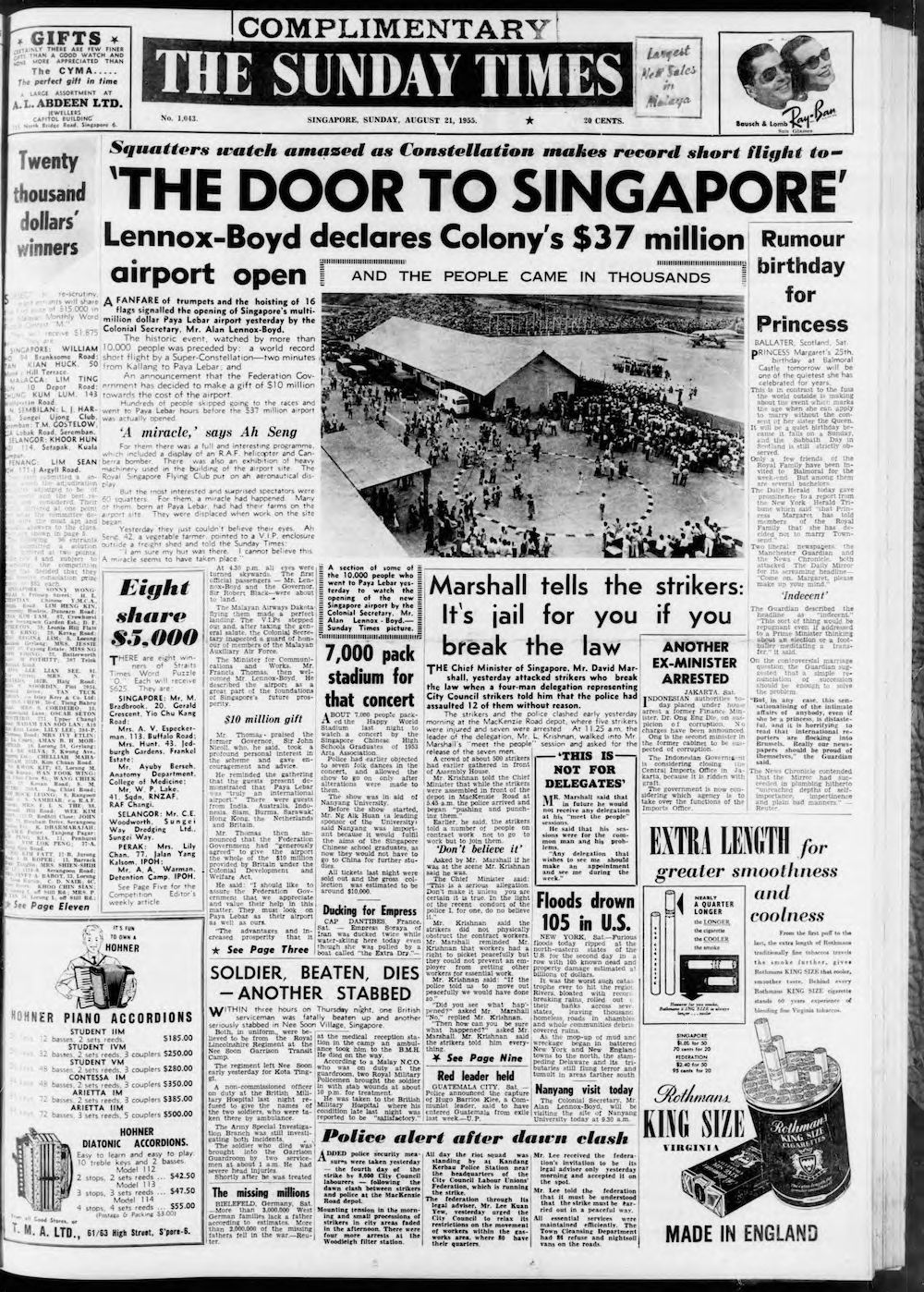
The Sunday Times edition on 21 August 1955, announcing the opening of Paya Lebar Airport and subsequently the closure of Kallang Airport

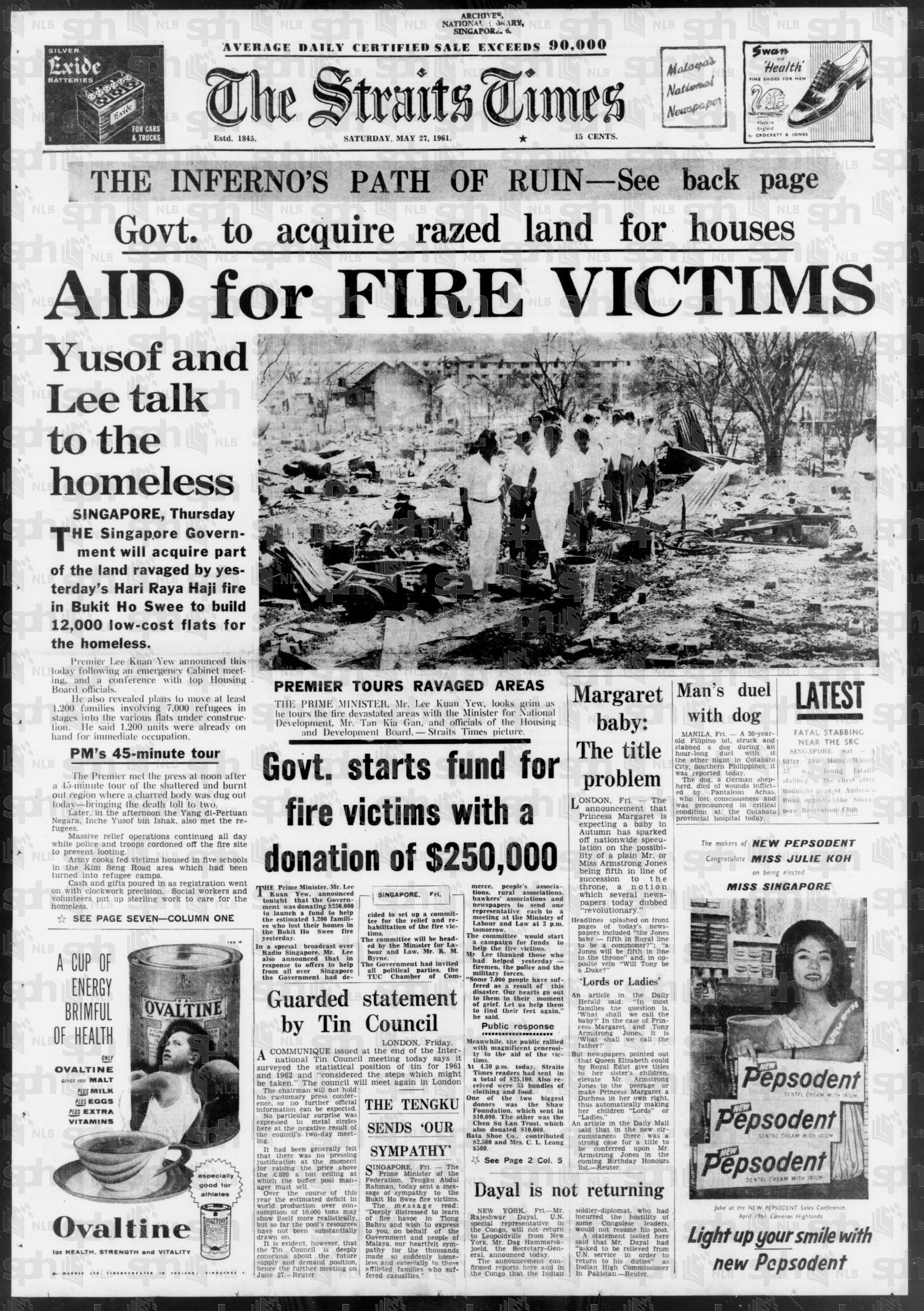
The newspaper on 27 May 1961, two days after the Bukit Ho Swee fire. The government's response would lead the way to the development of public housing throughout the country in decades to come.

The paper's name was reverted to The Straits Times on 5 September 1945 as Singapore returned to British colonial rule, and it has retained this name until today.

On 11 March 1950, The Straits Times became a public limited company.

In 1956, The Straits Times established a Malayan (now Malaysian) edition, the New Straits Times, based in Kuala Lumpur. Since the separation of the two countries, these newspapers have become unaffiliated with each other; in September 1972, the New Straits Times was disposed into Fleet Holdings, an investment arm of United Malays National Organisation (UMNO) which is headed by Junus Sudin. During the early days of Singaporean self-governance (before 1965), the paper, who had a pro-colonial stance, had an uneasy relationship with some politicians. This included the leaders of the People's Action Party (PAP), who desired self-governance for Singapore.

Editors were warned by British colonial officials that any reportage that may threaten the merger between Singapore and the Malayan Federation may result in subversion charges, and that they may be detained without trial under the Preservation of Public Security Ordinance Act.

During the Malayan Emergency, The Straits Times published cash bounties for information leading to the killing or capture of senior communists. Earlier during the Emergency, The Straits Times had erroneously reported that 26 suspected communist guerrillas had been shot dead by the British military while attempting to escape after ammunition had been discovered in their homes. It was later discovered that 24 people had been shot dead, and that all of them were innocent civilians who had been executed as part of the Batang Kali massacre by the Scots Guards regiment; an event described by historians as the British Mỹ Lai.

=== Post-independence ===
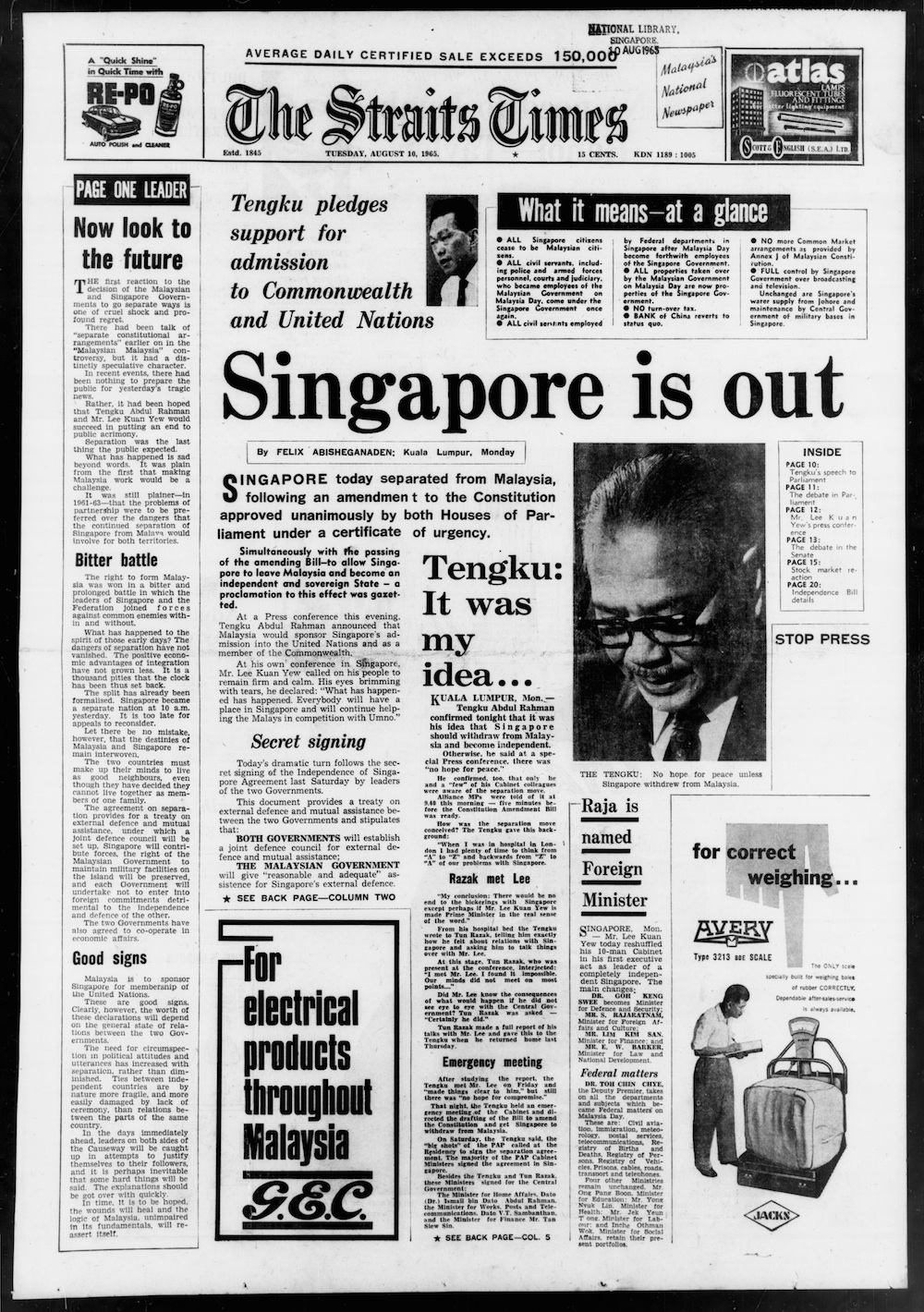
The famous "Singapore is out" headline on 10 August 1965, announcing the independence and sovereignty of the Republic of Singapore after it was expelled from the Federation of Malaysia the day prior

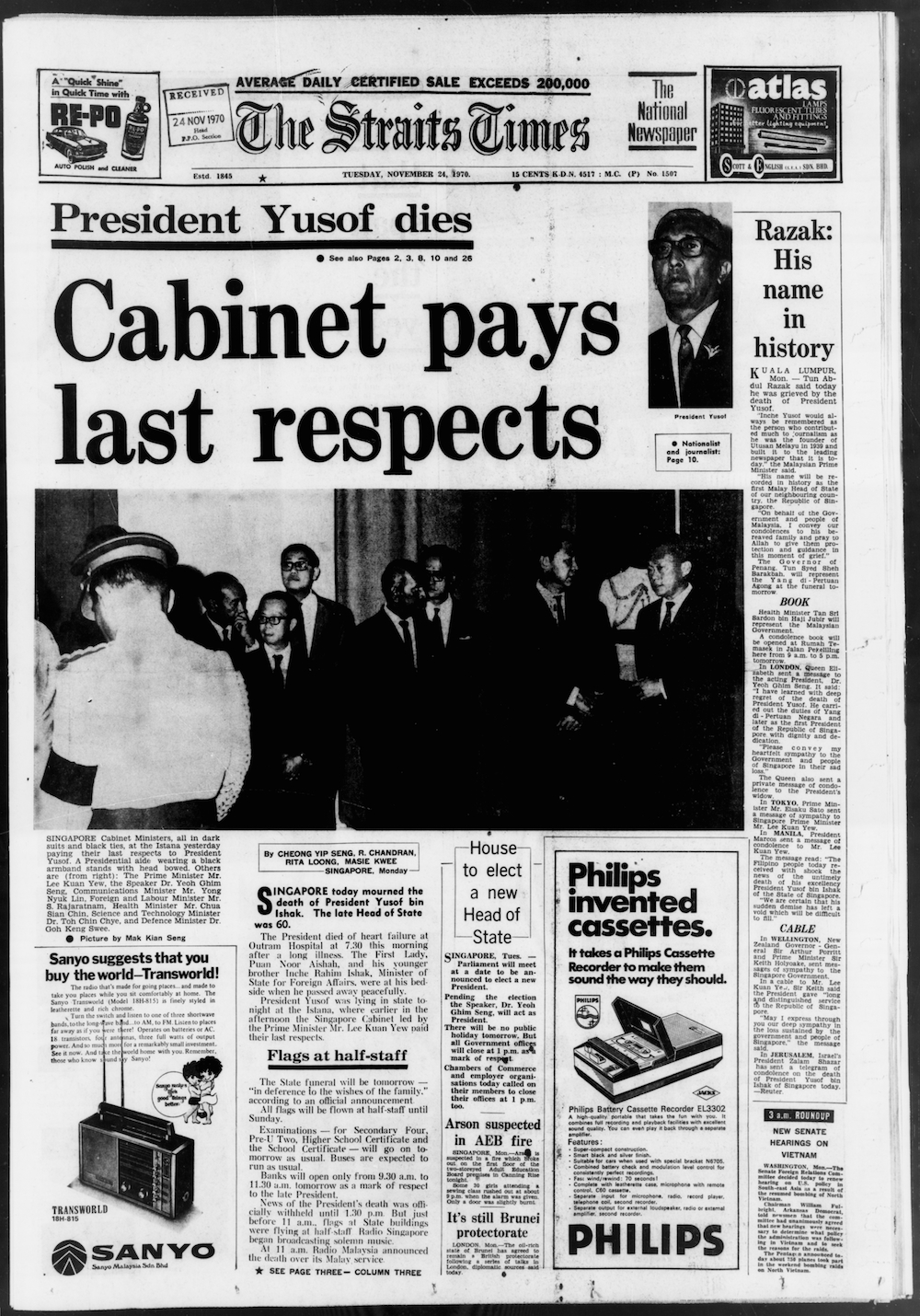
The newspaper on 24 November 1970, announcing the death of the first president of the Republic of Singapore Yusof Ishak the day prior

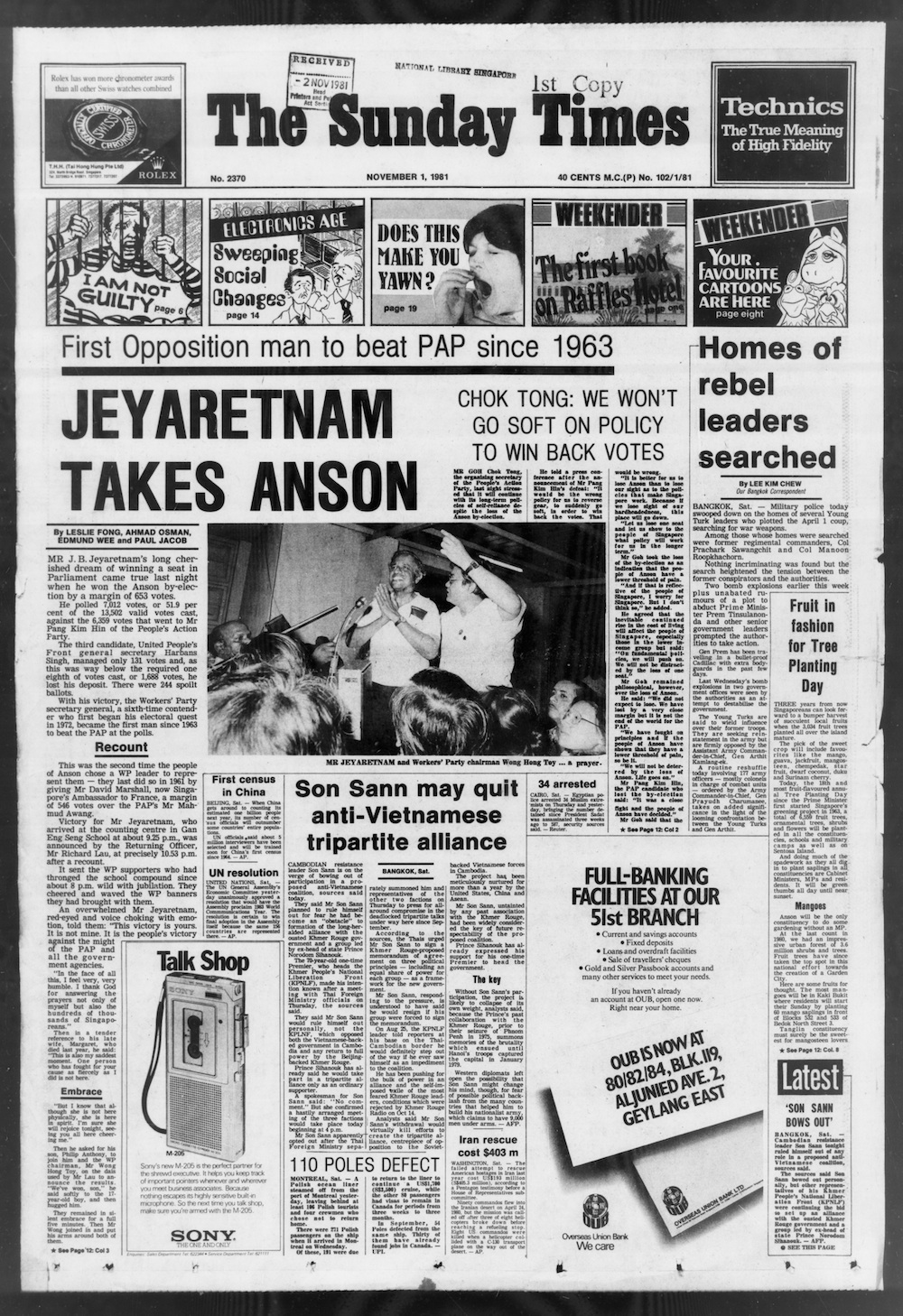
The Sunday Times edition on 1 November 1981, when Workers Party politician J. B. Jeyaretnam won the 1981 Anson by-election, becoming the first non-PAP politician to be elected to Parliament since Singapore gained independence in 1965

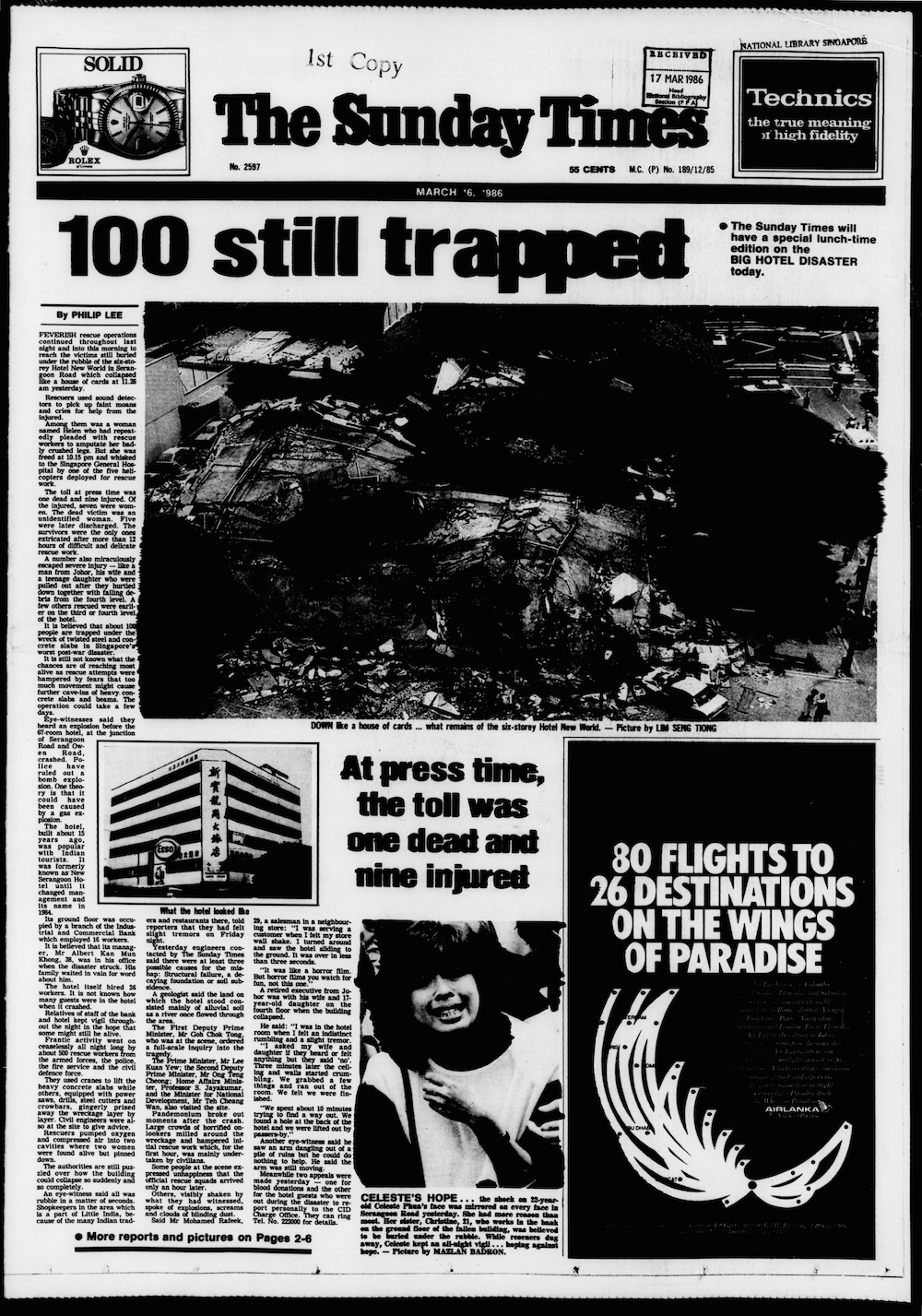
The Sunday Times edition on 16 March 1986, a day after the Collapse of Hotel New World

After Singapore gained its independence in 1965, the newspaper has since been referred to as Singapore's newspaper of record. Despite its history as being largely anti-PAP and anti-independence when Singapore was a colony, it has become largely pro-PAP after independence. The news website of The Straits Times launched on 1 January 1994, making it one of the first newspapers in the world to do so. The website remained entirely free until 2005 when paid subscription became required to fully access news and commentary.

==== Government interference ====
Prior to 1965, during the early days of Singaporean self-governance, the paper had an uneasy relationship with some politicians, including the leaders of the People's Action Party (PAP). This was partially due to Hoffman criticising the PAP during the 1959 general election and supporting the eventually defeated chief minister Lim Yew Hock. Editors were warned that any reportage that may threaten the merger between Singapore and the Malayan Federation may result in subversion charges, and that they may be detained without trial under the Preservation of Public Security Ordinance Act. Following criticism of the paper's coverage from Lee Kuan Yew after the 1979 by-elections and the 1980 general election, The Straits Times agreed to accept S. R. Nathan, a government nominee and the former Director of Internal Security, as its executive chairman. Subsequently, the Singaporean government restructured the entire newspaper industry, in which all papers published in English, Chinese, and Malay were brought under Singapore Press Holdings (SPH), established on 30 November 1984. Following the establishment of SPH, its subsidiaries, including The Straits Times, were allowed to maintain its own board of directors and editorial staff.

The newspaper is sometimes referred as "the mouthpiece" of the ruling party, or at least "mostly pro-government", as well as "close to the government". Chua Chin Hon, then The Straits Times's bureau chief for the United States, was quoted as saying that SPH's "editors have all been groomed as pro-government supporters and are careful to ensure that reporting of local events adheres closely to the official line" in a 2009 US diplomatic cable leaked by WikiLeaks. Past chairpersons of SPH have been civil or public servants. The SPH Chairman before the SPH media restructuring, Lee Boon Yang, was a former PAP cabinet minister who took over from Tony Tan, former Deputy Prime Minister. Many current ST management and senior editors also have close links to the government. SPH CEO Alan Chan was a former top civil servant and Principal Private Secretary to then Senior Minister Lee Kuan Yew. Current editor-in-chief Warren Fernandez was considered as a PAP candidate for the 2006 elections.

Name	Position(s) in SPH	Years served	Position(s) in public office	
Name	Position(s) in SPH	Years served	Before SPH	After SPH
S.R. Nathan	Executive chairman of the Straits Times Press/SPH	1982–1988	Perm Sec. Ministry of Foreign Affairs	Ambassador, President of Singapore
Lim Kim San	Executive chairman of SPH	1988–2002	Cabinet Minister, Chairman of Port of Singapore Authority	Chairman, Council of Presidential Advisers, Chancellor, Singapore Management University
Lim Chin Beng	Chairman of SPH	2002–2005		
Tony Tan	Executive chairman of SPH	2005–2011	Deputy Prime Minister	President of Singapore
Tjong Yik Min	President of SPH	1995–2002	Director of Internal Security Department	Group Chief Executive, Yeo Hiap Seng
Alan Chan	Director, president, chief executive of SPH	2002–2017	Perm. Sec. of the Ministry of Transport	Chairman of the Land Transport Authority (LTA)
Lee Boon Yang	Executive chairman of SPH	2011–2021	Cabinet Minister	
Zainul Abidin Rasheed	Editor of Berita Harian, Associate editor of ST	1976–1996		Senior Minister of State for Ministry of Foreign Affairs, Ambassador
Chua Lee Hoong	Review, Political editor of ST	1995–2012	Intelligence analyst of Internal Security Department	Senior Director of Resilience Policy and Research Centre and National Security Research Centre, Prime Minister's Office
Patrick Daniel	Editor-in-chief, deputy chief executive of SPH	1986–2017	Director in the Ministry of Trade and Industry	Interim CEO of SPH Media Trust
Ng Yat Chung	Chief executive of SPH	2017–2021	CEO of Neptune Orient Lines, Chief of Army, Chief of Defence Force	
Han Fook Kwang	Editor of ST, Editor-at-large	1989–present	Deputy Director of Ministry of Communications (Land Transport)	Senior Fellow at the S. Rajaratnam School of International Studies
Janadas Devan	Senior editor of ST	1997–2012	Academic	Chief of Government Communications

In his memoir OB Markers: My Straits Times Story, the newspaper's former editor-in-chief Cheong Yip Seng alleged that The Straits Times has a government-appointed "monitor", "someone who could watch to see if indeed the newsroom was beyond control", and that disapproval of the "monitor" could cost a reporter or editor from being internally promoted. Cheong identified the first monitor as S. R. Nathan, director of the Ministry of Defence's Security and Intelligence Division and later president of Singapore. Editors were bound by "out of bounds markers" to denote what topics are permissible for public discussion, such as anything that may produce ill-will and hostility between different races and religious groups.

As of July 2025, SPH has continued to exert editorial control, and has also expanded collaborations with Chinese state media such as Xinhua News Agency.

==== Preservation ====
In July 2007, the National Library Board signed an agreement with the Singapore Press Holdings to digitise the archives of The Straits Times going back to its founding in 1845. The archived materials are held in the Lee Kong Chian Reference Library and are available to the public through microfilm.

==== Singaporean of the Year award ====
Since 2016, The Straits Times awards the Singaporean of the Year award to a Singaporean citizen whose contributions in the previous year had impacted greatly on others in Singapore. Nominees are assessed by a panel of 15 judges who include Straits Times editors and other Singaporean personalities. The first award was given to a Good Samaritan Noriza A. Mansor, whose selfless act to clean up after an elderly who had defecated uncontrollably in the public in 2014 had moved the society. In 2020, the award was collectively given to the medical staff, other personnels, and volunteers who worked to control the COVID-19 pandemic in Singapore. Two news awards were introduced for 2025 edition, the Young Singaporean of the Year and the International Impact awards, to recognise a youth with outstanding contributions and people or organisation with outsize international contributions respectively.

===== Notable award winners =====
- 2016: Joseph Schooling and his parents, Colin and May.
- 2025: Amanda Yap (Young Singaporean of the Year)

==== 2023 circulation scandal ====
Following a 2023 leak published on socio-political website Wake Up, Singapore, The Straits Times revealed that SPH Media inflated its circulation figures in 2022 by 85–95,000 copies daily across all publications, or 10-12% of the reported daily average circulation. The numbers were inflated by means such as including copies that were printed and counted for circulation but destroyed, fictitious counts, and double-counting subscriptions.

== Public opinion ==
A 2020 Reuters Institute survey of 15 media outlets found that 73% of Singaporean respondents trusted reporting from The Straits Times, the second highest rating, just behind Channel NewsAsia (CNA), a local TV news channel.

== See also ==
- The New Straits Times – Malaysian edition spin-off and former sister publication
- Media of Singapore
- List of newspapers in Singapore
- List of state media by country
