= Constitution and Malaysia (Singapore Amendment) Act 1965 =

Law to separate Singapore from Malaysia

Parliament of Malaysia
- Long title: An Act to amend the Constitution of Malaysia and the Malaysia Act.
- Citation: Act No. 53 of 1965
- Territorial extent: Malaysia
- Passed by: Dewan Rakyat
- Passed: 9 August 1965
- Passed by: Dewan Negara
- Passed: 9 August 1965
- Royal assent: 9 August 1965
- Commenced: 9 August 1965

Legislative history

Initiating chamber: Dewan Rakyat
- Bill title: Constitution and Malaysia (Singapore Amendment) Bill 1965
- Introduced by: Tunku Abdul Rahman Putra Al-Haj, Prime Minister
- First reading: 9 August 1965
- Second reading: 9 August 1965
- Voting summary: 126 voted for; None voted against; 1 abstained; 21 absent
- Third reading: 9 August 1965
- Voting summary: 126 voted for; None voted against; 1 abstained; 21 absent

Revising chamber: Dewan Negara
- Bill title: Constitution and Malaysia (Singapore Amendment) Bill 1965
- Member(s) in charge: Abdul Razak Hussein, Deputy Prime Minister
- First reading: 9 August 1965
- Second reading: 9 August 1965
- Voting summary: 44 voted for; None voted against; None abstained; 13 absent
- Third reading: 9 August 1965
- Voting summary: 44 voted for; None voted against; None abstained; 13 absent

Related legislation
- Malaysian legislation Federal Constitution of Malaysia; Malaysia Act 1963 [Act No. 26 of 1963] Constitution (Amendment) Act 1966 [Act No. 59 of 1966] Singaporean legislation Constitution of the Republic of Singapore; Constitution (Amendment) Act 1965 [Act No. 8 of 1965] Republic of Singapore Independence Act 1965 [Act No. 9 of 1965]

Summary
- A constitutional amendment to separate Singapore from Malaysia and accordingly recognise Singapore as an independent and sovereign state.

Keywords
- Malaysia, Singapore, Constitution of Malaysia, Independence of Singapore Agreement 1965, Malaysia Agreement
- Status: In force

The Constitution and Malaysia (Singapore Amendment) Act 1965 (Malay: Akta Perlembagaan dan Malaysia (Pindaan Singapura) 1965) is a constitutional amendment passed by the Parliament of Malaysia to separate Singapore from Malaysia. This act provided that Singapore would on 9 August 1965 cease to be a state of Malaysia and would then become an independent and sovereign country. Its draft was included in the Independence of Singapore Agreement 1965 signed on 7 August 1965, just two days before the passage of this act.

== History ==
Following the 1962 Singaporean integration referendum and the signing of Malaysia Agreement, the Federation of Malaya, North Borneo (Sabah), Sarawak and Singapore were merged into a new federation now known as Malaysia on 16 September 1963.

However, the union between Singapore and Malaysia would not last, and tensions between the state government of Singapore and the federal government of Malaysia began to develop after the merger. These tensions included disagreement on the proportion of revenue contributions to the federal government, differences between the People's Action Party (PAP)'s and United Malays National Organisation (UMNO)'s views on affirmative action policies towards bumiputera, and ethnic tensions between Malay and Chinese that culminated in the 1964 Singapore race riots.

These conflicts caused the PAP and the Alliance Party to begin negotiating for an eventual and orderly separation of Singapore from Malaysia, with the negotiations beginning as early as 1964 and conducted in secret. These negotiations were not revealed to the general public until the day of Singapore's independence.

On 7 August 1965, the Independence of Singapore Agreement 1965 was signed by leaders from both the Malaysian and Singaporean governments, and the date of Singapore's independence was set on 9 August 1965. In the agreement, the draft bill for this act of Parliament was attached as its Annex B, and the Malaysian government was required by Article IV of the agreement to pass it in the Malaysian Parliament and make the act take effect on 9 August 1965.

On 9 August 1965, the bill was tabled to the Parliament of Malaysia by Malaysian Prime Minister Tunku Abdul Rahman and passed by the Dewan Rakyat with a vote of 126 favours versus 1 abstention. All Singaporean MPs, including Lee Kuan Yew, were notably not present during the debate in the lower house. The bill was similarly passed by all 44 senators present in the Dewan Negara (including one Singaporean senator, Ahmad bin Haji Taff), and it received royal assent from the Yang di-Pertuan Agong of Malaysia on the same day. With the bill's passage, Singapore was officially separated from Malaysia and became an independent nation.

== Legal provisions ==
The act contains 14 sections, as follows:

=== Short title ===
Section 1 provided that the short title of this act is Constitution and Malaysia (Singapore Amendment) Act, 1965.

=== Singapore to leave Malaysia ===
Section 2 stated that the Parliament of Malaysia may through this act allow Singapore to leave Malaysia and become an independent and sovereign state and nation, that is separate from and independent of Malaysia.

=== Independence of Singapore ===
Section 3 provided that Singapore would on 9 August 1965 (also referred to as "Singapore Day" in the act) cease to be a state of Malaysia and would thereupon become an independent and sovereign state and nation, and recognised as such by the Government of Malaysia. Accordingly, the Constitution of Malaysia and the Malaysia Act would also cease to apply to Singapore, except as provided in the remaining provisions of this act.

=== Transfer of executive and legislative powers ===
Section 4 also stated that the Government of Singapore would retain its pre-existing executive and legislative powers, while section 5 provided that the executive authority and legislative powers of the Parliament of Malaysia would cease to extend to Singapore and such authority and powers shall accordingly be transferred to the Government of Singapore.

=== Head of state ===
Section 6 stated that the King of Malaysia (Malay: Yang di-Pertuan Agong) would cease to be the head of state for Singapore and that all of His Majesty's sovereignty, jurisdiction, power and authority over Singapore would be relinquished and be subsequently vested in the Yang di-Pertuan Negara of Singapore, who would be the new head of state for Singapore. The position of Yang di-Pertuan Negara of Singapore would later be renamed as President of Singapore with the passing of the Constitution (Amendment) Act 1965 by the Singaporean Parliament.

=== Continuity of existing law ===
Section 7 stated that all existing laws still in force in Singapore immediately before 9 August 1965 would continue to have effect in the new nation, but may be amended or repealed by the Legislature of Singapore. These existing laws include the State Constitution of Singapore and the Federal Constitution of Malaysia, in which parts of them were inherited by Singapore through the Constitution (Amendment) Act 1965 and the Republic of Singapore Independence Act 1965 respectively. These inherited constitutional provisions would later be consolidated into one single document in 1980 as the Constitution of the Republic of Singapore.

=== Continuity of judiciary ===
Section 8 stated that until the Legislature of Singapore enacted law on its own judiciary, the jurisdiction, practice, and procedure of the High Court of Singapore and other subordinate courts in Singapore shall remain in place. Appeals from the High Court of Singapore would also continue to lie before Malaysia's Federal Court and eventually to the British Privy Council.

However, it was not until 1969 when the Supreme Court of Judicature Act 1969 was passed by the Singaporean Parliament to establish its own Supreme Court, that the judicial link between Singaporean and Malaysian courts was finally severed and appeals from Singapore High Court would no longer go through the Federal Court of Malaysia. As for appeals to the Privy Council from Singapore courts, this route was abolished in 1994, severing this judicial link with the United Kingdom.

=== Reversion of properties, rights, obligations, and liabilities ===
Section 9 stipulated that any property, right, obligation or liability which was originally that of the Government of Singapore before 16 September 1963 (referred to as "Malaysia Day" in the act), but later belonged to the Federal Government of Malaysia upon the merger in 1963, would upon Singapore's independence once again become the property or responsibility of Singapore.

=== Civil servants ===
Section 10 stated that all civil servants, whether of the armed forces, police force, or judiciary, who were originally employed by the Singapore government before 1963, but later became civil servants of the Malaysian government upon merger, would on Singapore Day be transferred back as employees of the Singaporean government. Additionally, any new civil servants who were recruited by the Malaysian government between 1963 and 1965 for employment in government departments that once belonged to the Singapore government, would upon Singapore's independence also become civil servants of the Singaporean government.

=== Termination of Singaporean senators and MPs ===
Section 11 stated that all 2 senators and 15 members of Parliament who represented Singapore in the Senate (Dewan Negara) and House of Representatives (Dewan Rakyat) respectively in the Malaysian Parliament would on Singapore Day ceased to be members of the Malaysian Parliament.

=== Termination of Malaysian citizenship ===
Section 12 stated that all existing Singapore citizens would on Singapore Day cease to be Malaysian citizens.

=== Succession of international agreements ===
Section 13 stated that all international treaties, agreements, or conventions entered into by the Yang di-Pertuan Agong or the government of Malaysia with another country when Singapore was part of the federation, would on Singapore Day be succeeded by the Singaporean government (if they were applicable to Singapore). International agreements undertaken by the United Kingdom on behalf of Singapore prior to 1963, which were later succeeded by the Malaysian government by virtue of Article 169 of the Malaysian Constitution, were also succeeded by the now-independent Singapore under this section. This succession also applied to decisions in international organizations that were accepted by the Malaysian government before Singapore's independence.

This section also deals extensively with the Anglo-Malayan Defence Agreement made in 1957, which in 1963 was made applicable to all parts of Malaysia (including Singapore) when Malaysia was formed. It specifically guaranteed that the United Kingdom would be able to continue to operate and use its military bases in Singapore after Singapore's independence.

=== Water agreements ===
Section 14 deals with two water agreements made in 1961 and 1962 between the City Council of Singapore and the State Government of Johor. Under this section, both the Malaysian and Singaporean governments would respectively guarantee the State Government of Johor and the Public Utilities Board of Singapore abide by the terms and conditions of the two water agreements.

== See also ==
- Albatross file
- Constitution of Malaysia
- Constitution of Singapore
- Independence of Singapore Agreement 1965
- Malaysia Agreement 1963
- State of Singapore (Malaysia)
