= Uniforms of the Singapore Police Force =

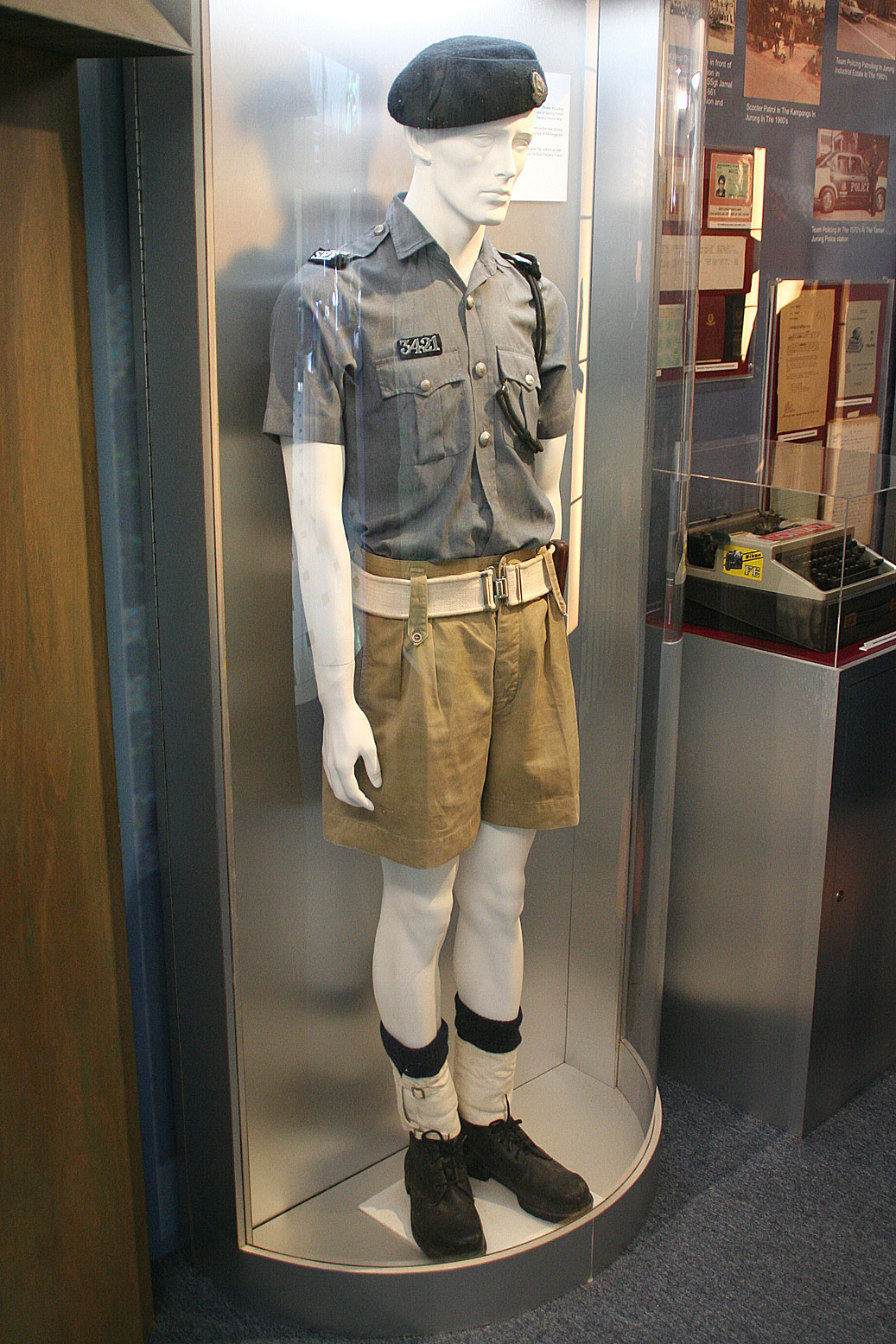
The khaki uniform worn from 1945 to 1971, seen here on display at Jurong Police Division Headquarters

The Singapore Police Force has employed several different styles of uniforms throughout its history. Since 1969 it has used dark blue for its uniforms, although the first police uniforms introduced in 1856 were also in the same colour.

== History ==
=== Early uniforms ===
The earliest law enforcement officers in the fledgling colony of Singapore wore no uniforms, until in 1856, when the Police Force Act was passed and vested full police powers upon the security forces then in existence, paving the way for uniforms to be introduced. The first uniforms were dark blue-coloured serge coats, trousers, cap and black shoes. White trousers are used for ceremonial parades and special duty. This proved unpopular as the thick material was deemed too uncomfortable in the local tropical climate.

=== Khakis ===
In 1879, a Commission of Enquiry was formed with the task of evaluating the existing uniform, and in 1890, khaki was formally introduced. The khaki uniform comprised a black headdress (locally known as the Songkok), khaki shirt and short pants, black puttees and ankle boots. Strict regulations requiring them to be heavily starched and ironed produced a cardboard-like material which stood out unnaturally. The white gaiters were removed as it was difficult to keep them clean, although they remained part of the ceremonial uniform till 1910. Marine Police uniforms were based on that of navy sailors, consisting of an all-white attire of long-sleeved shirts and short pants, while officers wore the same Khaki-based uniforms which were introduced in the land divisions from 1890.

As the Second World War drew to a close in 1945, the khaki uniform was updated with the black beret replacing the Songkok, and completed by blue grey flannel shirt, brown khaki short pants, dark blue hosetops, black boots and leather belt, and a navy blue whistle lanyard. This uniform became the primary uniform used throughout the force, and was last worn in 1971. Only the SPF Band retained the Songkok during the period.

An adapted form of the khaki was in force from 1963 to 1965, when the SPF was absorbed into the Royal Malaysia Police.

=== Dacron uniforms ===
In 1969, dacron blue made a comeback to the uniform with a force-wide change away from khaki. in part to coincide with Singapore's 150th anniversary since its founding in 1819. The new uniform comprised a dark blue peak cap, shirt, trousers, black belt, shoes and socks, and coded whistle lanyard in blue and white. Three large and four small metal buttons, metal collar badges, and a metal cap badge were affixed, and a black plastic name tag completed the uniform. Metallic ranks, if any, were fixed to the sleeve or on the shoulders for senior officers. The lanyard was changed to a metal chain in 1972, and in 1985, the material of the uniform was changed from 75% polyester 25% cotton to 100% polyester for a smarter bearing and turnout. Embroidered shoulder ranks and badges were adopted for all ranks in the 1990s.

When the Marine Police was reorganised and renamed as the Police Coast Guard in 1993, the uniform was also changed to a new uniform consisting of a long-sleeved shirt and long pants made of a slightly tougher polyester, and the replacement of almost all metal parts with the use of velcro and plastic buttons. They donned a blue beret, but were permitted to wear a baseball cap while on operational duties. Footwear was in the form of lace-up canvas shoes with non-slip soles. Unlike the combat uniform worn by other units in the police force, the uniform adopted hidden plastic buttons to avoid entanglements, and did away with garters since shoes, and not boots, are worn to allow rapid removal should water entry be required.

=== Uniform reviews from 2000 onwards ===
A series of reviews and changes to the uniforms took place across the various police units from the 2000s onwards. In 2002, the whistle chain was completely removed from all uniforms (except for some uniforms worn by the Gurkha Contingent) in the police force, the National Police Cadet Corps, as well as amongst CISCO officers. The new all-cotton combat uniform for the Police National Service Key Installation Protection Units was introduced in the same year.

Amongst land divisions, the No.3 uniform (also known as the working dress) was enhanced with the buttons sewn on (instead of using metal rings previously) in 2004, while the name tag was changed from using a metal pin to Velcro for affixing to the uniform. In 2006, riveted buttons, which were considered to be more secure, were introduced to replace the sewn on buttons. The trousers come with additional side pockets mid-way down the thighs with the main purpose of providing a convenient location for the M-pod, a PDA-sized gadget slated to be launched. Separately, the Police Maternity Dress was also introduced.

For the specialist divisions, the Police Tactical Unit changed their beret from dark blue to maroon in 2005. The combat uniform was also redesigned to a more loose-fitting attire with utility pockets, and the material changed to a cotton-polyester mix which is more durable and fire resistant. The colour of the uniform is also changed to a darker shade of blue for tactical purposes. High-heel boots with gutters were also introduced. The Police Coast Guard introduced a new set of uniforms composed of a helmet, dark blue polo top and Bermudas for officers performing patrolling duties on Pulau Ubin using bicycles. Also their officers will be changing into a combat uniform which is alike to those issue to the Police Tactical Unit.

From 30 September 2005, new duty belts made of synthetic leather were introduced force-wide, replacing the former practise of securing items individually on the trouser belt. First utilised by officers in Central Police Division on a trial-run basis, the new belt comprises two layers fastened together by velcro strips, allowing for equipment to be removed with ease and a more comfortable and lighter fit for front-line officers. The belt, together with the handcuff pouch, bullet pouch, T-baton and revolver holster are now personally issued to all regular, full-time police national servicemen, and Volunteer Special Constabulary officers. The old leather belts will, however, continue to be in use during non-front line and administrative duties, as well as during appropriate functions.

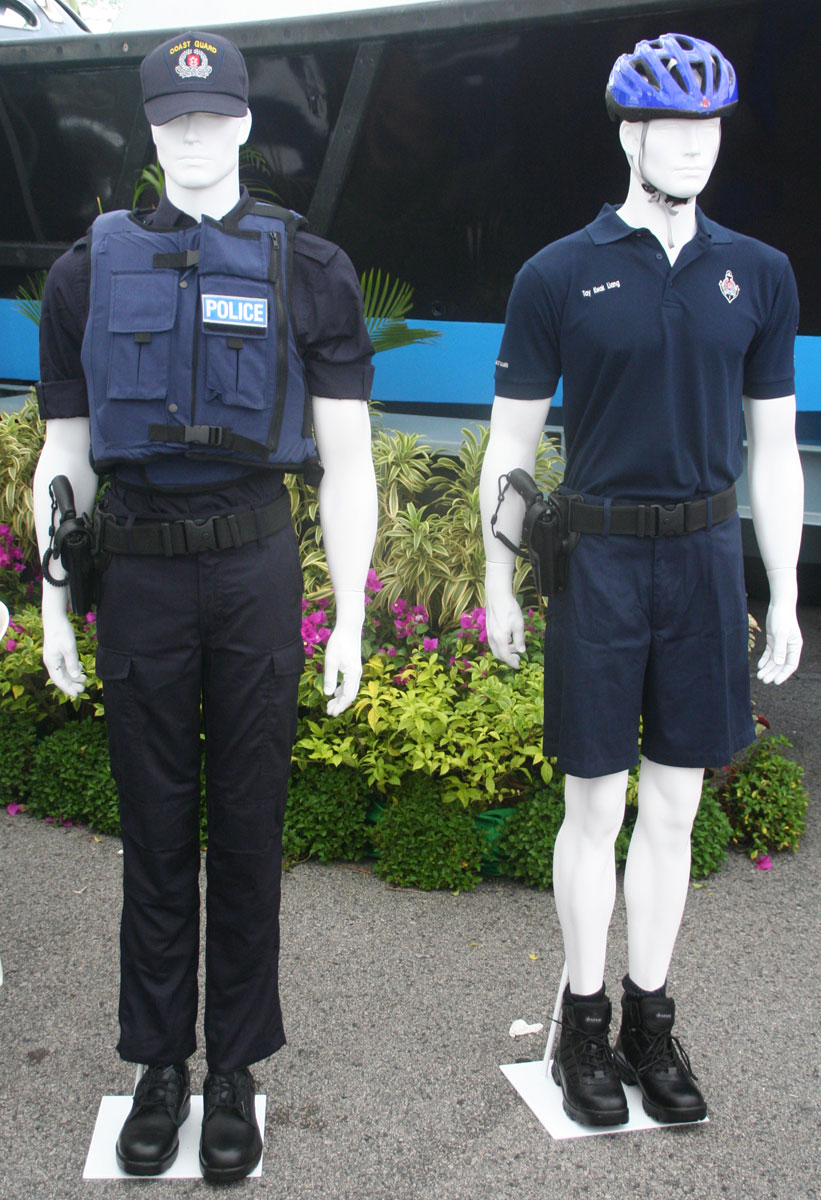
New uniforms of the Police Coast Guard on display at the Police Carnival 2006.

In May 2005, the island Patrol Uniform was introduced, consisting of a helmet, dark blue polo top and Bermuda shorts for Police Coast Guard officers performing bicycle patrol duties on Pulau Ubin. These were introduced to project a softer image on the island where recreational activities abound, and to provide greater comfort for the officers in the humid outdoor weather.

As part of a force-wide review of the police uniforms, the PCG adopted the new combat uniform similar to that worn by the Special Operations Command, albeit with a darker shade of blue. While they were introduced to overcome existing limitations of the current uniform, such as allowing for less-hindrance in body movement due to the more relaxed fit, and its non-flammable properties, they met with opposition from some officers who feel it projects the wrong image to the general public, including its "technician" look. Officers began to don the new combat uniform from 21 August 2006.

In 2006, the Gurkha Contingent implemented its biggest change to its uniform since the adoption of the present uniform three decades ago, just prior to the commencement of the 61st Annual Meetings of the Boards of Governors of the International Monetary Fund and the World Bank Group as part of Singapore 2006. Khaki-coloured berets in place of the dark blue beret. The combat dress (Dress No.4) was changed to a cotton-polyester material to match those adopted by other specialised units of the SPF, such as the Special Operations Command and the Police Coast Guard, albeit with a slightly darker shade of blue.

In 2008 - 2009, the black engraved plastic name-tags was changed to the black epoxy coated name-tags with the Home Team badge on the left. The name-tags with a safety-pinned backing were a safety hazard when struggling with suspects, progressively, the backing name-tags were fitted with Velcro for ease of fitting, and safety.

On 16 April 2018, the SPF introduced new uniforms made of 98% polyester and 2% spandex with better stretchability, perspiration absorption, and faster drying characteristics, as "part of ongoing efforts to improve officers' operational effectiveness and support them in their work". The word "police" is embroidered above the name tag of the new uniforms and the metallic buttons replaced with concealed plastic buttons for better comfort to allow officers put on the body vests over their uniforms. Riveted buttons are also fixed on the shoulders to allow the attachment of a body worn camera.

== Current uniforms ==
=== No.3 uniforms ===
The No.3 uniform is used by all police officers in various occasions which calls for more formal attire. The Traffic Police Department was amongst the few to move away from the all-blue attire, adopting a short-sleeved white tunic, dark blue breeches, a black leather Sam Browne belt, and riding boots for its officers performing mobile squad duties. A white crash helmet is worn when on the move, while a new dark blue jockey cap with chequered white and dark blue patterns around its circumference is worn when convenient while performing static duty.

Members of the Vigilante Corps are also attired by a white short-sleeved top similar in design to the dark blue version for normal officers, gold-coloured buttons and badges, and a dark blue beret in place of the peak cap.

==== Gurkha No.3 ====
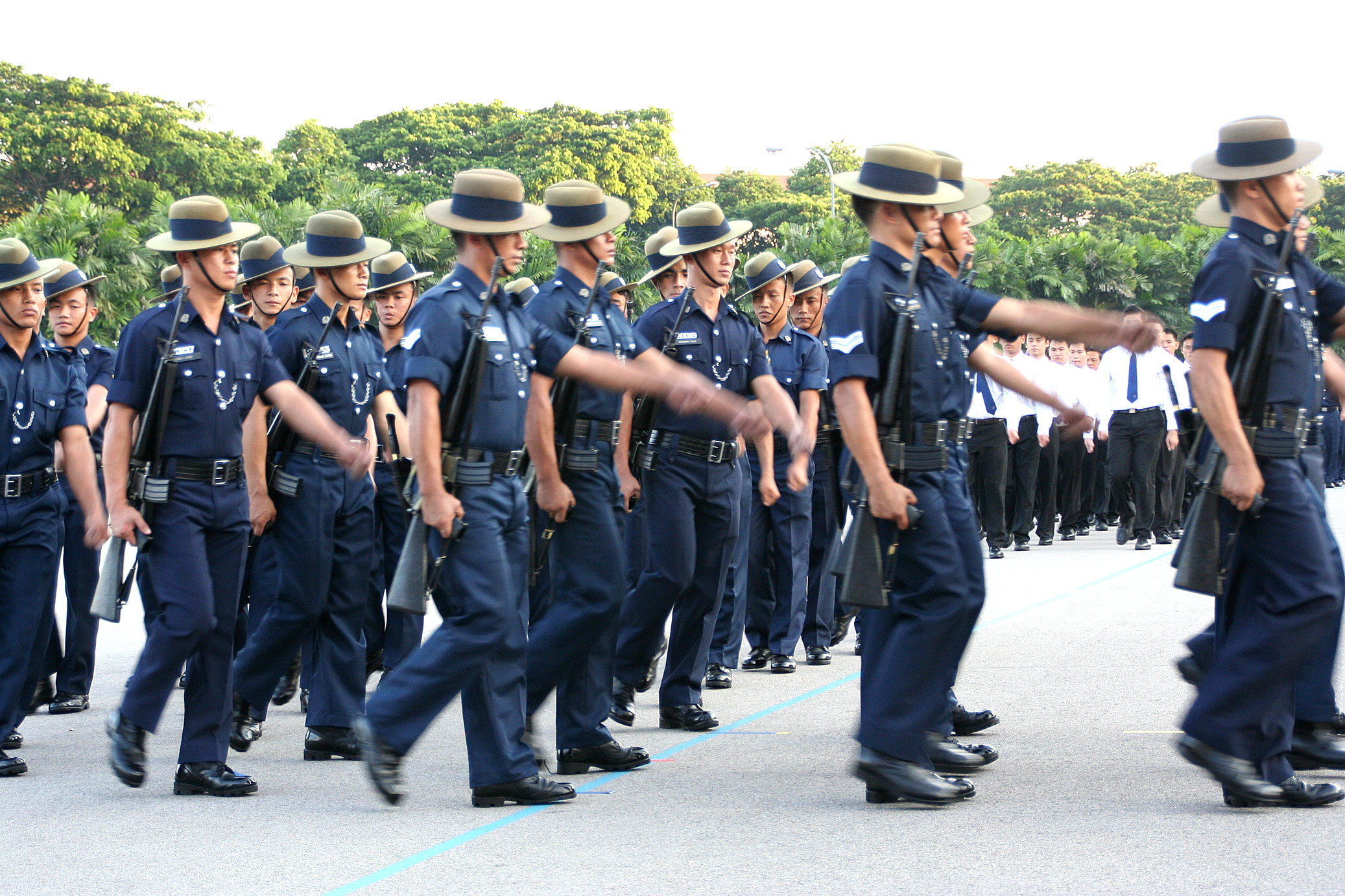
The Gurkha Contingent marches past at the Police Day Parade 2005 held for the last time at the Police academy grounds in Thomson Road. The officers are dressed in the No.3 dress and carry the M16 rifle

The Gurkha Contingent trooper's No.3 dress, also called the working dress, is for general duties, including guard duties and on parade. The dark blue outfit, largely adapted from the Singapore Police Force, includes the standard two front breast pockets on the shirt with aluminium anodised collar badges, buttons and a black plastic name tag atop the right breast pocket. Since removed in the rest of the SPF but retained by the GC are the chromed service number pinned above the name tag, and the whistle and chain.

The shirt is long-sleeved and neatly folded up, unlike the short-sleeved versions adopted for the No.3 dress of the SPF. The sleeves are rolled down when the sun sets, and rolled up again when the sun rises. GC trooper continue to wear aluminium badges of rank, which are worn on the right sleeve 11.5 centimetres below the right shoulder strap. Constables wear aluminium bars at the outer edges of the shoulder straps. The dark blue trousers are secured by the two-pronged black leather Garrison Belt, and completed by standard issued black leather boots.

The trooper wears the Hat Terrai Gurkha when inside the Gurkha Contingent parades and appreciation days, including Police Day Parades. Otherwise, he will be wearing a brown beret with a metal police cap badge similar to older berets worn by combat officers of the SPF when patrolling VIP homes and Currency House. He will be armed with a pistol and magazine pouch worn on the belt, and with the Kukri affixed to the back of his belt. Additional weaponry and equipment may be issued depending on situational needs.

Senior Gurkha officers are distinguished by a gold flash on the cap badge. The Duty Unit Sergeant wears an additional red sash with the uniform.

=== No.4 uniforms ===
Combat uniforms have also been adopted for specialist units such as those from the Special Operations Command and the Police Coast Guard (PCG), collectively known as the No.4 uniforms. These involve the replacement of metal buttons with sewn-on plastic ones, the avoidance of all other metallic accruements which are deemed potentially hazardous to the officer or to others and the use of long-sleeved shirts. SOC officers wear combat boots while officers in PCG use lace up leather shoes with non-slip soles. These units also tend to adopt the beret as their headgear, although PCG officers use the baseball cap while on operational duties.

==== Gurkha No.4 ====
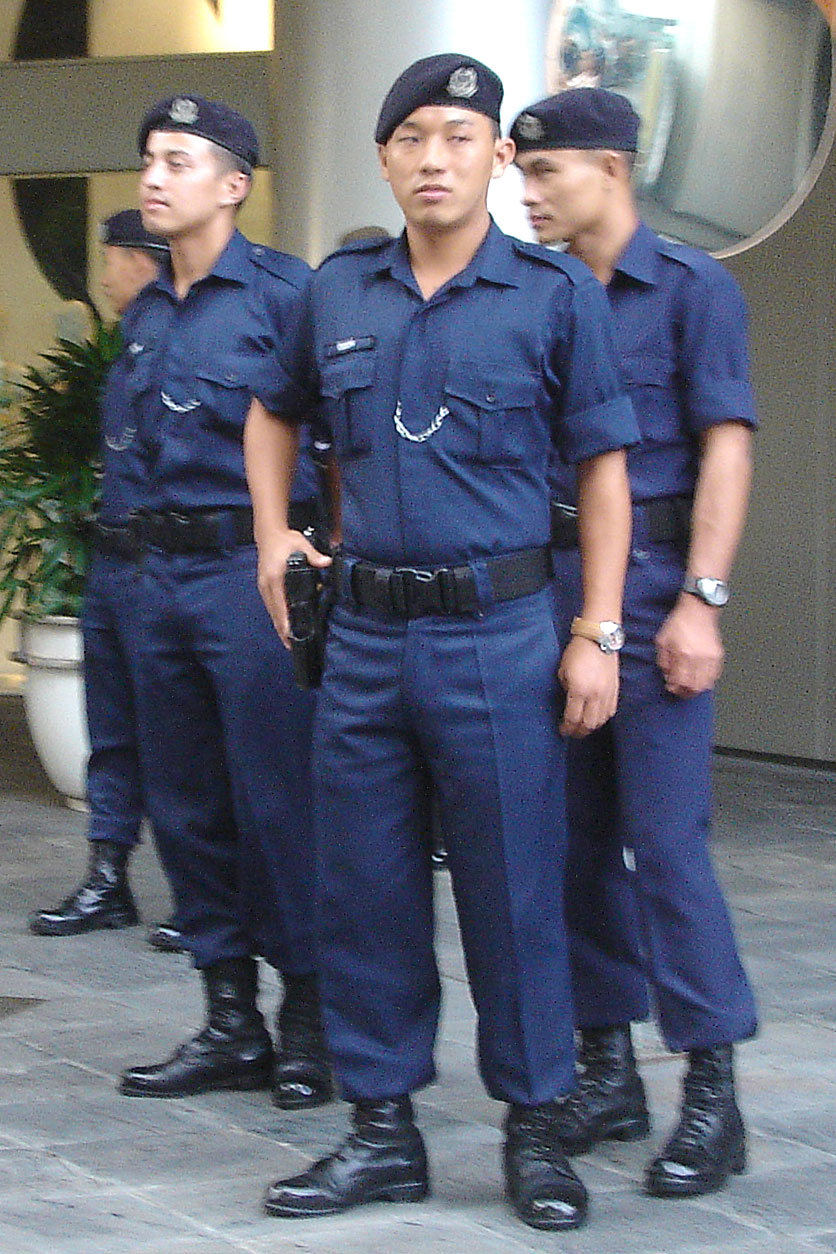
Members of the Gurkha Contingent gathering at Raffles City during the 117th IOC Session. These officers are off-duty, and hence wear the beret with their No.4 dress.

The Gurkha No.4 dress is adapted from the combat dress of their regular counterparts, and is also known as the night dress, as they are worn during night duty. They are also worn for civil security duty and training, as well as range practices at any time of the day. The long sleeves of the dark blue shirt is similarly rolled up and down depending on duty requirements and time of day, and is devoid of metal accruements. Junior officers wear their service numbers using white embroidered lettering on a dark blue Velcro backing fixed above their right breast pocket. Ranks are sewn on the right sleeves and made of embroidered, white cloth. The dark blue trousers are tucked into combat boots, and is topped by a dark blue beret.

In recent years, the GC has increasingly adopted the No.4 dress for active duty in public places, incorporating elements from the No.3 dress. Officers will therefore either wear brown-grey beret (when on official duty) or Hat Terrai Gurkha (only in important event) but with a grey life vest with the word "POLICE". They can also be armed with rifle weapon in important security-related events, e.g. Shangri-La Dialogue, ASEAN Summit and recent visits by US presidents (Joe Biden, Kamala Harris, Donald Trump, Kim Jong-un). The shirt sleeves are rolled up, and includes the metal whistle and chain. In addition, the rank is not sewn to the sleeves, but worn on a dark blue tab affixed to the right breast pocket with the rank in silver embroidered thread similar to that currently used by regular officers.

Less often seen, but formally in frequent use during rioting incidents is the fire-resistant version of the combat dress, which feature zipper breast pockets and on the trousers. Gurkha officers may also wear the jungle dress, with camouflage-coloured uniforms based on the British Army DPM and jockey cap or khaki-coloured beret, and complemented by various forms of webbing for paramilitary and military training, duties in rural and forested areas, combat fitness training and when dispatched out of Singapore for overseas exercises.
