= Aviation in Singapore =

Aviation industry in Singapore

Aviation in Singapore is a key component of the Singaporean economy. Besides currently the fourth busiest airport and the seventh busiest air cargo hub in Asia, the Singaporean aviation industry is also a significant aerospace maintenance, repair and overhaul centre.

The aviation industry is a significant contributor to the Singapore economy. In 2009, it contributed S$14.2 billion (5.4%) in direct and in-direct value-add to the Singaporean GDP. This included S$8.7 billion of direct contribution from the sector, S$3.1 billion through indirect contributions from the sector's supply chain and S$2.4 billion from consumer spending by employees of the aviation sector and its supply chain. 58,000 direct jobs were available in the industry, rising to 119,000 jobs if the entire supply chain is included. Out of the 58,000 direct jobs, aerospace manufacturing companies employed approximately 18,000 people, airline companies employed 15,000, while 24,000 worked in the airports and ground service companies. The sector also directly contributed S$1.5 billion in taxes in 2009.

Airlines registered in Singapore were also major contributors to the economy, employing over 15,000 in Singapore and providing a further 11,000 jobs in the supply chain in 2009. Overall, these airlines contribute over S$5.5 billion to the economy and supported 34,000 jobs in Singapore.

== History ==
In 1937, the Wearne Brothers launched the first commercial air service between Singapore and Malaya. It was called Wearne Air Services. On 28 June 1937, a de Havilland Dragon Rapide aircraft, the Governor Raffles, took off from Singapore to Kuala Lumpur and Penang. It was the inaugural commercial air service between these three cities by Wearnes Air Services. The WAS services ceased with the onset of World War II Japanese occupation of Malaya and Singapore. After the war, the air service was not continued.

Malayan Airways was established on 1 May 1947, by the Ocean Steamship Company of Liverpool, the Straits Steamship Company of Singapore and Imperial Airways. The airline's first flight was a chartered flight from the British Straits Settlement of Singapore to Kuala Lumpur on 2 April 1947 using an Airspeed Consul twin-engined aeroplane. Regular weekly scheduled flights quickly followed from Singapore to Kuala Lumpur, Ipoh and Penang from 1 May 1947 with the same aircraft type. The airline continued to expand during the rest of the 1940s and 1950s, as other British Commonwealth airlines (such as BOAC and Qantas Empire Airways) provided technical assistance, as well as assistance in joining IATA. By 1955, Malayan Airways' fleet had grown to include a large number of Douglas DC-3s, and went public in 1957. Other aircraft operated in the first two decades included the Douglas C-54 Skymaster, the Vickers Viscount, the Lockheed 1049 Super Constellation, the Bristol Britannia, de Havilland Comet 4 and the Fokker F27. In 1957, the airline became a state-run stock corporation.

When Malaya, Singapore, Sabah and Sarawak formed the Federation of Malaysia in 1963, the airline's name was changed, from "Malayan Airways" to "Malaysian Airways". MAL also took over Borneo Airways. In 1966, following Singapore's separation from the federation, the airline's name was changed again, to Malaysia-Singapore Airlines (MSA). The next year saw a rapid expansion in the airline's fleet and route, including the purchase of MSA's first Boeing aircraft, the Boeing 707s, as well the completion of a new high-rise headquarters in Singapore. Boeing 737s were added to the fleet soon after.

MSA ceased operations in 1972, when political disagreements between Singapore and Malaysia resulted in the formation of two entities: Singapore Airlines and Malaysian Airlines System. Singapore Airlines kept all 10 of MSA's Boeing 707s and 737s, retained the international routes out of Singapore as well as the existing corporate headquarters in the city, with J.Y. Pillay, former joint chief of MSA as its first chairperson. Female flight attendants continued to wear the sarong kebaya uniform, which had been first introduced in 1968. A local start-up advertising company, Batey Ads, was given the right to market the airline, eventually selecting the sarong and kebaya-clad air stewardesses as an icon for the airline and calling them Singapore Girls.

== Market ==
Countries with Open Skies Agreements with Singapore are highlighted in green.

As a result of an almost non-existent domestic market, Singapore has to place immediate emphasis on opening up the international market for its own airlines, as well as to allow foreign airlines to establish operations there. Singapore has Air Services Agreements with over 90 countries and territories, and has the most liberal aviation policy in Southeast Asia It has been an active advocate of open skies, and has concluded over 30 Open Skies Agreements, 18 of which are in the European Union, two in the Association of Southeast Asian Nations, five out of six members of the Cooperation Council for the Arab States of the Gulf, two in the Union of South American Nations and four members of the Pacific Islands Forum.

On 9 June 2006, it became the first Asian country to conclude a "horizontal" aviation agreement with the European Union. On 2 October 2007, Singapore became the second country to be allowed cabotage rights within the United Kingdom in a fully liberal aviation agreement. Singapore was also the first Asian country to conclude an Open Skies Agreement with the United States in 1997, and has significant liberal agreements with the United Arab Emirates.

Air service rights between Singapore-based carriers are allocated by the Air Traffic Rights Committee, established on 3 October 2003 in reaction to the awarding of multiple Air Operators Certificates in Singapore. The ATRC allocates air rights with a five-year validity. Unused rights for periods exceeding six months rights awarded but subsequently unable to meet pre-determined performance criteria will be returned to the pool for reallocation. Incumbent Singapore Airlines and its subsidiary airlines were allowed to retain all of their existing rights up to 2013, after which they will also carry a five-year validity and be subjected to the "use-it-or-lose-it" principle.

=== Open skies agreements ===
Country	Concluded	Effective	Rights	Source
Albania	19 January 2015			
Austria				
Bahrain	7 April 2005		1st to 6th freedoms; 7th freedom for cargo only	
Barbados	17 July 2013			
Belgium				
Belize	11 May 2017		1st to 6th freedoms; 7th freedom for cargo only	
Brunei Darussalam	1 May 2001; 27 December 2004	21 December 2001	1st to 6th freedoms; 7th freedom for cargo only	
Bulgaria	22 October 2009		1st to 6th freedoms	
Burundi	16 February 2016		1st to 6th freedoms; 7th freedom for cargo only	
Chile	1 May 2001	9 April 2002	1st to 6th freedoms; 7th freedom for cargo only	
Cook Islands		23 July 2006	1st to 6th freedoms; 7th freedom for cargo only	
Costa Rica				
Czech Republic	19 January 2009		1st to 6th freedoms	
Denmark	29 January 2008		1st to 6th freedoms; 7th freedom for cargo only	
Finland				
Germany				
Iceland	23 January 2009		1st to 7th freedoms	
Ireland	13 December 2006		1st to 6th freedoms	
Kuwait	4 November 2008		1st to 6th freedoms	
Lithuania	20 October 2009		1st to 7th freedoms	
Luxembourg				
Malta	8 August 2008	1 December 2010	1st to 7th freedoms	
New Zealand	1 May 2001	21 December 2001	1st to 6th freedoms; 7th freedom for cargo only	
Norway	29 January 2008		1st to 6th freedoms; 7th freedom for cargo only	
Oman	20 January 2009		1st to 6th freedoms	
Peru	27 August 2009		1st to 6th freedoms; 7th freedom for cargo only	
Portugal	27 February 2008	2010	1st to 6th freedoms	
Qatar	1988			
Romania	27 November 2008		1st to 6th freedoms	
Samoa	9 November 2002		1st to 6th freedoms; 7th freedom for cargo only	
Slovakia	22 November 2007	22 November 2007	1st to 6th freedoms	
Slovenia				
Solomon Islands	16 February 2016		1st to 6th freedoms; 7th freedom for cargo only	
Spain				
Sri Lanka	1 October 2003; 4 August 2005		1st to 7th freedoms	
Sweden	29 January 2008		1st to 6th freedoms; 7th freedom for cargo only	
Thailand	27 December 2004		1st to 6th freedoms	
Tonga		20 January 2004	1st to 6th freedoms; 7th freedom for cargo only	
United Arab Emirates	26 February 2004		1st to 9th freedoms	
United Kingdom	2 October 2007	March 2008	1st to 9th freedoms	
United States	1 May 2001	21 December 2001	1st to 6th freedoms; 7th freedom for cargo only	
Uruguay	2 October 2013			
Zambia	27 November 2008		1st to 6th freedoms	

Singapore has attempted to conclude an open skies agreement with Australia since 1996, but was met with numerous obstacles. There are similar hurdles trying to conclude OSAs with other countries such as Indonesia and the Philippines, mostly due to protectionist stances and a fear that it will not be a balanced agreement.

=== Air service agreements ===
Country	Latest conclusion	Rights	Source
Australia	23 September 2003	All destinations (Unlimited passenger/cargo; unlimited via most intermediate points; 5th freedom except to US)	
Brazil	29 June 2010	All destinations (Unlimited passenger/cargo via any intermediate points), 5th freedom passenger and cargo to any destination	
Canada	7 November 2007	All destinations (Unlimited passenger/cargo via selected intermediate points)	
China	30 November 2005	All destinations (Unlimited passenger/cargo, 5th freedom cargo to selected destinations)	
Colombia	27 August 2009	All destinations (8 passenger; 8 cargo; to increase to 14 each by January 2011)	
Ecuador	27 August 2009	All destinations (56, 5th freedom passenger; unlimited, 7th freedom cargo)	
France	29 November 2002	Paris (7)	
Greece	8 June 2006		
Japan	19 September 2008	Tokyo-Haneda (28), Tokyo-Narita (5th freedom to US), all other destinations (Unlimited passenger/cargo; 5th freedom passenger flights to US via Osaka and Nagoya)	
Kenya	18 January 2010	All destinations (Unlimited; 5th freedom with some restrictions)	
Malaysia	14 April 2009	Alor Setar (28), Bintulu (28), Ipoh (42), Labuan (28), Kerteh (28), Kota Bahru (28), Kota Kinabalu (42), Kuala Lumpur (Unlimited), Kuala Terengganu (28), Kuantan (28), Kuching (42) Langkawi (42), Malacca (28), Miri (28) Penang (70), Sandakan (28), Sibu (28), Tawau (28); unlimited cargo rights to all listed destinations	
Philippines	8 May 2009	Cebu, Davao, Manila, Manila-Clark (with 5th freedom except to Canada/US)	
Saudi Arabia	22 August 2008	Dammam (Unlimited), (14; 5th freedom to selected destinations)	
Ukraine	2 June 2024	All destinations (Unlimited)	

Figures in brackets refer to maximum frequencies per week.

There was much difficulties in attempts to open up the Singapore-Malaysia sector, until 2008.

== Low-cost travel ==
Partly in response from competition from AirAsia based in neighbouring Malaysia, Singapore-based low-cost airlines only began to operate from the year 2004 when Valuair launched its maiden flight on 5 May 2004. In rapid succession, two of the largest airlines operating out of Singapore Changi Airport began operating their competing carriers, namely Singapore Airlines' Tiger Airways and Qantas' Jetstar Asia, who began commercial flights on 15 September 2004 and 25 November 2004 respectively. A planned Singapore-affiliated airline by AirAsia was scuttled when it failed to obtain an air operator's certificate from the Singaporean authorities, possibly in retaliation to the Indonesian ban on all new low-cost flights into the country by non-Indonesian carriers.

The physical size of Singapore meant practically all low-cost air routes have to be international in nature, imposing greater risks on the airlines with the greater dependence on aviation negotiations between Singapore and its markets. With relatively limited air rights on offer in the Southeast Asian region, the three airlines had to contend with flying to a select number of destinations where air rights are available, resulting in intense, direct competition on specific routes. The Singapore-Bangkok sector, for example, saw all three Singapore-based carriers, as well as AirAsia flying the route prior to market consolidation. The airlines were able to take advantage of subsequent liberation of air rights between Singapore, Brunei and Thailand in late 2004, although key destinations such as Kuala Lumpur remain closed to all low-cost airlines.

With soaring fuel prices, limited markets, and the impact from the 2004 Indian Ocean earthquake, the low-cost aviation industry went into a consolidation phase, with Valuair, the only low-cost airline without a major stakeholder, becoming the first casualty when it was merged with Jetstar Asia Airways on 24 July 2005. The airline was still operated like a separate airline, however, due to regulatory restrictions on its flights to Indonesia, where Jetstar Asia had no access after the Indonesian ban.

The fiscal fortunes of the two remaining players began to diverge, however, when it became apparent that Jetstar Asia was struggling, while Tiger Airways was doing relatively well.

Keen interest by low-cost carriers to serve the highly protected Singapore-Kuala Lumpur market was one of the primary reasons in bringing forward a partial liberation of the route despite possible business impact particular on Malaysia Airlines. Both countries inked an agreement on 23 November 2007 to allow up to two flights a day for low-cost carriers from each country from 1 February 2008. The route will be fully liberalised on 1 December 2008, with a possibility of opening up other routes between Singapore and secondary Malaysian cities in planned meetings in early 2008.

== Corporate aviation ==
Seletar Airport serves as a hub for corporate aircraft sales and servicing. Although presently limited by runway length for operations of ultra-long range aircraft, Seletar is home to manufacturer approved service centres, such as Jet Aviation (for Gulfstream Aerospace, Bombardier and Cessna) and Hawker Pacific Aerospace (Hawker Beechcraft and Dassault Falcon). It is also the home base for several smaller charter aircraft operations serving regional corporate travel and aeromedical evacuations.

== Airport security ==
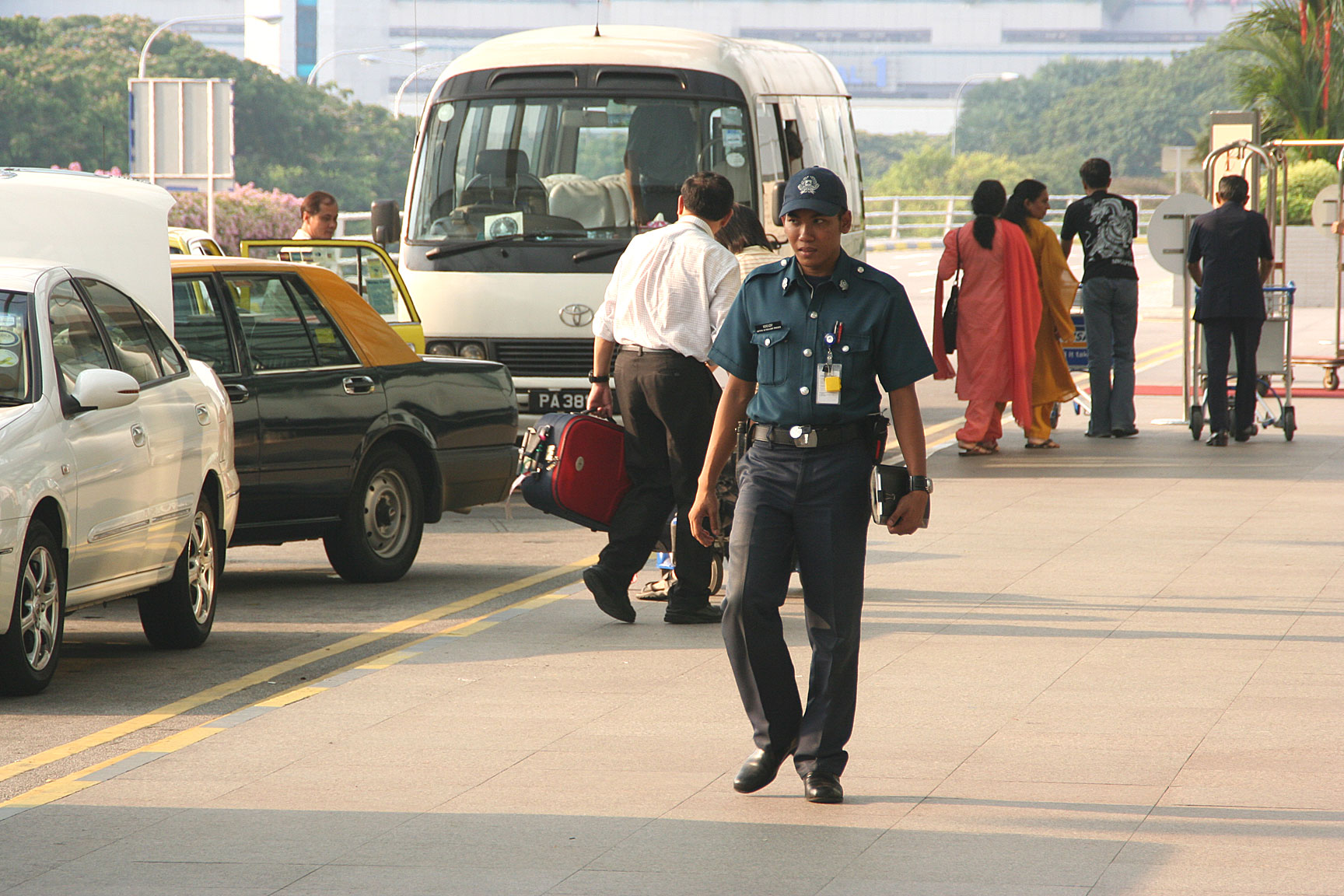
An Aetos auxiliary police officer stationed outside the Departure Hall of Terminal 2, Singapore Changi Airport

Security for the country's three international passenger airports comes under the purview of the Airport Police Division of the Singapore Police Force, although resources are concentrated at Singapore Changi Airport where scheduled passenger traffic dominates. Seletar Airport, which specialises in handling non-scheduled and training flights, is seen as posing less of a security issue. Since the September 11, 2001 attacks, and the naming of Changi Airport as a terrorism target by the Jemaah Islamiyah, the airport's security has been stepped up. Roving patrol teams composed of two soldiers and a police officer armed with machine guns patrol the terminals at random.

Assisting the state organisations, are the security services provided by the ground handlers, namely that of the Singapore Airport Terminal Services's SATS Security Services, and the Aetos Security Management Private Limited, formed from a merger of the Changi International Airport Services's airport security unit and that of other companies to become a single island-wide auxiliary police company. These officers man check-in counters to screen luggage, control movements into restricted areas, and so forth.

Since 2005, an upgrade in screening technology and rising security concerns led to all luggage-screening processes to be conducted behind closed-doors. Plans are also in place to install over 400 cameras around the airport to monitor passenger activity around the clock and to check on suspicious parcels and activity to prevent bomb attacks similar to the 2005 Songkhla bombings in Southern Thailand where Hat Yai International Airport was targeted. Tenders to incorporate such a system was called in late September 2005.

== See also ==
- Airport Logistics Park
- Asian Aerospace
- Civil Aviation Authority of Singapore
- Seletar Airport
- Singapore Changi Airport
