= East Region, Singapore =

East Region
- Region

Other transcription(s)
  - Malay: Wilayah Timur (Singapura)
  - Chinese: 东区 (新加坡)
  - Tamil: கிழக்குப் பிராந்தியம் (சிங்கப்பூர்)
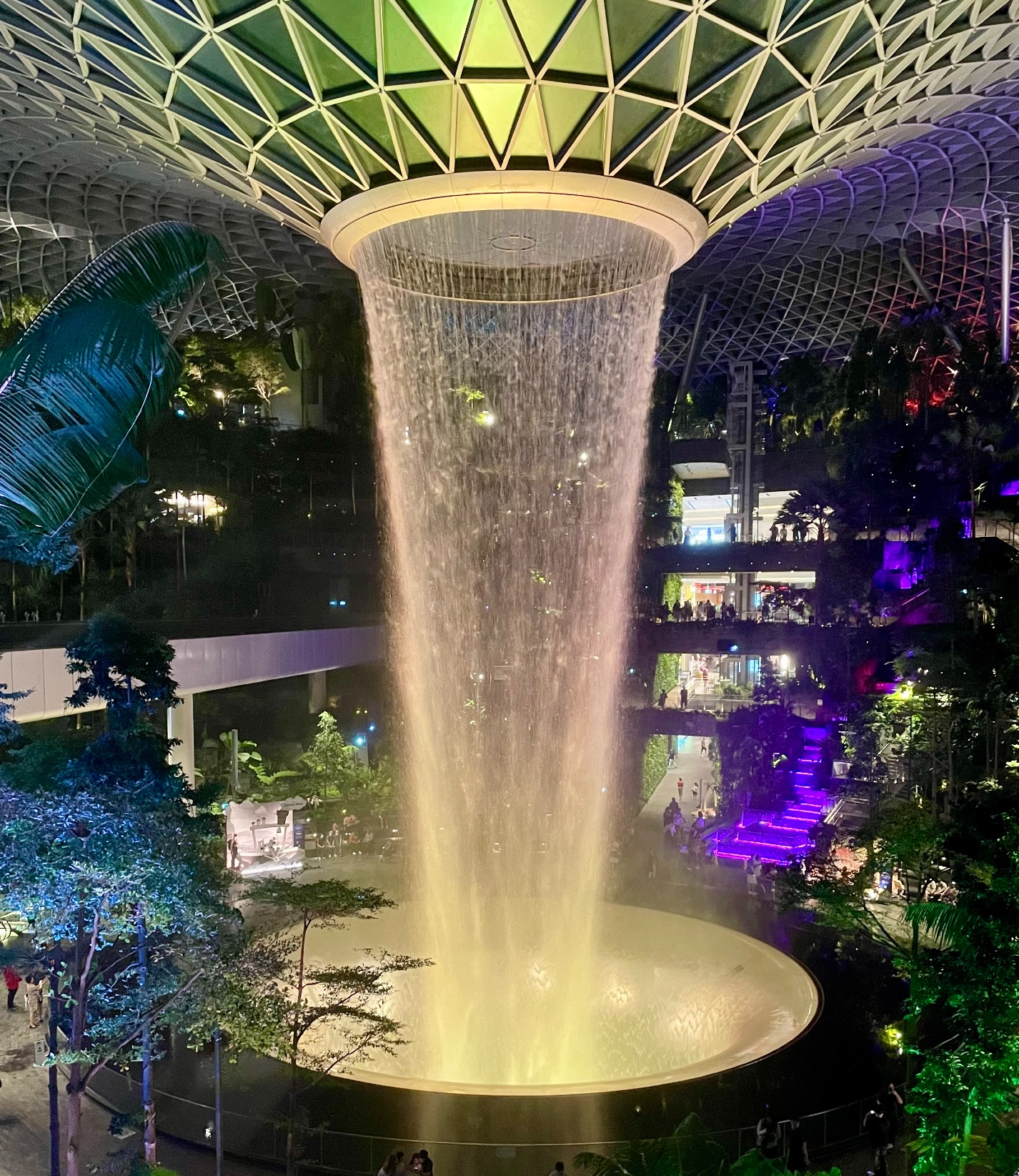
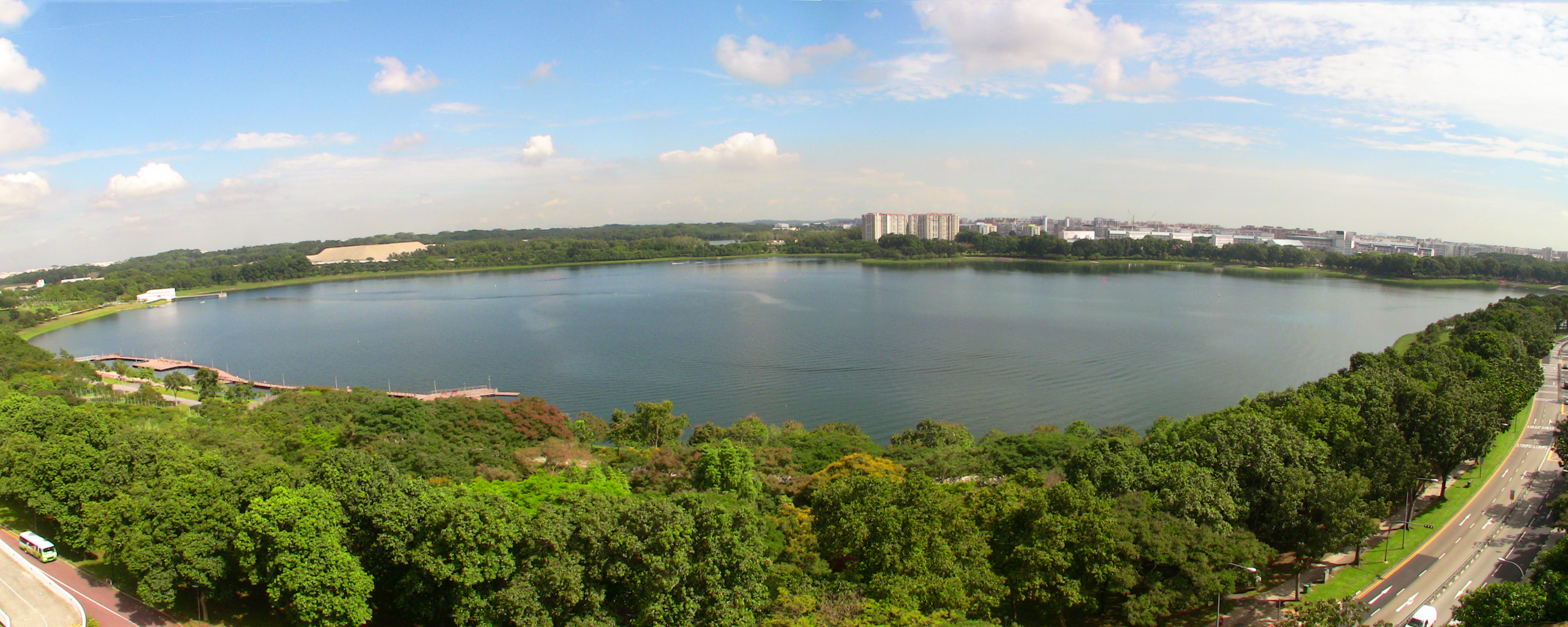
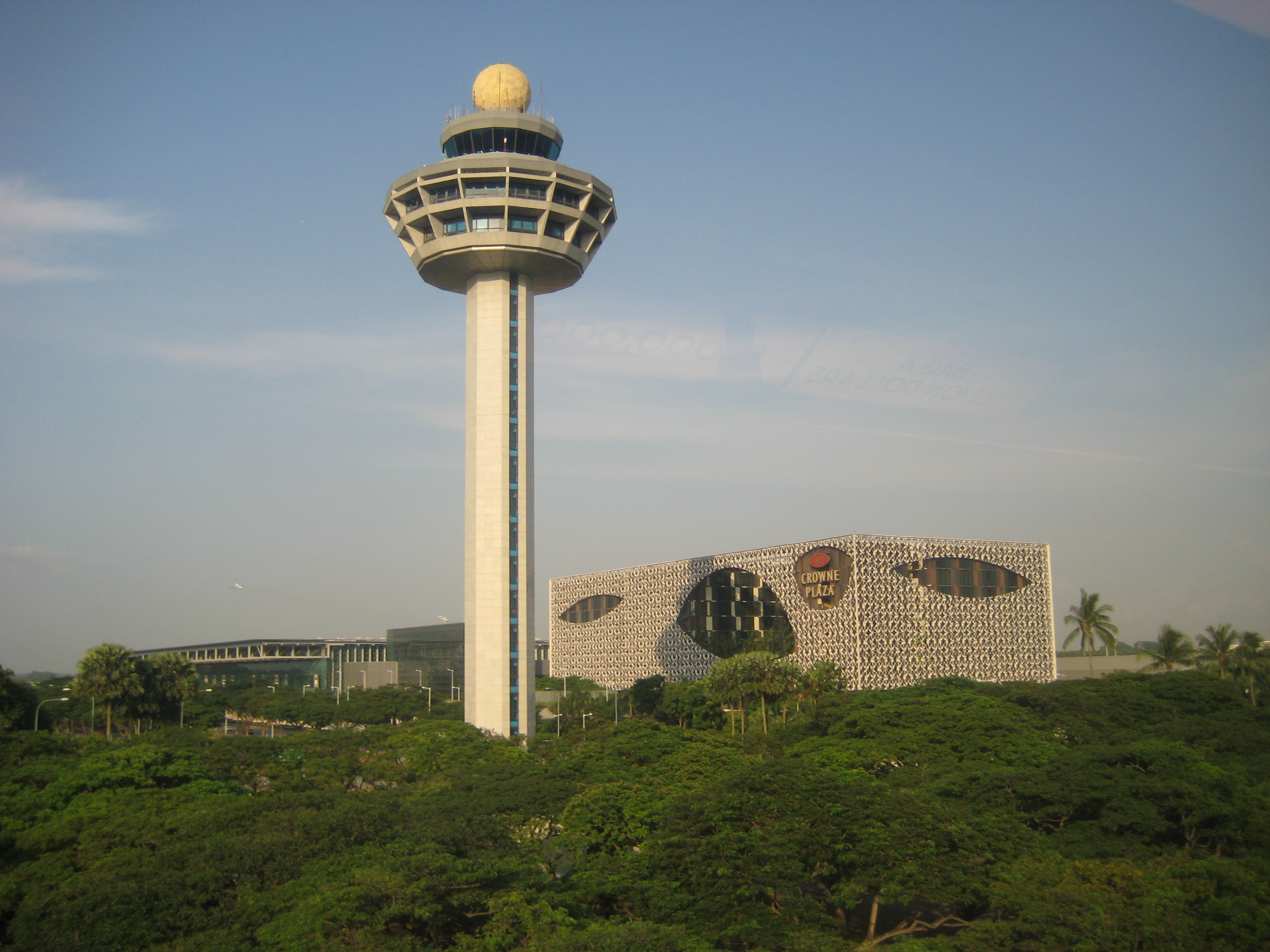
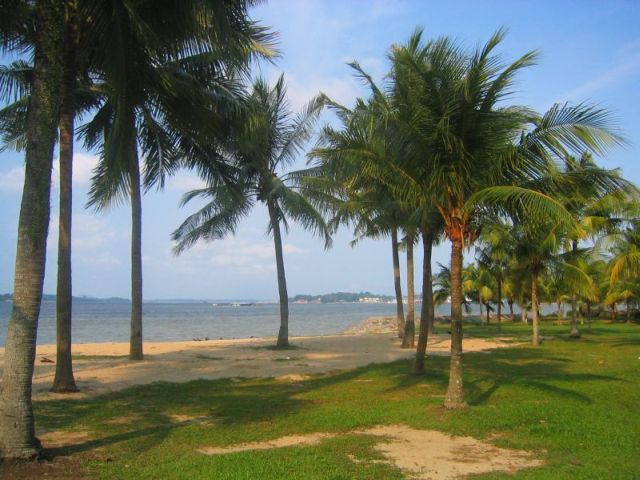
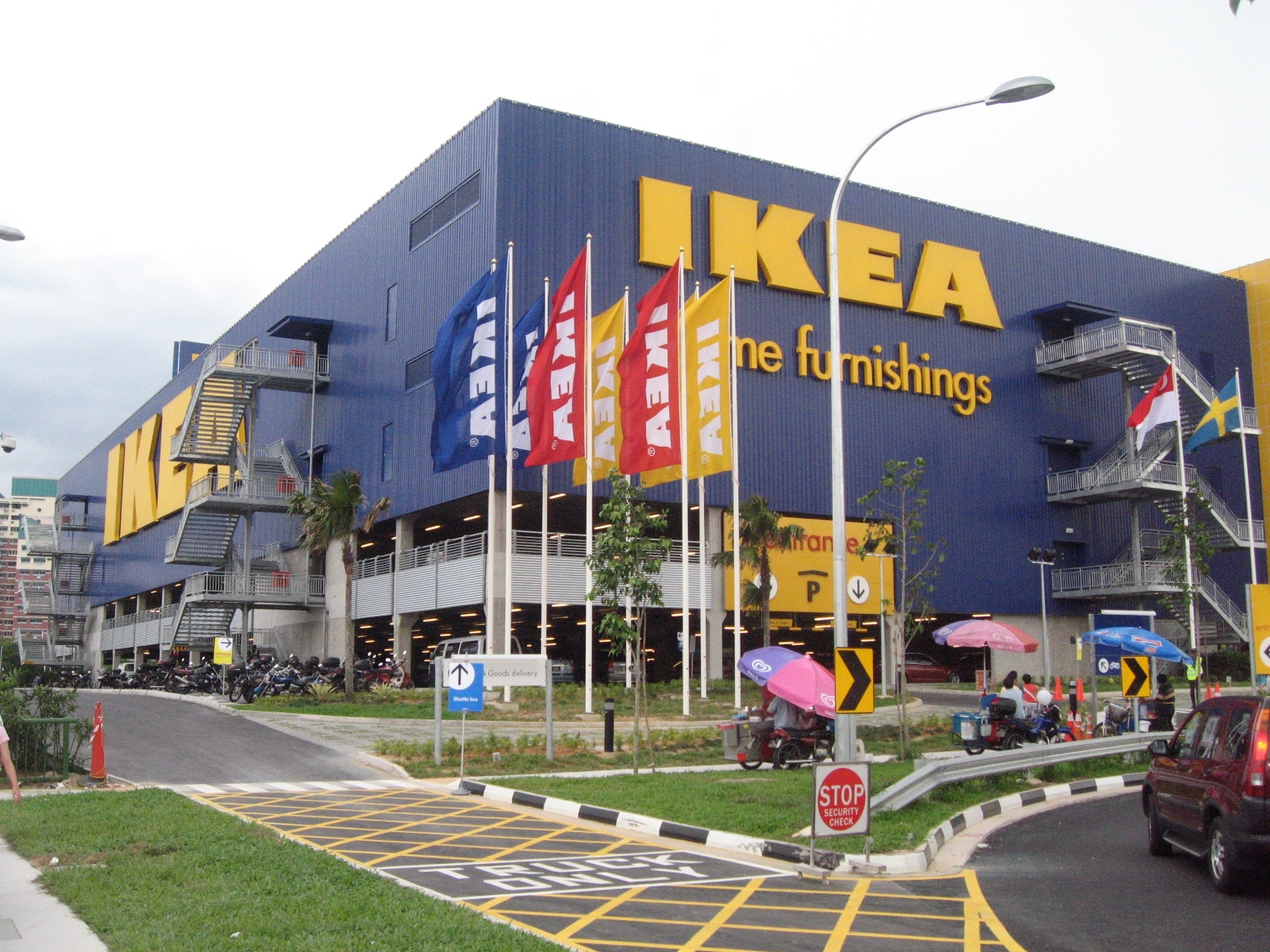
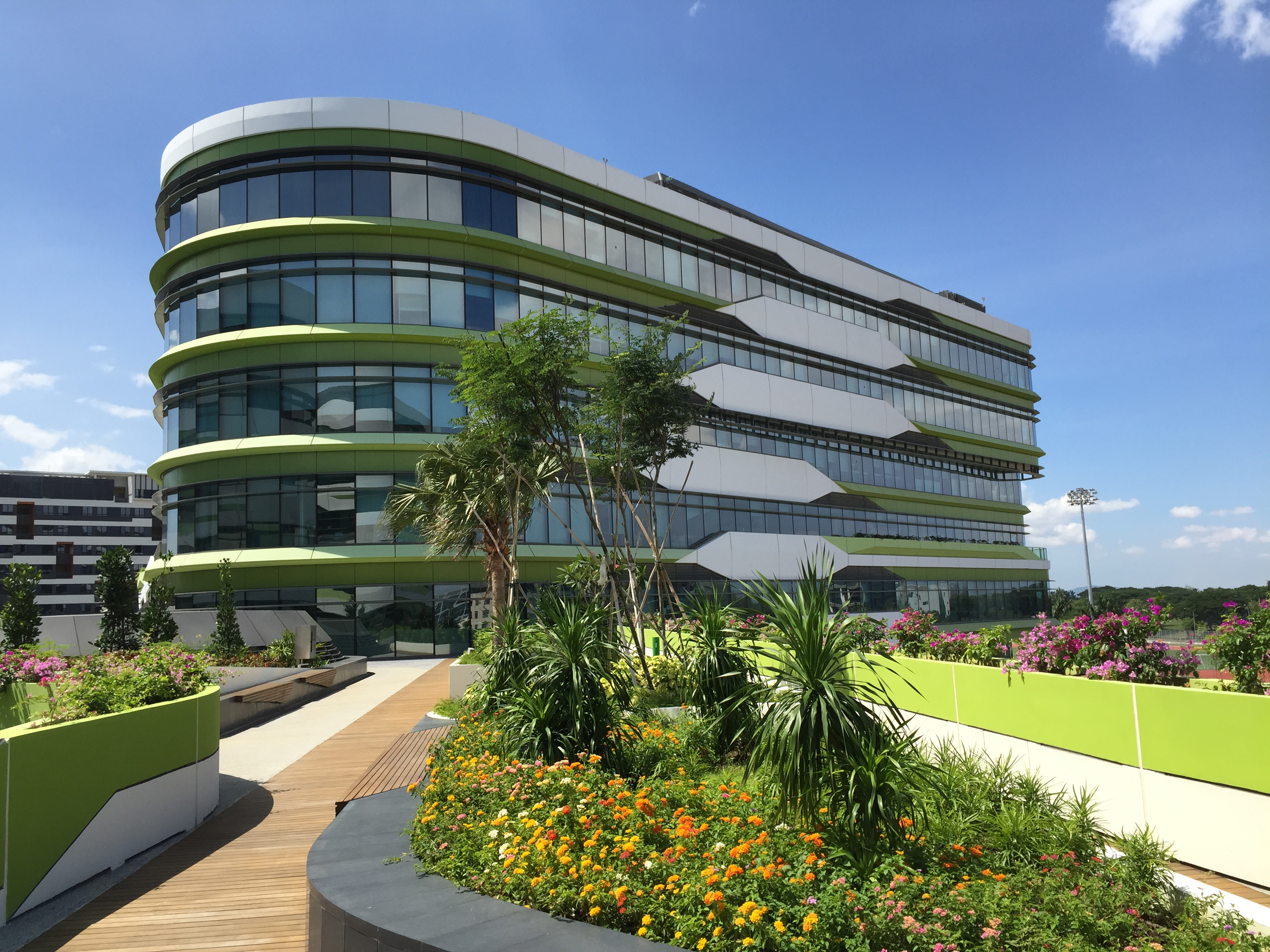
- From top left to right: Jewel Changi Airport Rain Fortex, Bedok Reservoir, Singapore Changi Airport, Pasir Ris Park, IKEA in Tampines, Singapore University of Technology and Design

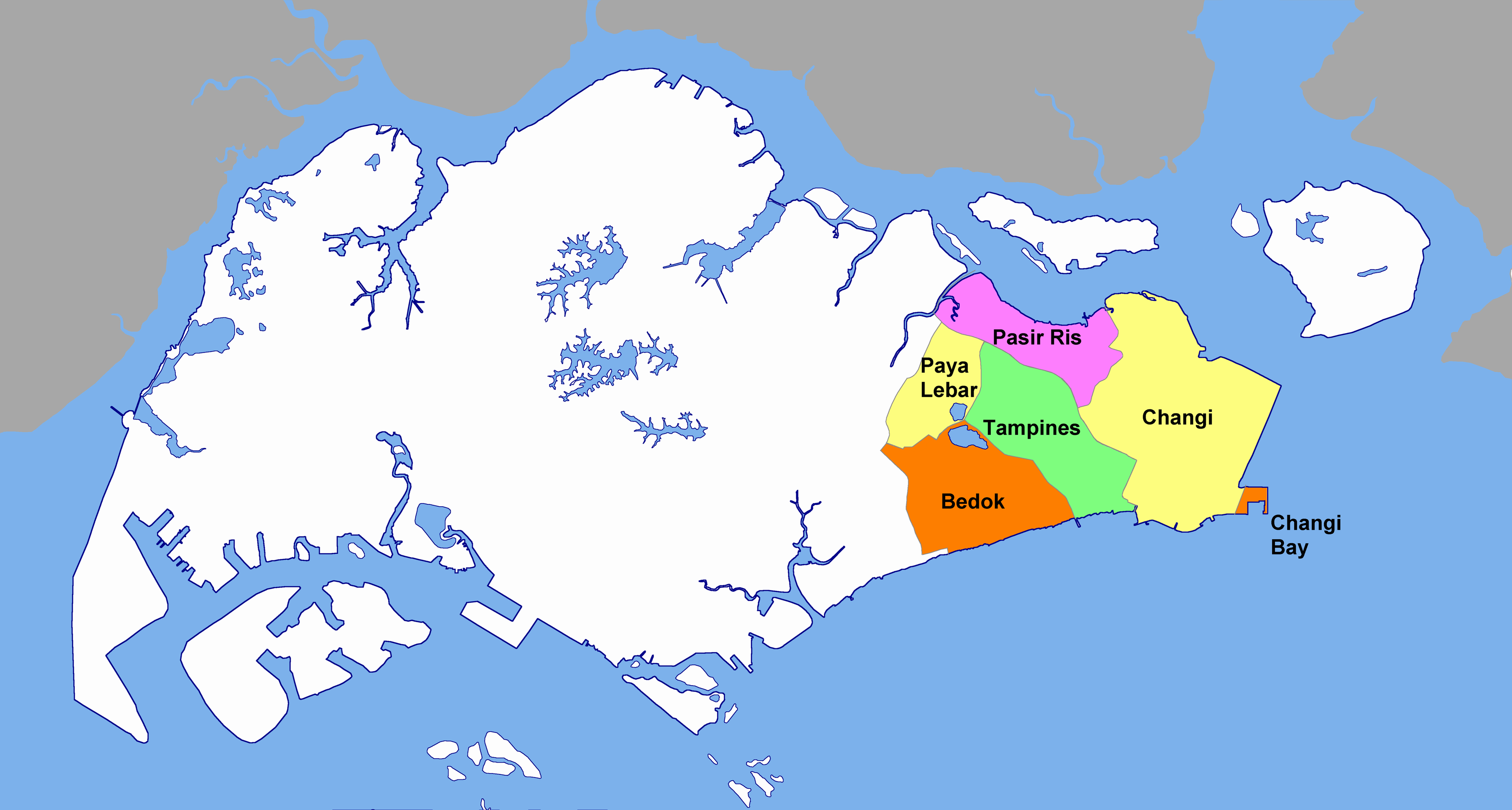
- The East Region consists of six planning areas.
- Coordinates: 1°20′58.53″N 103°57′24.44″E
- Country: Singapore
- Planning Areas: 6: Bedok; Changi; Changi Bay; Paya Lebar; Pasir Ris; Tampines
- CDC: North East CDC; South East CDC
- Regional centre: Tampines
- Largest PA: Bedok

Government
  - Mayors: North East CDC: Baey Yam Keng; South East CDC: Dinesh Vasu Dash
  - Deputy-Mayors: North East CDC: Amirul Farhan Yusof; South East CDC: Bakar Hafiz Rosli

Area
  - Total: 93.1 km^{2} (35.9 sq mi)

Population (2020)
  - Total: 685,890
  - Density: 7,370/km^{2} (19,100/sq mi)
- ISO 3166 code: SG-02

The East Region is one of the five regions in the city-state of Singapore. The region is the 2nd most densely populated among the five, and has the smallest land area. Bedok is the region's most populous town and Tampines is the regional centre of the area. Comprising 11,000 hectares (27,000 acres), it includes six planning areas and is also home to Singapore's Changi Airport and Paya Lebar Air Base.

The region also houses the Changi Naval Base and Changi Prison, which was first constructed in 1936 by the British and is Singapore's oldest internment facility.

== Geography ==
With a total land area of 93.1 km^{2} (35.9 sq mi), the region is situated on the eastern corner of Singapore Island, bordering the North-East Region to the north-west, Central Region to the south-west and shares riverine borders with the North-Eastern Islands to the north.

== Government ==
The East Region is governed locally by two different Community Development Councils, namely the North East CDC and the South East CDC, both divided into six different planning areas.

=== Planning Areas ===
Planning Area	Area (km^{2})	Population	Density (/km^{2})
Bedok	21.69	289,750	13,360.5
Changi	40.61	2,530	62.3
Changi Bay	1.7	0	0
Pasir Ris	15.02	139,890	9,313
Paya Lebar	11.69	40	3.4
Tampines	20.89	261,230	12,506.2

== Economy ==
Manufacturing makes up majority of the economical activity in the region, with industrial estates located in the planning areas of Bedok, Changi, Pasir Ris, Tampines and Paya Lebar. Pasir Ris and Tampines Wafer Fabrication Parks houses several major semiconductor fabrication companies such as GlobalFoundries, UMC, SSMC and Siltronic. IBM had also set up a S$90 million technology park along Tampines Industrial Avenue, to manufacture its System Z mainframes and high-end POWER systems for its clients across Asia.

Changi is also a major aviation and commercial zone in the region with airlines such as, Singapore Airlines, Singapore Airlines Cargo, Scoot, Valuair and Tigerair having their head offices in the area. Changi Business Park, located in Changi South, also houses several commercial offices of business such as, DBS Bank, Standard Chartered and IBM.

== Education ==
Residents living within the area have access to different educational facilities ranging from preschools to primary and secondary schools as these are located around the different towns in the East region. The area is also home to various tertiary institutions such as various ITEs, Polyechnics and Junior Colleges, including ITE College East, Singapore University of Technology and Design, Tampines Meridian Junior College, Temasek Junior College, Temasek Polytechnic and Victoria Junior College, 6 international schools namely, Global Indian International School (GIIS), East Coast Campus, NPS International School, Sekolah Indonesia Singapura, Overseas Family School and United World College of South East Asia (Tampines Campus) and a special education school, Katong School (APSN).
