= Former City Hall, Singapore =

Monument in Singapore

Coordinates: 1°17′26″N 103°51′06″E

Former City Hall
- Dewan Bandaraya Singapura
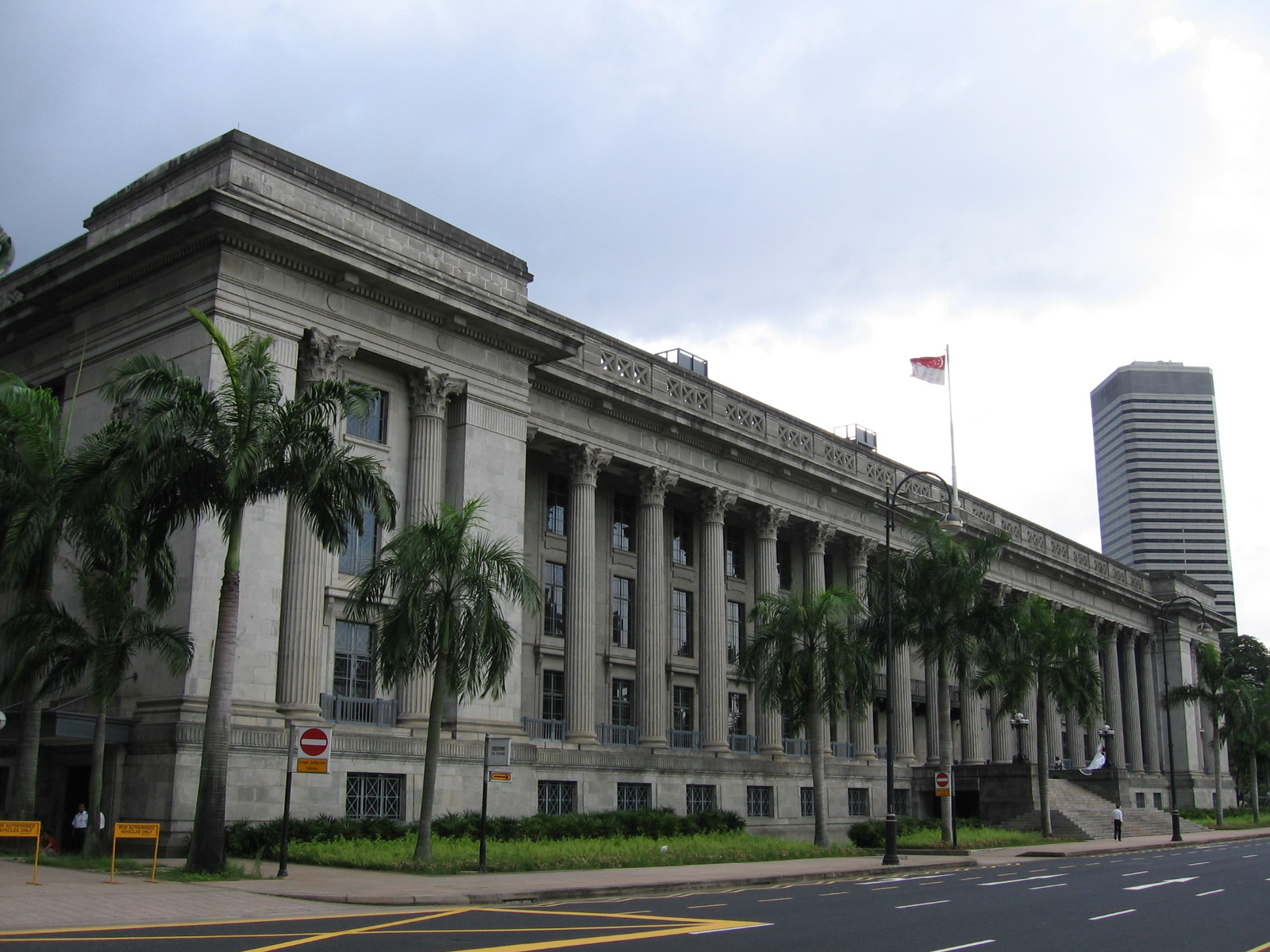
- Singapore City Hall
- Former names: Municipal Building; City Hall

General information
- Status: Occupied
- Architectural style: Neoclassical
- Location: Downtown Core, Singapore, 3 St Andrew's Road, Singapore 178958, Singapore
- Current tenants: National Gallery Singapore
- Construction started: 1926; 100 years ago
- Completed: 1929; 97 years ago
- Opened: 23 July 1929; 97 years ago
- Renovated: 1987, 2015
- Cost: $2 million
- Affiliation: National Heritage Board

Design and construction
- Architects: S. D. Meadows; Alexander Gordon
- Other designers: Rudolfo Nolli
- Main contractor: Perry and Co. (Overseas) Ltd

Renovating team
- Awards: Good Effort Award (1994); Urban Redevelopment Authority

National monument of Singapore
- Designated: 14 February 1992; 34 years ago
- Reference no.: 25

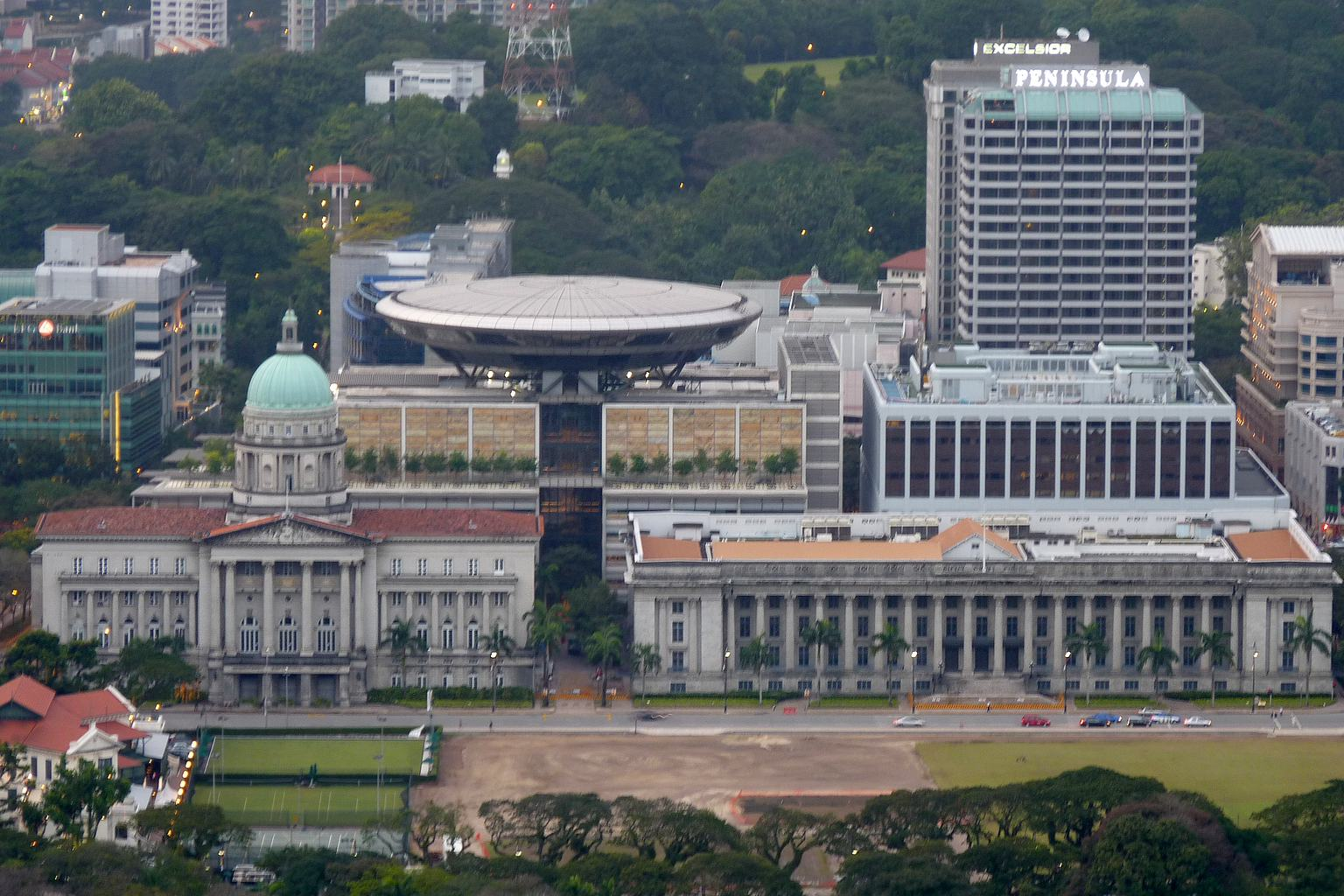
Aerial view of the old Supreme Court building (foreground left), new Supreme Court building (middle) and City Hall (foreground right).

The Former City Hall building in Singapore is a national monument gazetted on 14 February 1992. It can be found in front of the historical Padang and adjacent to the Former Supreme Court of Singapore, it was designed and built by the architects of the Municipal Commission of Singapore, A. Gordans and F. D. Meadows from 1926 to 1929. A flight of stairs takes visitors from the Corinthian colonnade to the main building. The building was constructed to replace several houses designed by architect G.D. Coleman. It was first known as the Municipal Building until 1951, when the town of Singapore was granted city status by King George VI.

== History ==
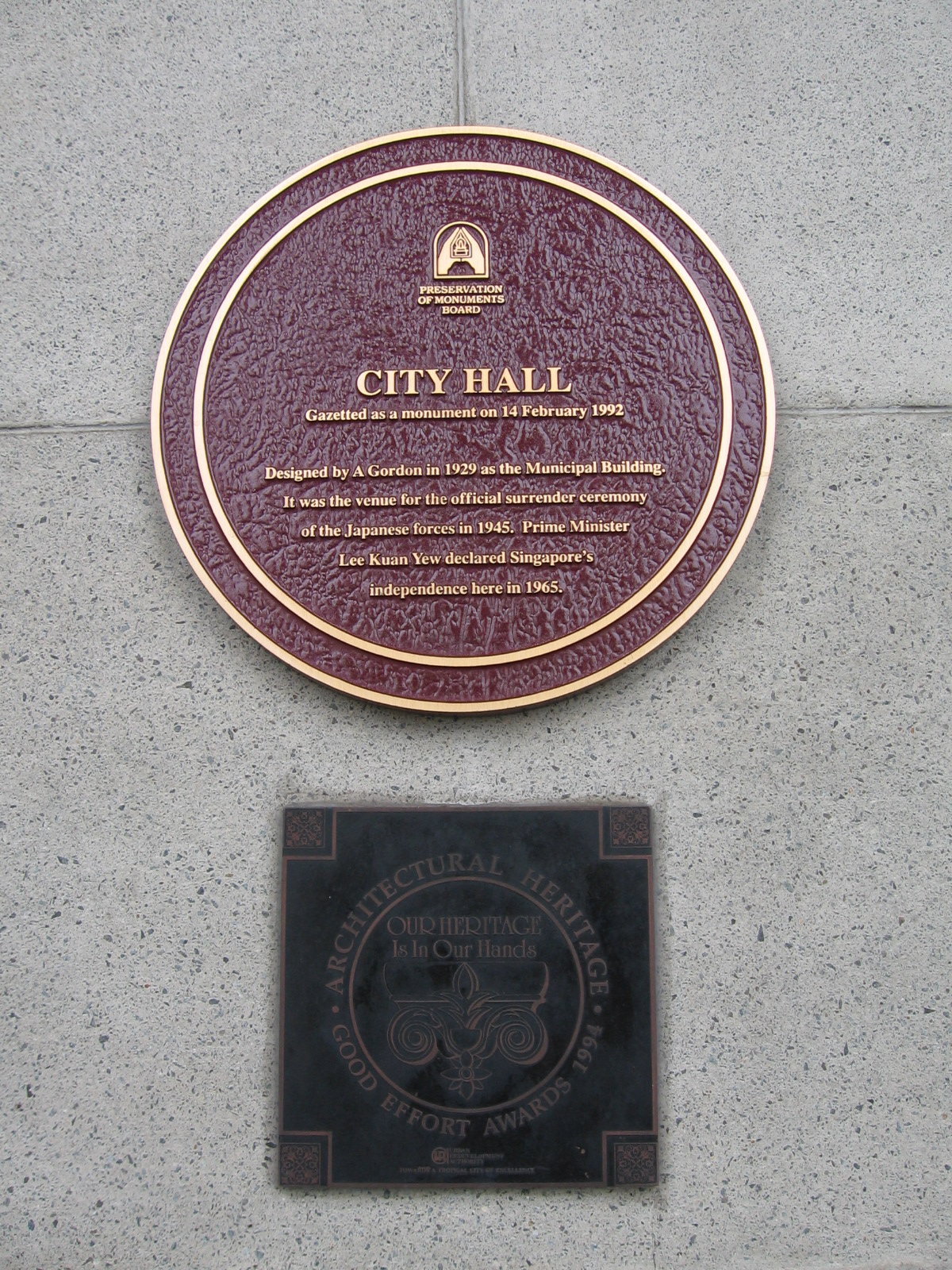
A plaque installed on the facade of the City Hall after it was gazetted as National Monument in 1992.

The Municipal Building was planned and designed for the Municipal Commission by the municipal architect S. D. Meadows, and then by Alexander Gordon, who took over the position in 1925. The London construction firm Perry and Co. (Overseas) Ltd. began construction in 1926 and it was completed in 1929. By April, the Municipal Commission had moved into its new home. Sir Hugh Clifford, the Governor of the Straits Settlements, then officially opened the new Municipal Building on 23 July 1929. During the Second World War, when the Japanese occupied Singapore, they managed civic issues from the Municipal Building. Political affairs were already being conducted in the building. In 1943, the leader of the Indian National Army, Subhas Chandra Bose, rallied for Japanese support to help India be independent of British rule at the Municipal Building. British prisoners-of-war were rounded up in front of the building to march to POW camps such as Changi Prison and Selarang. On 12 September 1945, the Imperial Japanese Army (IJA) official Seishirō Itagaki surrendered to Lord Louis Mountbatten in the building to end the Second World War in Singapore, 9 days after the surrender was signed. In 1951, it was renamed to its present name City Hall to mark the town of Singapore being granted city status by King George VI, and the transfer of functions of the Municipal Commission to the City Council of Singapore. At the time, the City of Singapore was the capital of the Crown Colony of Singapore. Previously, the town of Singapore had been the capital of the Straits Settlements, up until its abolition in 1946.

In 1959, then Prime Minister Lee Kuan Yew declared self-governance at City Hall. It was also the first time that the people of Singapore heard the new national anthem and saw their national flag. Lee and his eight cabinet ministers were then sworn into political office in the chamber of City Hall before the first Yang di-Pertuan Negara, Yusof bin Ishak, whose oath was taken at the City Hall as well. Lee Kuan Yew read out the Malaysia Proclamation at the City Hall in 1963, and declared that Singapore was no longer under British rule. The people celebrated the first Malaysia Day at the Padang which was outside the City Hall. When Singapore was no longer a part of Malaysia, The first National Day Parade was held there in 1966. The steps of the City Hall are also used as a VIP seating area when National Day Parades were held there.

In 1987, the building underwent a massive upgrade to allow the building to house governmental offices, the Public Service Commission and the Industrial Arbitration Court. In 1988, twelve courtrooms of the City Hall were transferred to the Supreme Court. This restoration work earned a Good Effort Award in 1994 by the Urban Redevelopment Authority. The City Hall was the place where Prime Minister Goh Chok Tong had his inauguration ceremony and the swearing-in of his cabinet in 1990. The building was also used for many government events over the years, it was used as a venue for the Singapore Biennale, and for the IMF and World Bank Meetings when it was held in Singapore in 2006.

Since 2015, the former City Hall, together with the adjacent Former Supreme Court Building, has been the location of the National Gallery Singapore.

== See also ==
- City Hall MRT station
- Supreme Court of Singapore
