= Four Million Smiles =

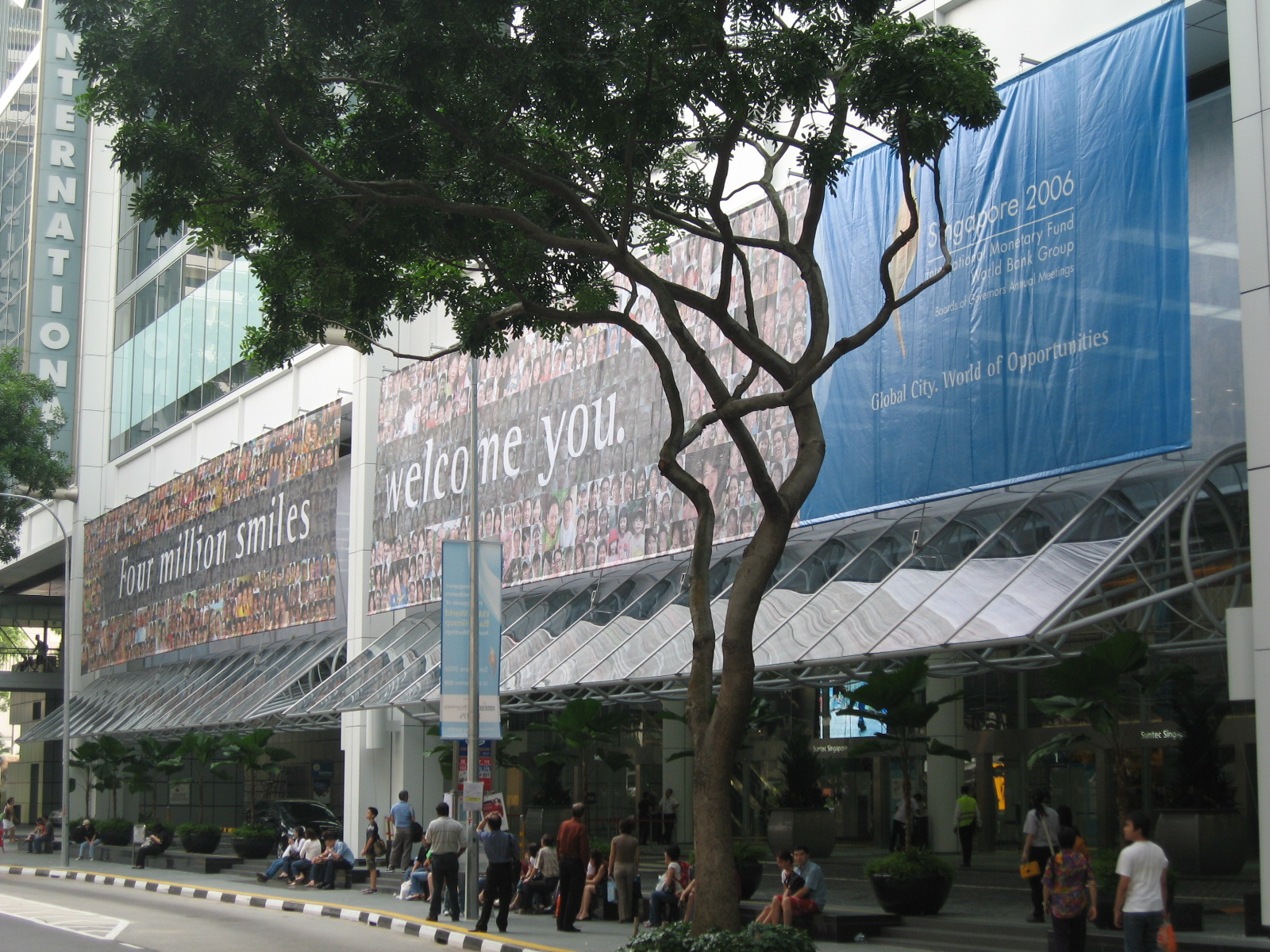
The Four Million Smiles banner outside Suntec Singapore International Convention and Exhibition Centre, location of the IMF/World Bank Meetings

Four Million Smiles was the theme of an advertising campaign in Singapore by the Singapore 2006 Organising Committee, sponsored by the government of Singapore. The advertising campaign encouraged Singaporeans to smile more in preparation for the 61st Annual Meetings of the International Monetary Fund, World Bank Group and their 16,000 delegates. It was launched by Prime Minister Lee Hsien Loong on 8 July 2006.

A mural was created to welcome the visitors. Singaporeans were encouraged to submit photographs of them smiling through an official website or by Multimedia Messaging Service. These were eventually compiled into the mural, and those submitting had a chance of winning several lucky draws.

While some agree that Singaporeans are often cold in public and there needs to be encouragement of more visible goodwill in society, others saw the campaign as a form of social control. Critics also argued that the campaign perpetuated racial discrimination and self-degradation of Singaporeans by encouraging them to smile in the presence of delegates just because they happen to be "ang mo" foreigners. This includes a Straits Times article featuring recruitment calls by escort agencies for young, athletic girls between 18 and 20 to offer themselves for the expected spike in demand for escort services, sparking outrage from women's rights organisations. As parodies, Four Million Frowns and 400 Frowns projects were started online, but the police arrested a man over the latter.
