= Singapore 2006 =

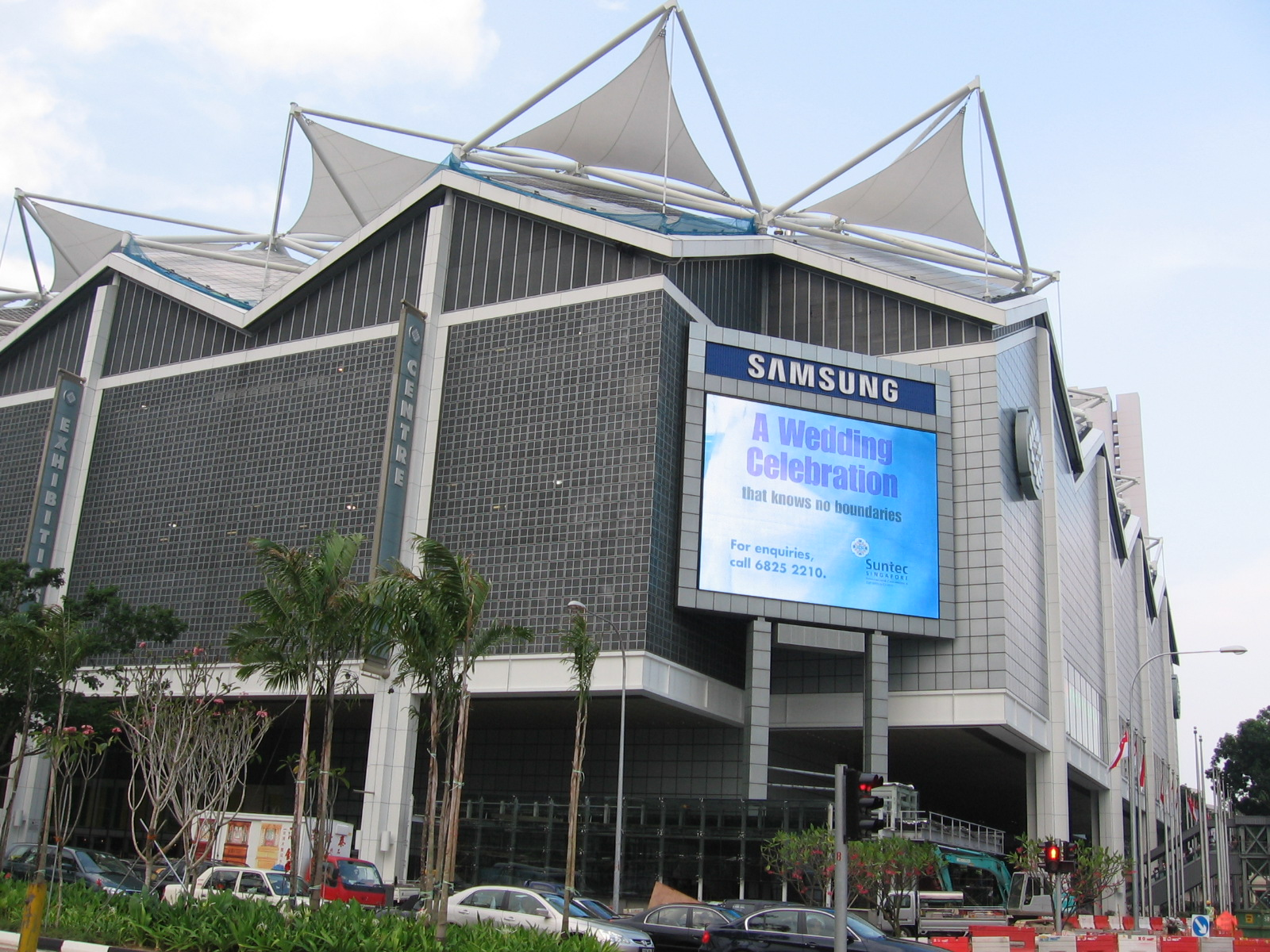
Suntec Singapore International Convention and Exhibition Centre is the main venue of the 2006 IMF/World Bank annual meetings.

Singapore 2006 was a group of several concurrent events that were held in Singapore in support of the 61st Annual Meetings of the Boards of Governors of the International Monetary Fund and the World Bank Group. The opening ceremony and plenary sessions for the main meetings took place from 19–20 September 2006 at the Suntec Singapore International Convention and Exhibition Centre (SSICEC) in Marina Centre. The ministers of G8, G10 and G24 coincided with the event on 16 September. Registration for event delegates began on 11 September 2006 at City Hall, and the three-day Program of Seminars from 16 September 2006 at the Pan Pacific Singapore. Other concurrent events at various venues included the Singapore Biennale 2006 (4 September – 12 November), the Raffles Forum 2006 (14–15 September), Indonesia Day (17 September) and the Global Emerging Markets Investors Forum and Networking Reception in (18 September).

Event organisers expected a turnout of about 16,000 delegates and observers, but saw a record 23,000 delegates and 300 finance ministers registering themselves, the largest turnout for an overseas annual meeting. It is the largest meeting in Singapore's history, and other meetings include the 117th IOC Session and the WTO Ministerial Conference 1996. Main topics of discussion were the prospects of recession and the risk to the global economy. The primary outcome was reform of the IMF system.

== Preparations ==
On 30 September 2002, Lim Hng Kiang who was then the Second Minister for Finance, Minister for Health and the Deputy Chairman for the Monetary Authority of Singapore, announced Singapore as the host of the annual meetings for 2006. The Memorandum of Understanding was signed on 23 September 2003 at Dubai International Convention Centre by Lim, International Monetary Fund managing director Horst Köhler, and president of the World Bank Group James Wolfensohn.

=== Venue and logistics ===
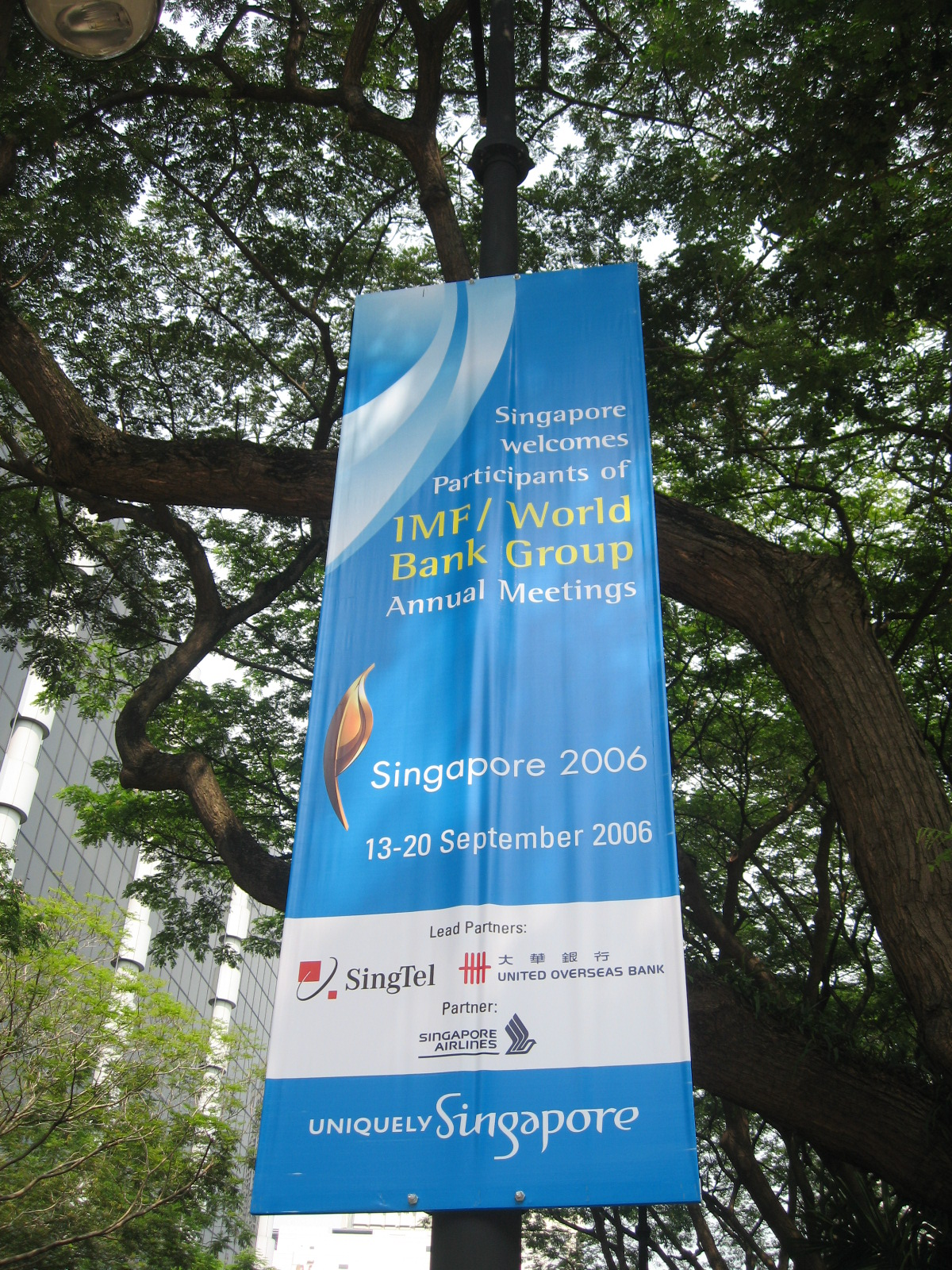
A typical banner found on the roads in the city centre of Singapore, promoting the event

Pico Art International, a local event marketing corporation, was assigned to prepare the event venue. Pico had participated in major past events such as the 117th IOC Session, 2006 Commonwealth Games and the 2004 Summer Olympics. They built over a thousand double storey offices in 35 days, or three office units per hour. The structures within the convention centre were taken down nine days after the meetings. These double storey offices were air-conditioned, equipped with lighting, telephones and internet connection. It had 41 staircases and five elevators. One thousand tons of steel, over 100,000 pieces of wall panels, 25,000 m² of carpeting, 32,000 pieces of ceiling boards, 3,000 lights and 15,000 pieces of furniture were needed for the construction of these offices.

The main venue, Suntec Singapore International Convention and Exhibition Centre, received a facelift with an upgraded lobby, entrance and a facade which was lighted at night. 100,000 flowers and shrubs were used to beautify the landscape around the area as well as other parts of the island, including Orchard Road, Suntec's vicinity as well as the East Coast Parkway. These plants included frangipani trees, fox palms and heliconias, as well as other types of plants, coming in different colours, shapes and sizes, planted along pavements and road dividers. This showcased the tropical plants of the island to the world as well. Flyovers and the City Hall undergone repainting and works to repave the areas near Suntec City were pushed forward to prepare for the annual meetings. Also, walkways have been resurfaced by the Land Transport Authority. At Singapore Changi Airport, posters were put around the terminals of the airport to welcome the delegates from different countries.

=== Publicity and logo ===
Logo of Singapore 2006

A campaign known as Four Million Smiles was launched in July 2006 by Prime Minister Lee Hsien Loong to prepare the service sector for the event. Lim Hwee Hwa is the minister appointed to lead the organising committee of the event.

The emblem for the 2006 annual meetings of the IMF and the World Bank Group was a stylised golden bud. According to the event organisers, the color gold represented finance and the bud represented potential for growth.

== Security ==
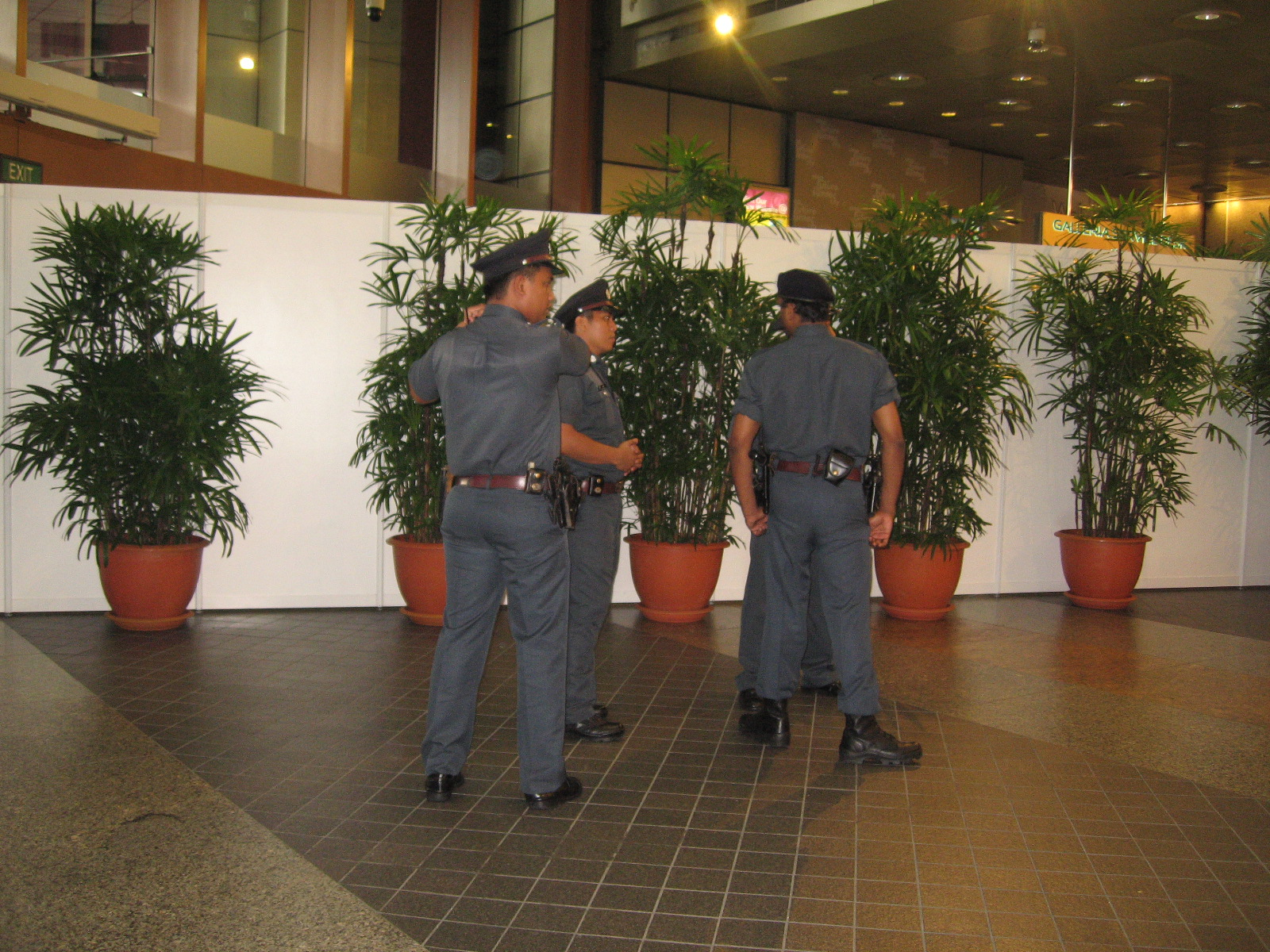
A group of CISCO auxiliary policemen patrolling the areas inside Suntec City Mall

The Singaporean government maintained tight security in and around the conference due to concerns about terrorism and violent protests. The Singapore Police Force was entrusted with planning and implementing security arrangements, with the support of private security companies Aetos and CISCO Security as auxiliary police. Security arrangements included oversight of the main venue's operations, border security, as well as island-wide operations.

Over 10,000 police officers, including reserve members of the Singaporean national service and officers from the Volunteer Special Constabulary, were deployed at event venues and the Marina Centre area. Officers from the Gurkha Contingent and the Key Installation Protection Unit were deployed to patrol the vicinity and at entrances to barricaded areas.

Security for Suntec City and the convention centre were handled by the Singapore Police Force and CISCO Security. Roads leading to the conference centre were temporarily barricaded and traffic police deployed at key junctions to direct traffic. The SSICEC, several car park entrances to the Suntec City mall, and the overhead bridge from CityLink Mall to Suntec City were all closed to public during the convention. A security office was temporarily constructed at the main entrance of Suntec City Mall with metal detectors and x-ray machines. These machines have also been installed at SICEC for the delegates and CSO protestors.

== Leadup to conference ==
Road closures in the vicinity of event venues came into effect on the night of 10 September 2006, with police presence increased substantially within SICEC and in adjoining hotels. There was a notable drop in traffic volume around the area even during the morning peak hours, and traffic remained relatively smooth. Meeting delegates commenced officially at City Hall on 11 September 2006, 0800 hours (SST).

Reportedly, approximately 200 to 300 technical and maintenance crew members at SICEC were unable to access their workplaces due to issues with entry passes. According to a worker who spoke to the media anonymously, some temporary passes had expired without being replaced. Other workers did not receive permanent passes despite correct paperwork. Other passes were printed with errors.

Reportedly, shops and restaurants at Suntec City Mall inside the convention centre saw a large drop in business after the area was secured on the evening before the convention. Nearby Marina Square mall was also affected. To promote sales during the convention, Suntec City created promotions for shoppers and delegates alike.

== Meetings ==
Meetings and other events officially commenced on 13 September, with 23,000 delegates registered to attend. At the Organization of the Petroleum Exporting Countries seminar, then-IMF chief Rodrigo de Rato criticised attempts made by some wealthy nations to reduce fuel prices, instead advocating for a price increase to reflect scarcity and high crude oil prices worldwide. The IMF warned that global markets faced a possible recession, including an economic downturn in the United States, falling home prices, further surge in oil prices, interest rate rises to contain inflationary pressures.

On 14 September, the inaugural Raffles Forum was held at Raffles City Convention Centre, with one plenary session on this day. At SSICEC, there was a World Economic Outlook meeting. The IMF predicted that the growth in the economy will increase, but there could be global imbalances.

On 15 September, the United Kingdom's group of delegates arrived in Singapore, including Chancellor of the Exchequer as well as chairman of the International Monetary and Financial Committee (IMFC) Gordon Brown and Mervyn King, the Governor of the Bank of England. There were also press briefings by both the IMF and the World Bank Group.

On 16 September, the G7 finance ministers met at the Raffles Hotel to discuss the world's economy. The three-day Program of Seminars commenced, attended by private sector representatives, government delegates, civil society representatives and senior officials from the International Monetary Fund and the World Bank. 161 speakers discussed topics included economic growth, the future of China and India, regional issues and faster economic growth of the Pacific Islands, ageing population in Asia, petrol prices, preventing a financial crisis, oil trade, poverty, trade agreements and other Asian issues. The G24 ministers meeting was held at SSICEC.

17 September marked the second day of the Program of Seminars, as well a meeting of the IMFC. Several African finance ministers, Gordon Brown, and de Rato held press conferences at SSICEC. The World Bank announced that they will provide a US$15 million grant to combat bird flu in Indonesia. Seven lenders including the IMF and the World Bank signed an anti-corruption agreement.

Prime Minister Lee Hsien Loong and Senior Minister Goh Chok Tong attended meetings on 18 September. It was the final day of the Program of Seminars. The IMF approved a plan to give more powers and voting rights to China, Mexico, South Korea and Turkey, with 90.6% support. World Bank president Paul Wolfowitz called for support for developing nations, and the IMF and World Bank called for anti-corruption measures in those countries.

Plenary sessions commenced on 20 September with an opening ceremony hosted by Goh Chok Tong at Esplanade – Theatres on the Bay. 5,000 official delegates were hosted at an official reception that included performances by local groups and a multimedia presentation about Asian identity called "Diaspora". The IMF and World Bank heads agreed on the need for systematic reform to empower developing countries. IMF adopted a multilateral consultation process to address global payment imbalances.

On the final day, 20 September, more than 3,000 people were in attendance. During the event, "the second stage of reforms to revise the quota formula" were approved by IMF representatives.

== List of venues ==
- Suntec Singapore International Convention and Exhibition Centre (main venue)
- City Hall (registration)
- Esplanade - Theatres on the Bay (official opening ceremony)
- The Pan Pacific Singapore (seminars)
- Istana (banquet for governors and spouses)
- Raffles Hotel (G8 meeting)
- Raffles City Convention Centre (Raffles Forum)
- Mount Faber (the Jewel Box; welcome tea for delegates' spouses)
- Asian Civilisations Museum, Empress Place (lunch for governors spouses)
- Shangri-La Hotel Singapore (Institute of International Finance annual membership meeting and dinner)

== Activism and demonstrations ==
Singaporean authorities denied entry of several accredited civil service organisations (CSO) representatives whom they regarded as "troublemakers", despite appeals from the IMF and World Bank to permit them entry. On 11 September, when civic activists began arriving in Singapore, 28 activists were denied entry and had to leave the country. Police stated they had been denied entry for their involvement in previous violent protests. The IMF and World Bank stated that they had secured permission for accredited activists and protestors to attend the meetings, and they considered this denial a breach of that agreement. The convention's organising committee later condemned the restrictions as "authoritarian". Two unaccredited Filipino activists were deported on 13 September, and one Indian national was deported on 14 September. On 15 September 2006, part-way through the conference, the Singaporean government announced that 22 of the banned would be allowed entry. On 20 September, they stated that their changed stance had been a result of an internal review and was not a reaction to the IMF/World Bank criticism.

As with the Dubai 2003 meetings, outdoor demonstrations were not permitted, as they are illegal under Singaporean law. The government rejected requests to suspend the prohibitions for security reasons. Demonstrations from representatives of registered CSOs were granted permission to demonstrate in a small area on the ground floor of Suntec Singapore. Police pushed the start date of these demonstrations from 11 September to 13 September. The One Campaign in Singapore produced videos about world poverty and anticipated playing them at screens at the convention centre. An activist from Action Aid International held a solo protest on 14 September, and her group staged a silent protest the day after. Thirty people from Global Call to Action Against Poverty wore white t-shirts and gags with "no voice" written on them during a protest on 15 September. Some CSOs accused the IMF/World Bank of deliberately choosing Singapore to host the meetings because of its authoritarian reputation.

On 6 September 2006, the Singapore Democratic Party (SDP) announced plans for a protest on 16 September, called the Empower Singaporeans Rally and March. It would include members of the Singapore opposition including the SDP. On 11 September, it was reported that the police were investigating the planned rally. The police also reportedly denied two applications for the planned protest and confiscated leaflets about it that were handed out at Raffles City. The Rally began as planned at 11 am at the Speakers' Corner at Hong Lim Park, but was denied permission to travel to other planned stops at Parliament House, Suntec City, and the Istana. SDP member Chee Soon Juan gave a speech at the parkk. On 17 September, the protesters announced that they would continue their protest until the morning of 19 September, after Prime Minister Lee Hsien Loong's speech before the WB-IMF meeting.

To circumvent the Singaporean ban, approximately 1,000 delegates from various organisations planned to hold outdoor demonstrations from 11–18 September in Batam, Indonesia. Indonesian law permits outdoor demonstration as long as authorities are informed three days in advance. Indonesian CSOs opposed the protests as they believed they would deter investment in the country. Indonesian authorities were reportedly not supportive of the planned demonstrations, and city police advised organisers that their demonstration would not be permitted for economic, political, and security reasons. On 11 September, Indonesian police granted a permit for a three-day indoor forum in Batam, but refused to allow outdoor demonstrations.

== Impact ==
A survey amongst delegates found a high satisfaction level with regards to the efficiency of event organisation, and of Singapore as a whole.

== See also ==
- Annual Meetings of the International Monetary Fund and the World Bank Group
- Economy of Singapore
- Four Million Smiles
