= Direct, indirect, and induced employment =

Investments into an industry or project can produce temporary and long-term employment. The resulting jobs are typically categorized as being one of three types. A direct job is employment created to fulfill the demand for a product or service. An indirect job is a job that exists to produce the goods and services needed by the workers with direct jobs. Indirect employment includes the things need direct on the job as well as jobs produced because of the worker's needs (e.g., uniforms). Employment created by the additional personal spending (e.g., eating at a restaurant) by both direct and indirect workers is classified as an induced job.

Projects may produce temporary and long-term jobs. Construction and installation jobs may be temporary. Operations and maintenance jobs tend to be long term.

== Examples ==
Project	Direct jobs	Indirect jobs	Induced jobs
Use wind turbines	Employees manufacturing wind turbines	Employees at a steel mill that supplies the wind turbine factory; Employees producing energy used by the steel mill; Employees at a factory that makes the screws used in wind turbines	Restaurant staff; Child care workers; Grocery store jobs; Clothing store jobs; Recreation and entertainment jobs
Build a water treatment facility	Construction workers building the facility; Employees operating equipment at the facility	Employees at a factory that makes chemicals used at the facility; Workers who wash the facility's uniforms at an industrial laundry	Restaurant staff; Child care workers; Grocery store jobs; Clothing store jobs; Recreation and entertainment jobs
Tourism	Service job selling tickets to a park	Employees at fast-food restaurant; Cashiers at retail stores; Hotel employees	Restaurant staff; Child care workers; Grocery store jobs; Clothing store jobs; Recreation and entertainment jobs
Retrofitting buildings to be energy efficient	Construction job to install new heating system	Employees who manufacture building supplies; Employees who assemble heating systems	Restaurant staff; Child care workers; Grocery store jobs; Clothing store jobs; Recreation and entertainment jobs

== Efficiency of job production ==
Investments in some projects or industries are more efficient at producing direct and indirect jobs. For example, investing US$1,000,000 in the petroleum industry produces fewer direct and indirect jobs than investing the same amount of money in renewable energy or energy efficiency.

A special economic zone produces fewer indirect jobs if it is isolated from the country's main economy, and more if it is well integrated. For example, the special economic zone in the Dominican Republic provided 166,000 formal direct jobs plus 250,000 indirect jobs in 2017.
