= Aetos Security Management =

Auxiliary police force in Singapore

Coordinates: 1°19′49.26″N 103°50′11.84″E

AETOS Holdings Pte Ltd
- Type: Subsidiary
- Industry: Company police/Security services
- Founded: 31 March 2004, through the merger of auxiliary police units from PSA Corporation, ST Kinetics and Changi International Airport Services (31 March 2004; 22 years ago)
- Headquarters: Singapore
- Key people: Jerry See (Senior Executive Director); Gerald Lim (Commander AETOS APF)
- Number of employees: 3,000 (2016); 4,300 (2018)
- Parent: Surbana Jurong
- Website: www.aetos.com.sg

AETOS Holdings is a security solutions provider based in Singapore. It is a member of the Surbana Jurong Group and was established on 31 March 2004 through the merger of three auxiliary police forces.

== History ==
Since its inception, AETOS has integrated the auxiliary police forces of Changi International Airport Services, PSA Corporation, and ST Kinetics as part of a consolidation initiative led by Temasek Holdings.

In 2007, the company participated in a joint security exercise at the Brani Container Terminal alongside PSA Singapore Terminals, the Singapore Police Force, and the Ministry of Defence to simulate a response to a security incident.

On 13 October 2016, AETOS was acquired by Surbana Jurong, a Singaporean government-owned consultancy focused on infrastructure and urban development.

In 2016, due to recruitment challenges among Malaysian and Singaporean nationals, the company began recruiting Taiwanese nationals for auxiliary police roles. In 2018, several Taiwanese officers were deployed to land checkpoints alongside Singaporean staff. Radio Taiwan International reported that some recruits faced job-related stress at their assigned posts.

On 26 January 2018, AETOS opened its new headquarters at 5 Corporation Drive, Jurong West, which includes a command centre, indoor shooting ranges, and a cash processing centre.

In January 2019, an AETOS officer stationed at the Woodlands Checkpoint was found dead with a gunshot wound to the head.

In September 2019, AETOS signed a teaming agreement with TRD Singapore to provide countermeasure services against unmanned aerial vehicles (UAVs) in Singapore. In November, the company signed an agreement with COSEM Safety & Security Services to provide integrated security and safety consultancy.

On 15 April 2021, an AETOS officer was arrested for the alleged armed robbery of a lender using a Taurus Model 85 revolver that he had reportedly brought unlawfully after reporting for duty.

== Company ==
In 2006, AETOS Security Management established two subsidiaries, AETOS Security Consultants and AETOS Security Training and Consultancy, to support its unarmed security, training, and consultancy operations.

In 2015, the company was restructured into AETOS Holdings Pte Ltd, comprising four subsidiaries: AETOS Security Management Pte Ltd (auxiliary police force), AETOS Guard Services (unarmed security), AETOS Training Academy, and AETOS Technology and Solutions.

=== Personnel ===
The company's first general manager was Andrew Tan (2004–2005), followed by Kelvin Tan (2005–2008). The position was retitled as executive director in 2008 when Chua Chin Kiat assumed the role. James Tan Chan Seng, formerly the Commissioner of the Singapore Civil Defence Force, served as CEO from 2011 to 2019.

On 27 March 2019, Alfred Fox was appointed CEO. Quek Poh Huat, who oversaw the integration of the three original auxiliary police forces, stepped down as chairman and was succeeded by Chiang Chie Foo.

On 1 May 2024, Jerry See was appointed Senior Executive Director, succeeding Alfred Fox, who transitioned to the role of Chief People and Culture Officer at SJ Group.

==== Requirements ====
Candidates must pass background checks before participating in a seven-week residential training programme. Those with prior law enforcement experience undergo an abbreviated three-week residential training programme.

=== Training ===
Prior to the opening of the Jurong West headquarters in 2018, AETOS recruits conducted firearms training at the Old Police Academy.

=== Corporate social responsibility ===
From 1 April 2018 to 31 March 2019, the company was a listed donor for Esplanade – Theatres on the Bay.

== Organizational structure ==
AETOS employs officers from the police force, military, and public service. Armed and unarmed officers are deployed to secure Singapore's airports, ports, strategic installations, and various regional businesses. They also provide security for events such as the Marina Bay Singapore Countdown, Singapore Grand Prix, Singapore Air show, and the 2015 Southeast Asian Games.

== Uniform ==
Upon its incorporation on 1 April 2004, AETOS officers initially wore the uniforms of their predecessor forces: Port of Singapore Authority Police (PSAP), Singapore Technologies Kinetics Police (STKP), and Changi International Airport Services Police (CIASP).

Following government directives to differentiate auxiliary police from the Singapore Police Force (SPF), uniforms were updated to a poly-viscose material in a corporate "tartan blue". New buttons and badges incorporating the AETOS logo replaced designs that resembled SPF insignia.

Historically, AETOS officers wore uniforms similar to the SPF due to their former affiliation. Because of this similarity, the general public often could not distinguish auxiliary officers from regular police without scrutiny. Following uniform reviews, auxiliary forces were required to adopt distinctive features. AETOS retained metallic cap badges and collar lapels while the SPF transitioned to embroidered versions. AETOS officers may also wear box caps depending on their deployment.

== Deployments ==
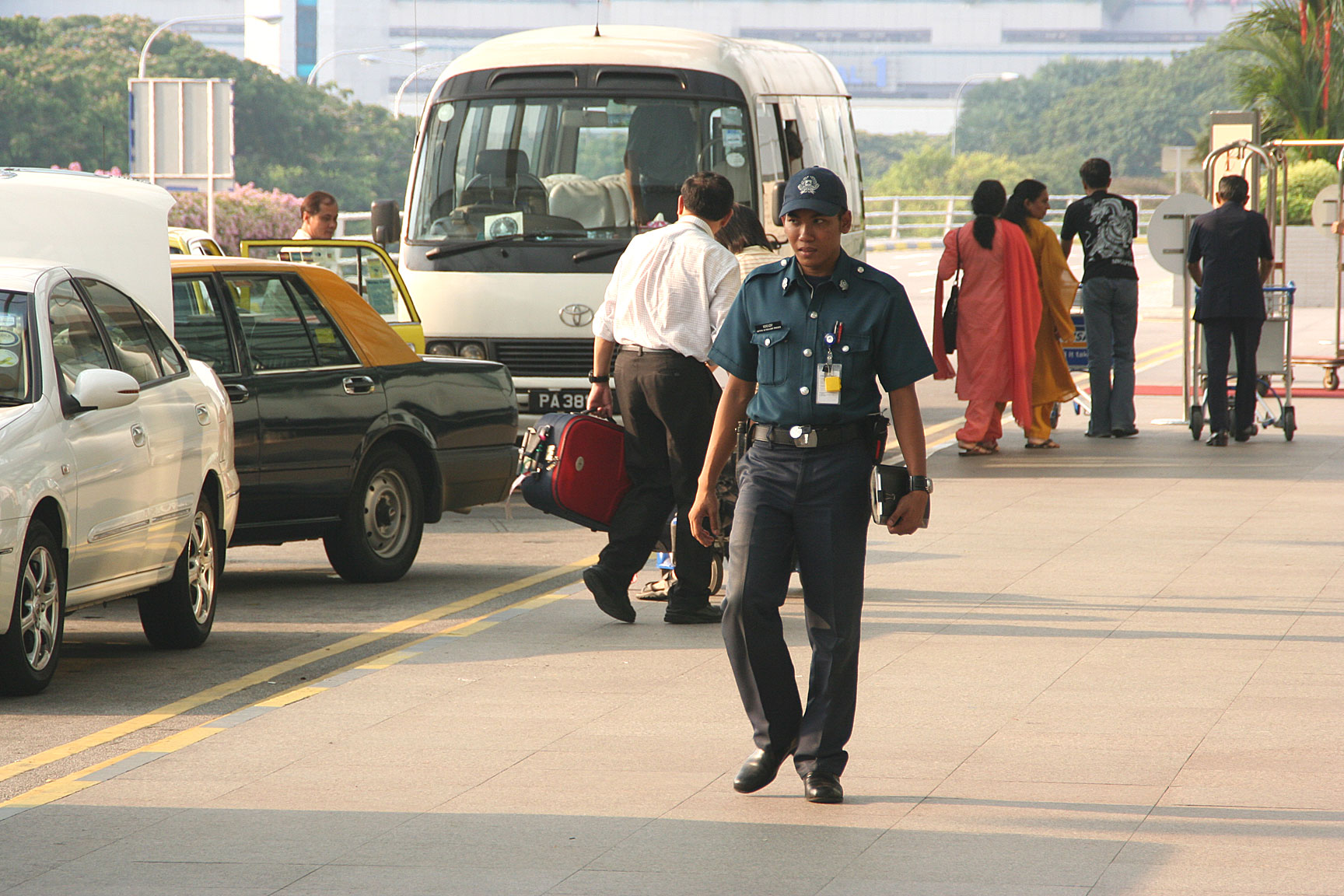
An AETOS auxiliary police officer stationed outside Terminal 2, Singapore Changi Airport

AETOS security professionals are deployed at sites including:

- PSA Corporation
- Immigration & Checkpoints Authority
- Esplanade – Theatres on the Bay
- Singapore Cruise Centre
- Tanah Merah Ferry Terminal
- Police Cantonment Complex
- Singapore Changi Airport (providing airside security services)
- Woodlands Checkpoint
- Jurong Island Checkpoint
- Tan Tock Seng Hospital
- Changi Prison
- Institute of Mental Health (Singapore)

=== Events ===
AETOS provides security for major events, including:

- Marina Bay Countdown Celebration
- Chingay Parade
- Singapore F1 Grand Prix
- Singapore Air show
- SEA Games 2015
- Shangri-La Dialogue
- National Day Parade
