= Annual Meetings of the International Monetary Fund and the World Bank Group =

Annual global economic conference

The IMF and World Bank meet each autumn in what is officially known as the Annual Meetings of the International Monetary Fund and the World Bank Group and each spring in the Spring Meetings of the International Monetary Fund and the World Bank Group. Names of the two groups are alternated each year so a different one has top billing.

The autumn meetings are customarily held in Washington, D.C., United States for two consecutive years, and in another member country in the third year. At the spring and annual meetings there are meetings of the World Bank-IMF Development Committee and the International Monetary and Financial Committee (IMFC). Each committee is made of up ministers or central bank governors. There are equivalent numbers and the same constituency systems as is used at the Executive boards of the institutions. At the annual meetings, the governors of the World Bank and IMF also meet in plenary sessions.

Until the 2008 financial crisis, both the spring and annual meetings were preceded by meetings of the G7 finance ministers. During the 2008 financial crisis, for the first time the 2008 annual meetings included a meeting of G20 finance ministers. The 2009 annual meetings witnessed the last meetings of the G7 finance ministers, with all future spring and annual meetings accompanied by G20 finance minister meetings. The spring and annual meetings also include meetings of the finance ministers of the G-24 group of developing countries.

Since the mid-1990s, these meetings have centerpoints for anti-globalization movement protests. There have been complete bans on outdoor protests in the 2003 meetings in Dubai, United Arab Emirates as well as the 2006 meeting in Singapore, where only indoor demonstrations within a designated area is permitted. Some argue that such bans are out of safety concerns, while others consider them an effort to curb dissent. These measures have led to retaliatory actions by NGOs who targeted the organisers, as well as the IMF and World Bank for allegedly picking venues which are known to impose such restrictions.

== List of Annual Meetings ==
Year	Date	Venue
1947		London, United Kingdom
1950		Paris, France
1952		Mexico City, Mexico
1955		Istanbul, Turkey
1958		New Delhi, India
1961		Vienna, Austria
1964		Tokyo, Japan
1967		Rio de Janeiro, Brazil
1970		Copenhagen, Denmark
1973		Nairobi, Kenya
1976		Manila, Philippines
1979		Belgrade, Socialist Federal Republic of Yugoslavia
1982		Toronto, Ontario, Canada
1985		Seoul, South Korea
1988		Berlin, Federal Republic of Germany
1991		Bangkok, Thailand
1994		Madrid, Spain
1996	September 26 to October 3	Sheraton Washington Hotel, Washington, D.C., United States
1997	September 17 to 25	Hong Kong Convention and Exhibition Centre, Hong Kong, People's Republic of China
1998	September 29 to October 8	Marriott Wardman Park Hotel, Washington, D.C., United States
1999	September 25 to 30	Headquarters of the International Monetary Fund, Washington, D.C., United States
2000	September 19 to 28	Prague, Czech Republic
2001	November 17 to 18	World Bank Group/International Monetary Fund Headquarters, Washington, D.C., United States; Ottawa, Ontario, Canada (meetings of the International Monetary and Financial Committee and the Development Committee)
2002	September 29	World Bank Group/International Monetary Fund Headquarters, Washington, D.C., United States
2003	September 23 to 24	Dubai, United Arab Emirates
2004	October 3	Washington, D.C., United States
2005	September 24 to 25	Washington, D.C., United States
2006	September 13 to 20	Suntec Singapore International Convention and Exhibition Centre, Singapore
2007	October 20 to 22	Washington, D.C., United States
2008	October 13	Washington, D.C., United States
2009	October 6 to 7	Istanbul, Turkey
2010	October 8 to 10	Washington, D.C., United States
2011	September 23 to 25	Washington, D.C., United States
2012	October 9 to 14	Tokyo, Japan
2013	October 11 to 13	George Washington University, Washington, D.C., United States
2014	October 10 to 12	George Washington University, Washington, D.C., United States
2015	October 9 to 11	Lima, Peru
2016	October 7 to 9	George Washington University, Washington, D.C., United States
2017	October 13 to 15	George Washington University, Washington, D.C., United States
2018	October 8 to 14	Nusa Dua, Bali, Indonesia
2019	October 14 to 20	Washington, D.C., United States
2019	October 12 to 18	Washington, D.C., United States
2021	October 11 to 17	virtual
2022	October 10 to 16	Washington, D.C., United States
2023	October 9 to 15	Marrakesh, Morocco
2024	October 21 to 26	Washington, D.C., United States
2025	October 13 to 18	Washington, D.C., United States
2026	October 12 to 18	Queen Sirikit National Convention Center, Bangkok, Thailand

== See also ==
- 1988 IMF/World Bank protests
