= Dnata Singapore =

Aircraft ground handling provider

dnata Singapore Pte Ltd
- Industry: Ground Handling
- Founded: 1977; 49 years ago, in Singapore
- Headquarters: Changi, Singapore
- Products: Aviation Services
- Parent: dnata
- Website: www.dnata.sg

dnata Singapore Pte Ltd is a ground handling provider at Singapore Changi Airport, providing ground, passenger and cargo handling services, in-flight catering and security services to 69 scheduled and 45 non-scheduled airlines.

Ground handling operations began in Singapore in December 1977 with the incorporation of Changi International Airport Services (CIAS) as a joint venture between the Port of Singapore Authority and five airlines, namely Air France, China Airlines, Garuda Indonesian Airways, KLM and Lufthansa.

In September 2004, CIAS was acquired by the dnata Group, a company based in Dubai with Temasek Holdings retaining shareholding. It was subsequently rebranded as dnata in August 2011.
