= 2024 in architecture =

The year 2024 in architecture involved various significant architectural events and new buildings.

== Events ==
- January – The Arch of Reunification in North Korea is demolished within a week of Kim Jong Un calling for it.
- August – Removal of non-structural columns in a refurbishment of the Sainsbury Wing of London's National Gallery reveals a note from the building's sponsor John, Lord Sainsbury (d. 2022) indicating that he disagreed with the building's original architects (Robert Venturi and Denise Scott Brown, 1991) over their inclusion in the first place.
- November 29 – Interior restoration of the Notre-Dame de Paris cathedral after the 2019 fire is first revealed publicly.

== Buildings and structures ==
=== Albania ===
- Mixed-use skyscrapers in Tirana:
  - The Book Building, designed by 51N4E, completed.
  - Downtown One, designed by MVRDV, official opening scheduled.
  - Eyes of Tirana, designed by Henning Larsen Architects, completion expected.
  - Vertical Forest Tirana, designed by Stefano Boeri, expected completion in third quarter of 2024.

== France ==
- The Simone Veil Bridge in Bordeaux designed by OMA/Rem Koolhaas.

=== Malaysia ===
- Merdeka 118 in Kuala Lumpur, the second-tallest structure and the second-tallest building in the world, designed by Fender Katsalidis in association with RSP KL, officially opened on 10 January 2024.

=== Poland ===
- Museum of Modern Art, Warsaw, designed by Thomas Phifer and Partners, opened on 25 October 2024.

=== United States ===
- Populus Denver (hotel), designed by Studio Gang, opened in October.

== Awards ==
- Aga Khan Award for Architecture –
- AIA Gold Medal – David Lake and Ted Flat
- Driehaus Architecture Prize for New Classical Architecture –
- European Union Prize for Contemporary Architecture (Mies van der Rohe Prize) – Study Pavilion on the campus of the Technical University of Braunschweig (Gustav Düsing and Büro Max Hacke)
- Pritzker Architecture Prize – Riken Yamamoto
- RIBA Royal Gold Medal – Lesley Lokko
- Stirling Prize – Elizabeth line, London

== Exhibitions ==
- September 30 until March 16, 2025 – "Materialized Space: The Architecture of Paul Rudolph" at the Metropolitan Museum of Art in New York City.

== Deaths ==
- January 6 - Kurt W. Forster, 88, Swiss architecture historian and teacher (born 1935)
- January 18 - Heinz Tesar, 84, Austrian architect, best known for his church and museum architecture (born 1939)
- February 5 - Peter Kulka, 86, German architect (born 1937)
- February 16 - Kendrick Bangs Kellogg, 89, American architect (born 1934)
- February 21 - Altuğ Çinici, 89, Turkish architect (born 1935)
- February 24 - Bill Alington, 94, New Zealand modernist architect (born 1929)
- February 24 - John Miller, 93, British architect (born 1930)
- March 2 - Antoine Predock, 87, American architect (born 1936)
- March 6 - Ray Grenald, 96, American architectural lighting designer (born 1928)
- March 9 - Lynn Kinnear, 64, British landscape architect (born 1960)
- March 9 - José Oubrerie, 91, French architect, author and educator (born 1932)
- March 26 - L. Jane Hastings, 96, American architect (born 1928)
- April 3 - Gaetano Pesce, 84, Italian architect and designer (born 1939)
- April 6 - Italo Rota, 70, Italian architect (born 1953)
- April 9 - Karl Momen, 90, Swedish architect, painter and sculptor (born 1934)
- April 29 - Ben Weese, 94, American architect (born 1929)
- April 30 - Renato De Fusco, 94, Italian architectural historian (born 1929)
- May 2 - Adolpho Lindenberg, 99, Brazilian civil engineer, architect and writer (born 1924)
- May 7 - Barbara Stauffacher Solomon, 95, American landscape architect and graphic designer (born 1928)
- May 20 - Aida Cruz, 101, Filipino architect (born 1922)
- May 20 - Bertus Mulder, 95, Dutch architect (born 1929)
- May 22 - Diana Cabeza, 69, Argentine architect and designer (born 1954)
- May 22 - Mimoza Nestorova-Tomić, 94, Macedonian architect, planner, and urban designer (born 1929)
- May 27 - Alan Choe, 93, Singaporean architect and urban planner (born 1931)
- May 30 - Pekka Salminen, 86, Finnish architect (born 1937)
- June 6 - Fumihiko Maki, 95, Japanese architect (born 1928)
- June 16 - Paul Chemetov, 95, French architect and urbanist (born 1928)
- June 24 - Alexandros Tombazis, 85, Greek architect (born 1939)
- July 22 - Maarja Nummert, 80, Estonian architect (born 1944)
- August 7 - Friedrich Möbius, 96, German art and architectural historian (born 1928)
- August 18 - Baruj Salinas, 89, Cuban-American contemporary visual artist and architect (born 1935)
- August 31 - Sir Harold Marshall, 92, New Zealand acoustician and architect (born 1931)
- September 4 - Colin Fournier, 79, British architect (born 1944)
- September 21 - Paola Marella, 61, Italian architect and television presenter (born 1963)
- September 30 - David Aradeon, 90, Nigerian-American architect (born 1933)
- October 2 - Christopher Charles Benninger, 82, American-born Indian architect and urban planner (born 1942)
- October 2 - Roger K. Lewis, 83, American architect and urban planner (born 1941)
- October 18 - Joseph Rykwert, 98, Polish-born British architectural historian (born 1926)
- October 19 - Sim Van der Ryn, 89, Dutch-born American architect (born 1935)
- November 4 - Victor A. Lundy, 101, American modernist architect (Warm Mineral Springs Motel) (born 1923)
- November 7 - Sergio Los, 90, Italian architect and educator (born 1934)
- November 8 - Kazimierz Ferenc, 80, Polish architect and politician (born 1944)
- November 13 - Trond Eliassen, 102, Norwegian architect (born 1922)
- November 14 - Adolfo Moran, 70–71, Spanish architect (born 1953)
- November 26 - Jahangir Darvish, 91, Iranian architect (born 1933)
- December 16 - Yoshio Taniguchi, 87, Japanese architect (MoMA) (born 1937)
- December 18 - Friedrich St. Florian, 91, Austrian-American architect (World War II Memorial, Providence Place) (born 1932)
- December 20 - Turgut Toydemir, 86, Turkish architect (born 1938)
- December 26 - Richard Gibson, 89, British architect (born 1935)

== See also ==
- Timeline of architecture
