= Populus (disambiguation) =

Populus is genus of plants.

Populus may also refer to:

- Populus (geomancy), a geomantic figure
- Populus Ltd, a market research company
- Populus Denver, a hotel in Denver, Colorado
- Populus Seattle, a hotel in Seattle, Washington

== See also ==
- Populous (disambiguation)
- Poplar (disambiguation)
- Popular (disambiguation)
