= Poplar (disambiguation) =

Poplar is a plant species in the genus Populus, which also includes aspen and cottonwood.

Poplar may also refer to:

== Plants ==
- Poplars:
  - Black poplar (Populus nigra)
  - Carolina or Canadian poplar, Populus × canadensis
  - Grey poplar (Populus × canescens)
  - White poplar
    - Populus alba, native to Eurasia
    - Populus grandidentata, bigtooth aspen
    - Populus tremuloides, American aspen
- Tulip poplars, Liriodendron
  - Yellow poplar or tulip poplar (Liriodendron tulipifera)
  - Liriodendron chinense, Chinese tulip poplar

== Places ==
Canada

- Poplar, Ontario, a community in the township of Burpee and Mills
- Poplar Creek, British Columbia, a ghost town

United Kingdom

- Poplar, London
  - Poplar High Street
- Metropolitan Borough of Poplar (1900–1965)
- Poplar DLR station
- Poplar (London County Council constituency)
- Poplar (UK Parliament constituency)
- Poplar and Limehouse (UK Parliament constituency)
- Poplar Walk, Christ Church Meadow, Oxford

United States

- Poplar, California
- Poplar, Iowa
- Poplar, Minnesota
- Poplar, Montana
- Poplar, North Carolina in Mitchell County
- Poplar, Philadelphia
- Poplar, Virginia
- Poplar, Wisconsin

== Other uses ==
- Poplar (convenience store), a Japanese company
- Poplar Taneshima, a main character from the Working!! manga and anime series
- Poplars (Monet series), paintings by Claude Monet

== See also ==
- Poplar Island (disambiguation)
- Poplar River (disambiguation)
- Poplar station (disambiguation)
- Poplar Tree Incident in Korea
- Popular (disambiguation)
- Populous (disambiguation)
