= Renato Barisani =

Italian sculptor and painter

- Born: 15 November 1918
- Died: 3 September 2011 (aged 92)
- Known for: Sculpture; painting

Renato Barisani (15 November 1918 – 3 September 2011) was an Italian sculptor and painter.

== Biography ==
A native of Naples, Barisani attended the Filippo Palizzi Art Institute of Naples under the guidance, among others, of Alberto Chiancone, Carlo De Veroli and Francesco Galante. He graduated in sculpture in 1937 at the Art Institute of Naples and, thanks to the Filippo Palizzi scholarship, he studied for two years at the Higher Institute of Industrial Art (ISIA) in the Royal Park of Monza where he graduated after having attended the courses of Pio Semeghini, Giuseppe Pagano, Agnoldomenico Pica and Marino Marini.

Back in Naples, R. Barisani attended the Academy of Fine Arts, a period during which he won, in 1940, the first prize for sculpture and bas-relief to the Prelittoriali dell'Arte. In 1941 he graduated in Sculpture at the Academy of Fine Arts in Naples and in the same year he won the sculpture award "Vincenzo Gemito". In August of the same year, he was called to arms in the Italian Army from which he was discharged in September of the following year.

In 1948 he started teaching art at the Liceo Artistico di Napoli, until 1956, when he became lecturer at the State Art Institute of Torre del Greco. From 1950 to 1955, together with Renato De Fusco, Guido Tatafiore and Antonio Venditti, he formed the "Neapolitan concrete art group", moving into geometric-abstract research. During these years Renato Barisani exhibited at the Abstract and Concrete Art Exhibition in Italy at the National Gallery of Modern Art in Rome and at the collective exhibitions in Montecarlo, Milan and Florence. From 1953 to 1957 he was also present in the "Concrete Art Movement" of Milan (MAC), participating in almost all the exhibitions, including historical ones, in Italy and abroad.

After participating in various national exhibitions, together with the Milanese group (MAC), the Neapolitan concrete art group held an important exhibition in 1954 at the Medea Gallery in Naples. In these years, together with a concretist pictorial production, it is outlined the period dedicated to the research of plastic nature by the artist, which mainly sees the use of materials such as painted iron and plexiglass. Between 1956 and 1962, on the other hand, it is possible to place a nucleus of informal pictorial works, characterized by a strong material interest clearly visible through the use of mechanical objects.

From 1960 to 1963, at the invitation of the founder Georges Kasper, he joined the "New European School" in Lausanne. In this period he took part in the most important exhibitions in Antwerp, Lausanne, Trieste and Brussels. In 1961 Renato Barisani exhibited at the Galleria San Carlo in Naples with a solo show and in 1962 he was invited to exhibit at the XXXI Venice Biennale. The same year he won the Sicilia Industria Award in Palermo, Sicily, and the Swiss Abstract Painting Award.

In 1963 one of his works was exhibited at the Contemporary Italian Paintings exhibition, held in some of the major Australian cities. This period shows a return to the pure form of concretist origin that dates back to the mid-1960s. The following decades are characterized by the continuous experimentation of different artistic and media languages ranging from geometric research conducted both in painting and sculpture, to material interest, to the use of sensitive paper, to collages with sandpaper, photocopies and other materials.

From 1964 the artist also devoted himself to the decoration of ceramics, winning the second prize at the "Ceramica Grandecoro" competition and the second prize at the 5th Biennial of Metal Art in Gubbio in Modena in 1969. He is invited to the Roman Quadrennial of 1965 and 1986, to the Venetian Biennials of 1962 and 1972 and, in 1977, R. Barisani exhibits in his first important anthological exhibition at the Museum of Villa Pignatelli in Naples, where he presents works realized in the period from 1940 to 1975 . In 1978 he was assigned the position of professor of Design at the Academy of Fine Arts in Naples, which he will leave in 1984. The following years are marked by intense experimentation with techniques and materials: oil paintings, spray, watercolor, pastels, sands and wooden forms with which he made collages and the first paintings that characterize his last period.

In 1993 Barisani received the prestigious award from the Pollock-Krasner Foundation of New York City. In October 2000, the City of Naples dedicated a major anthological exhibition to him in Castel dell'Ovo, with works from the 1950s to 2000. On that occasion, a large painted steel sculpture, the Grande Arco, was permanently installed on the entrance to the castle, which the artist intended to be as a gift for the City of Naples. In the same year, another large sculpture is located, also in painted corten steel, in the gardens of the Quattro Giornate underground station in Naples.

In 2008, the Palazzo Delle Arti in Naples dedicated a personal exhibition to him with the most recent works of art, colored sculptures, paintings and a selection of the latest jewelry. The following year Barisani was included, from a special commission of the historic and prestigious Academy of San Luca in Rome, among the last five preselected artist for the Award of the President of the Republic to a painter. Renato Barisani died in Naples on 3 September 2011, at the age of almost 93 years. On 8 October of the same year, the last personal exhibition was held in Rome, previously agreed upon by the artist and then realized, after his death, by his son.

In July 2017, the Municipal Gallery of Contemporary Art in the city of Gaeta dedicates a new anthological exhibition to Barisani, in which over 200 works were exhibited, some of which were unpublished, including numerous paintings, sculptures, ceramics, tapestries, mosaics and jewels.
