= Poplar River =

Poplar River may refer to:

- Canada
  - Manitoba
    - Poplar River (Manitoba)
    - Poplar River First Nation, a First Nation community astride the river in Manitoba
  - Ontario
    - Kenora District
      - Poplar River (Atikameg River), part of the Kapiskau River system
      - Poplar River (Fawn River), in the Severn River system
      - Poplar River (Manitoba) (the upper reaches of which are in Ontario)
    - Poplar River (Nipissing District), in Nipissing District, part of the French River system
  - Poplar River (Montana–Saskatchewan), a tributary of the Missouri River in Saskatchewan in Canada and Montana in the United States
- United States
  - Poplar River (Lake Superior), Minnesota
  - Poplar River (Lost River), Minnesota
  - Poplar River (Montana–Saskatchewan), a tributary of the Missouri River in Saskatchewan in Canada and Montana in the United States
