= Popular Song (disambiguation) =

Popular Song is an award given by the Library of Congress.

Popular Song may also refer to:

- Popular Songs, a 2009 album by indie rock band Yo La Tengo
- "Popular Song" (song), by Mika
- "Popular Song", a section of Façade, Suite No. 2 by William Walton

== See also ==
- Popular music
- "The American Popular Song", a song by Neil Diamond composed by Tom Hensley
- Popular (disambiguation)#In_music for songs called "Popular"
