= Artificial waterfall =

Architecture resembling a drop in a river's course

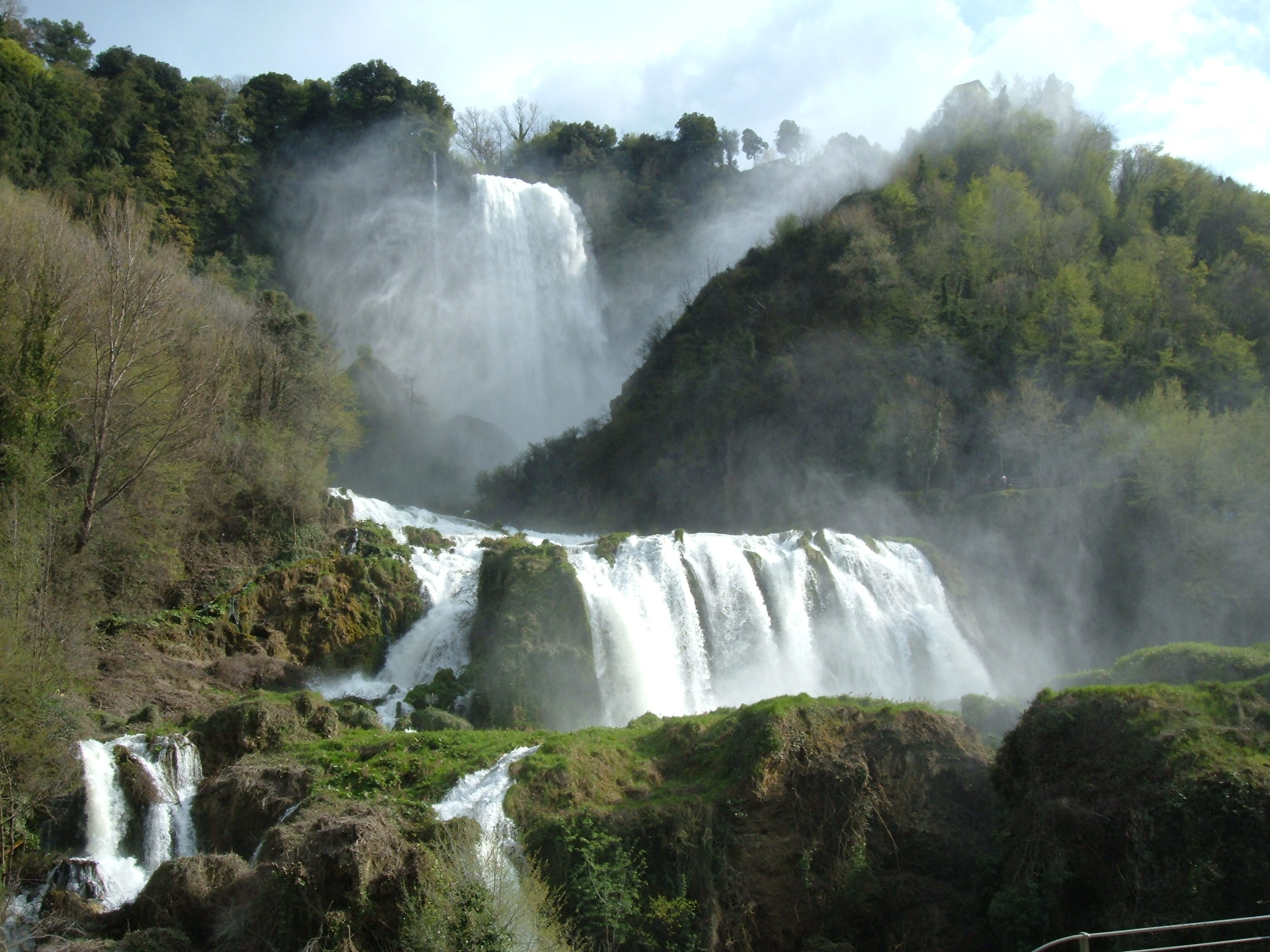
The Marmore Falls in Umbria, Italy, the tallest artificial waterfall in the world

An artificial waterfall is a water feature or fountain which imitates a natural waterfall.

Artificial waterfalls have long been featured in traditional Japanese gardens, where they can serve to highlight a scene or to provide focus. The classic gardening manual Sakuteiki, written in the mid-to-late 11th century, lists nine different types. The Cascata delle Marmore is an example of a human-made waterfall created by the ancient Romans.

Artificial waterfalls were popular in Europe in the late 19th and early 20th centuries, including the famous waterfall in Viktoriapark in Berlin. An early American example is Huntington Waterfalls in Golden Gate Park, San Francisco, California. In 1896, Gardening Magazine reported that it was the only artificial waterfall in a public park in North America.

The Liebian International Plaza in Guiyang, Guizhou, China has a 108 m (354 ft) waterfall on one face of the 121 m (397 ft) mixed-use skyscraper.

The New York City Waterfalls (2008), a temporary public art installation by artist Olafur Eliasson, consisted of four human-made waterfalls constructed with 270 tons of exposed scaffolding.

== Indoor waterfalls ==
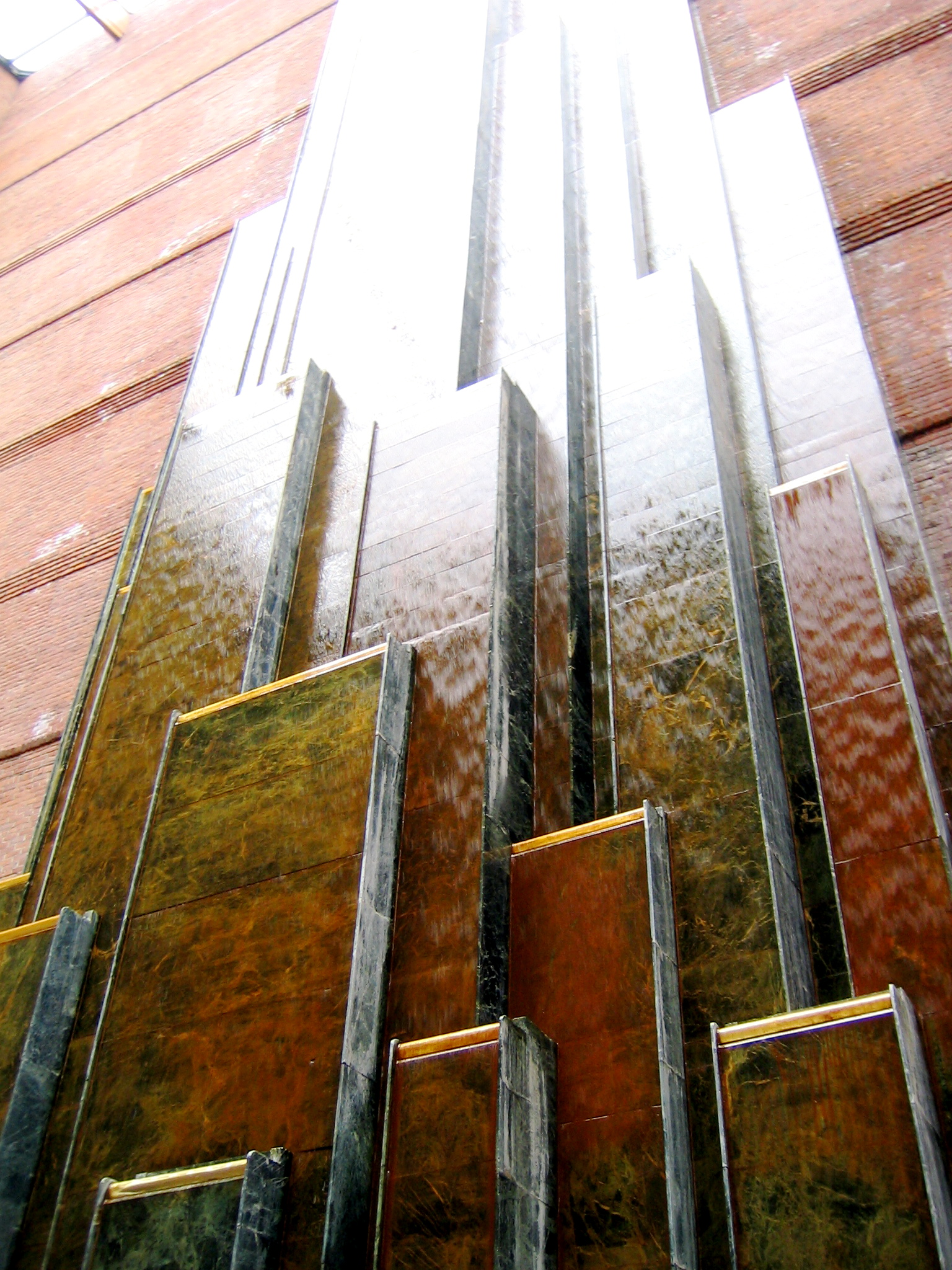
An indoor waterfall at the International Center, in Detroit

Artificial waterfalls installed inside buildings can be small or quite large. Some of the benefits of indoor waterfalls are considered to be their production of white noise, humidity, as well as naturally peaceful feelings engendered among onlookers.

Two notable indoor waterfalls in the world are both located in Singapore; The largest indoor waterfall in Singapore is The Rain Vortex at Jewel Changi Airport (opened in 2019) whilst the second-largest indoor waterfall in Singapore is the Cloud Forest at Gardens by the Bay (opened in 2012).

== Gallery ==
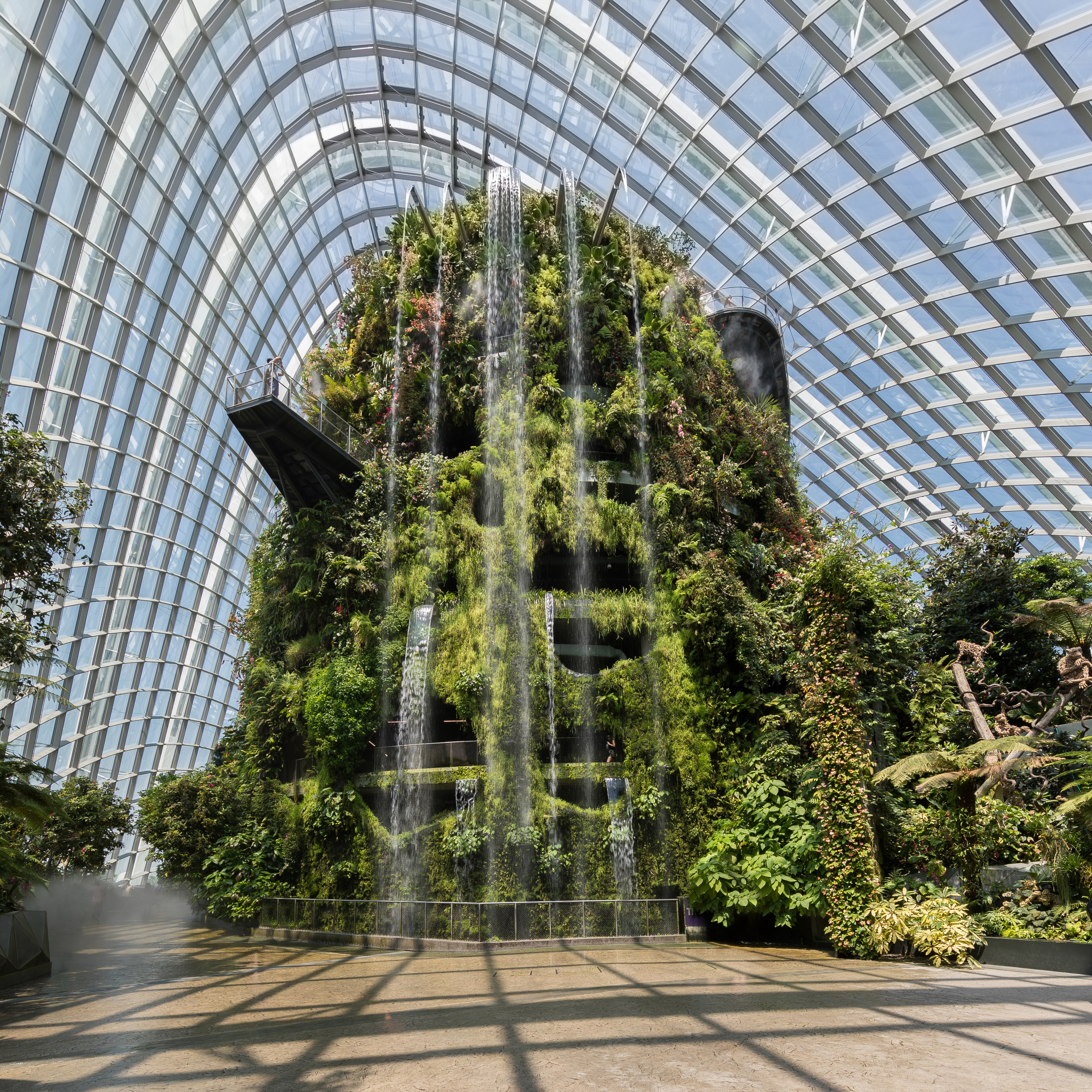
Cloud Forest from the entrance of the site, Gardens by the Bay, Singapore

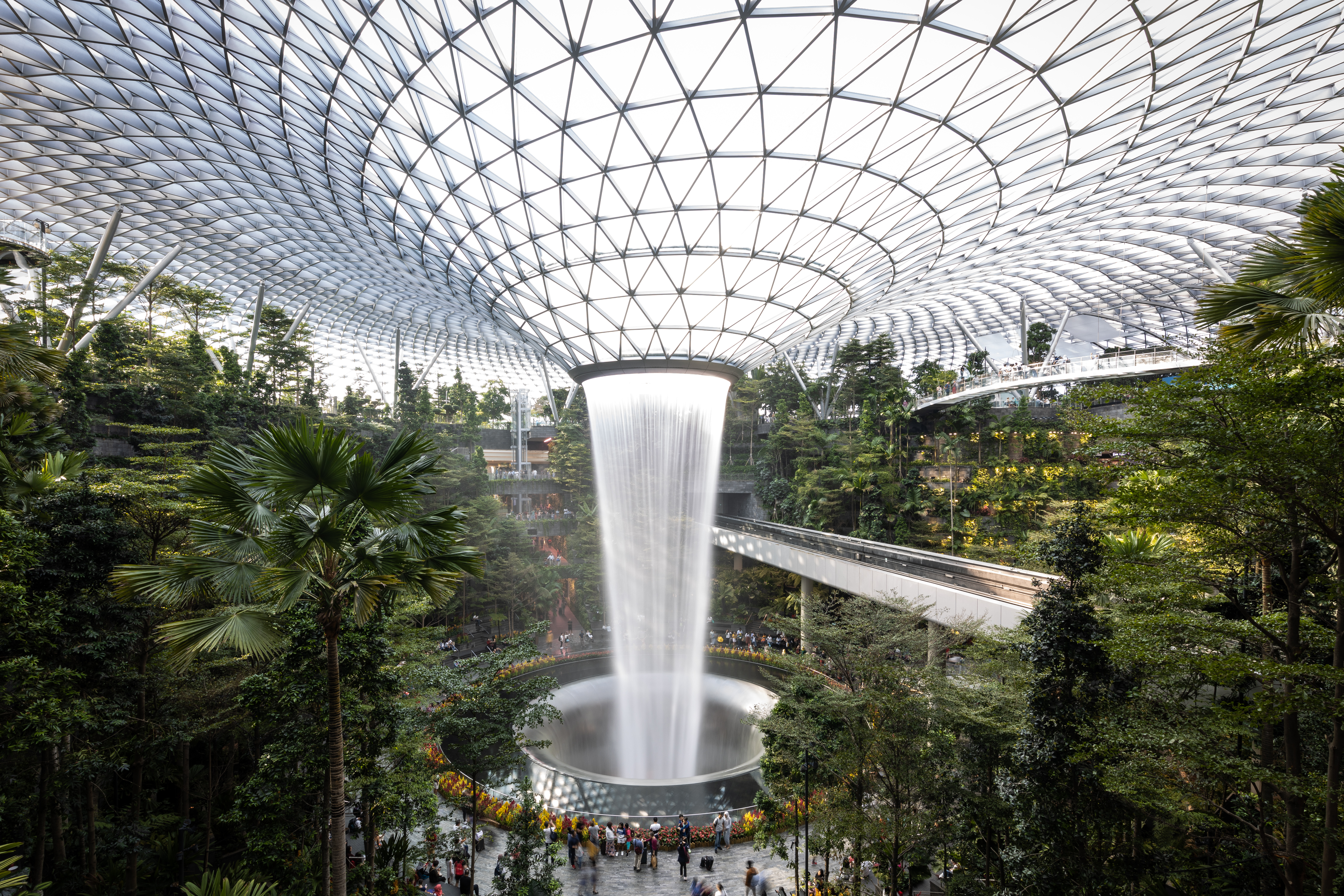
The Rain Vortex at Jewel Changi Airport, Singapore

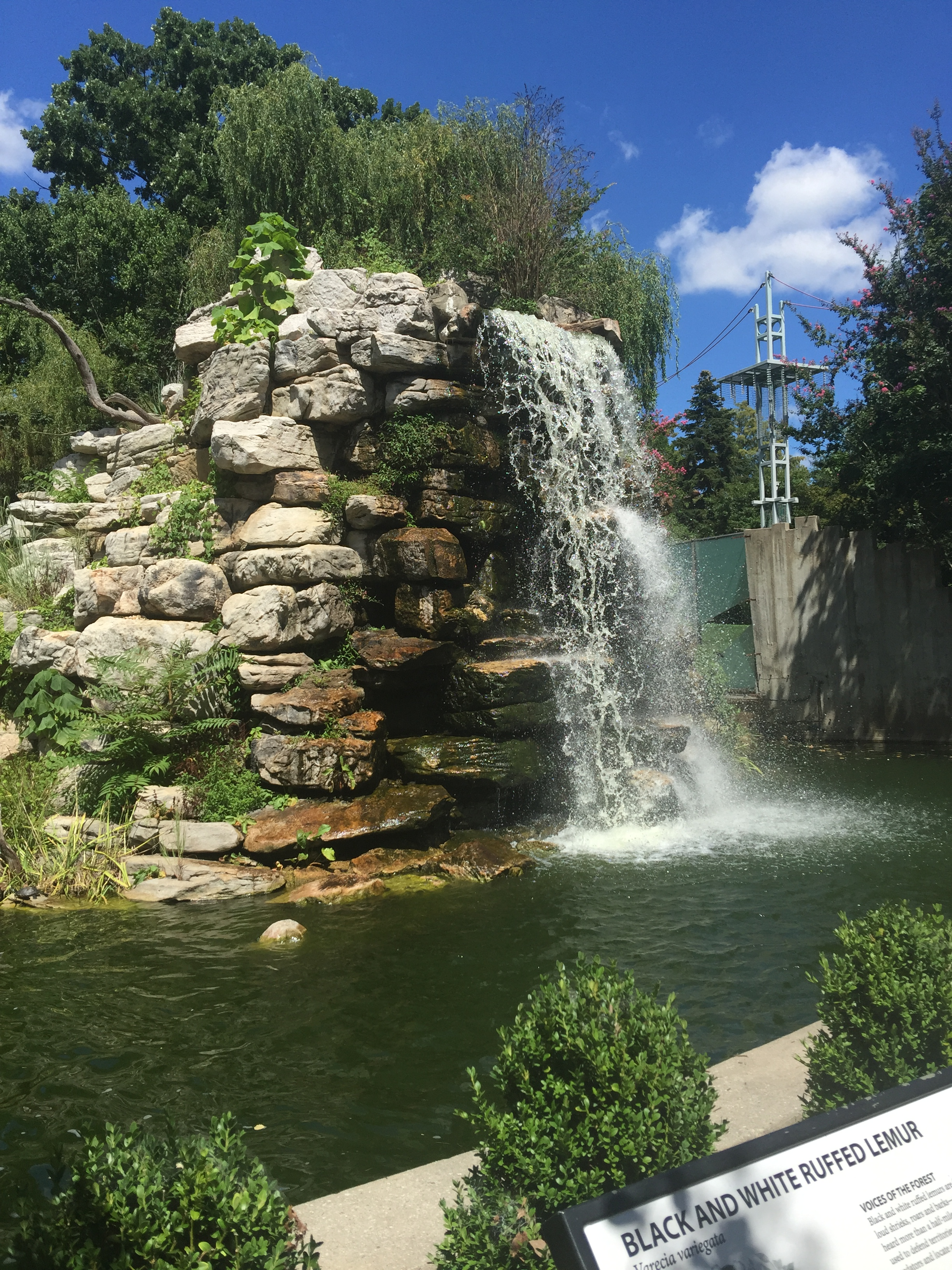
An artificial waterfall in an animal enclosure at the National Zoo in Washington D.C.

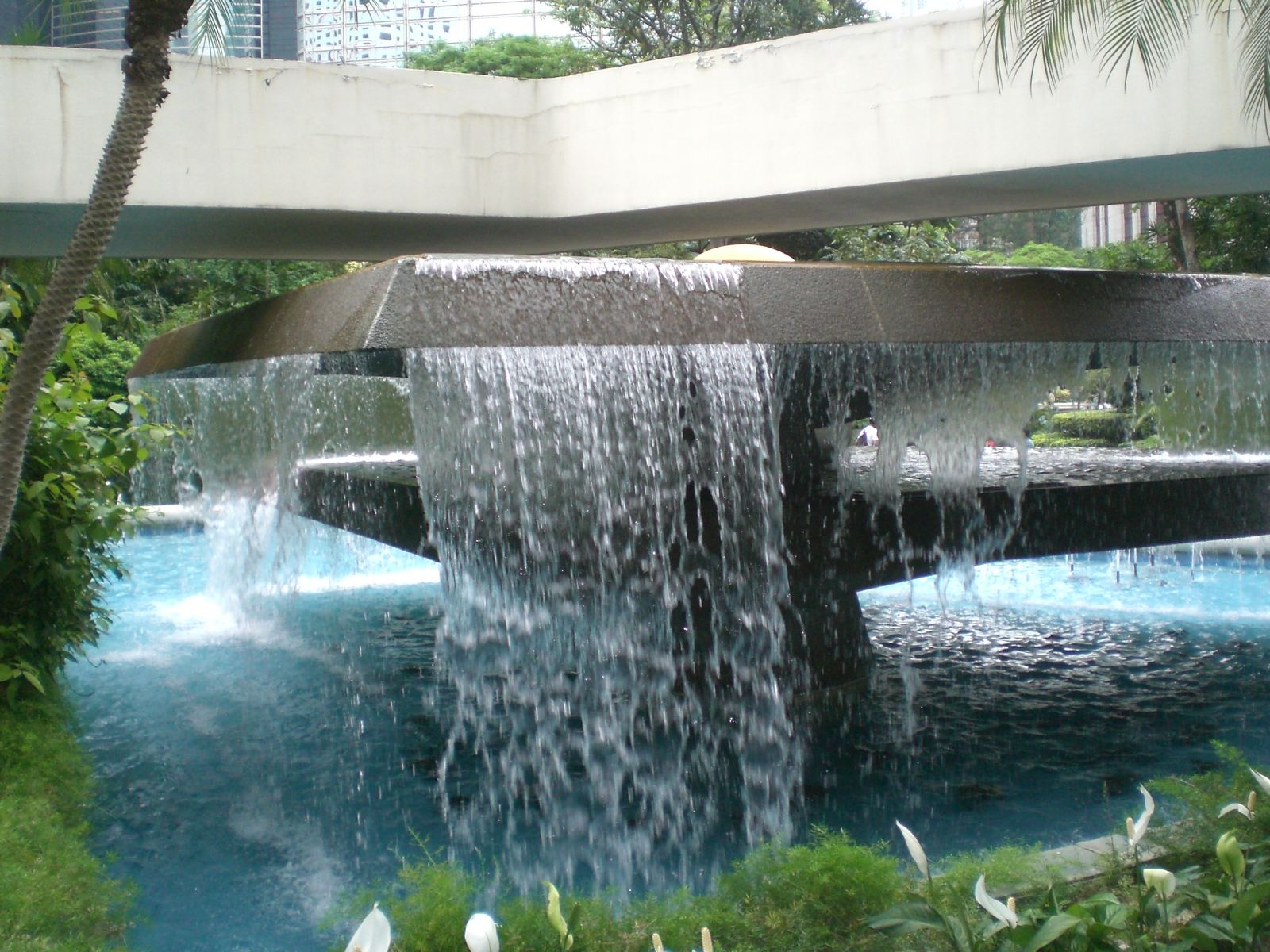
Chater Garden in Hong Kong

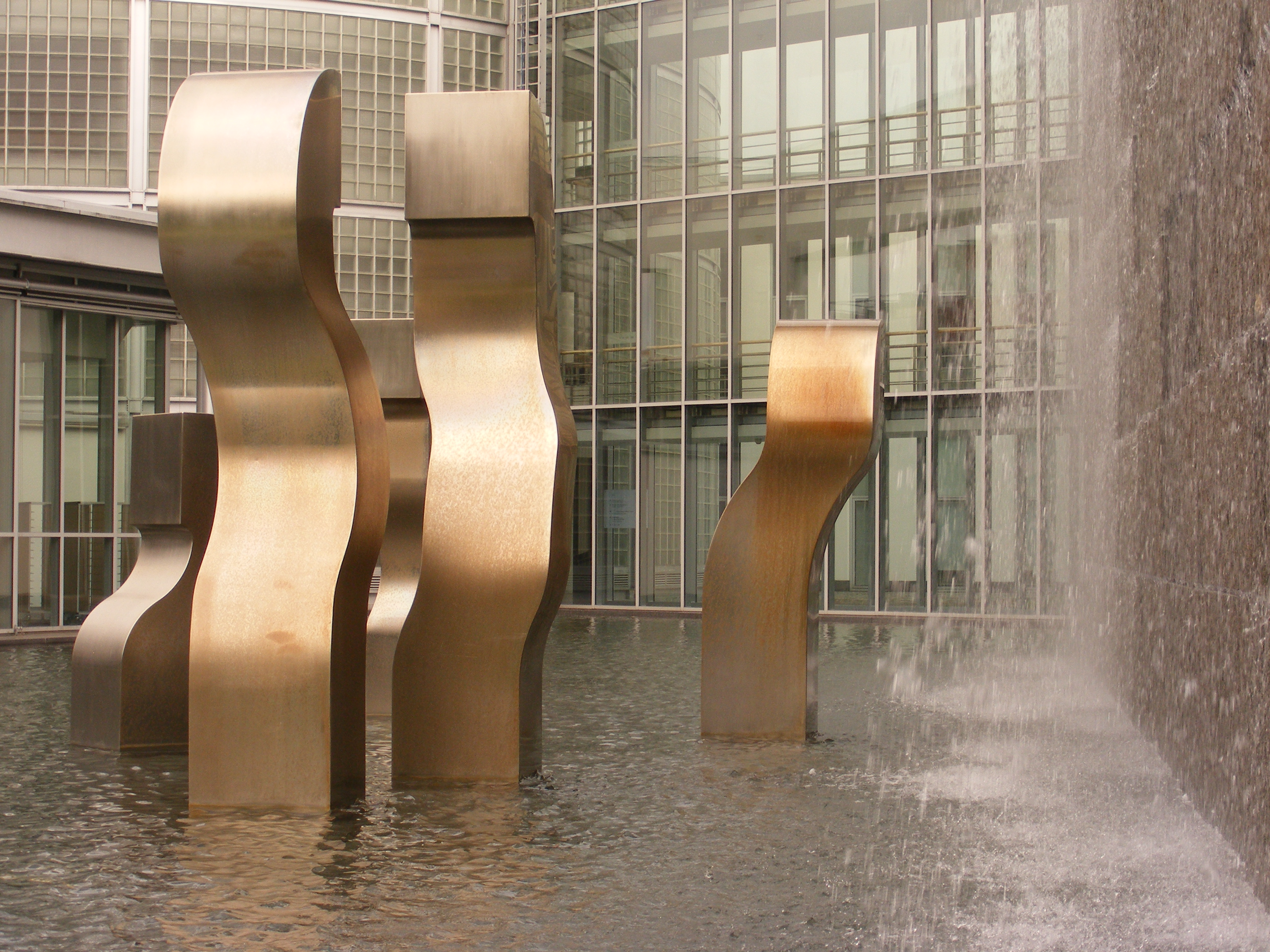
Artificial waterfall and sculpture at a transportation company in Salzburg

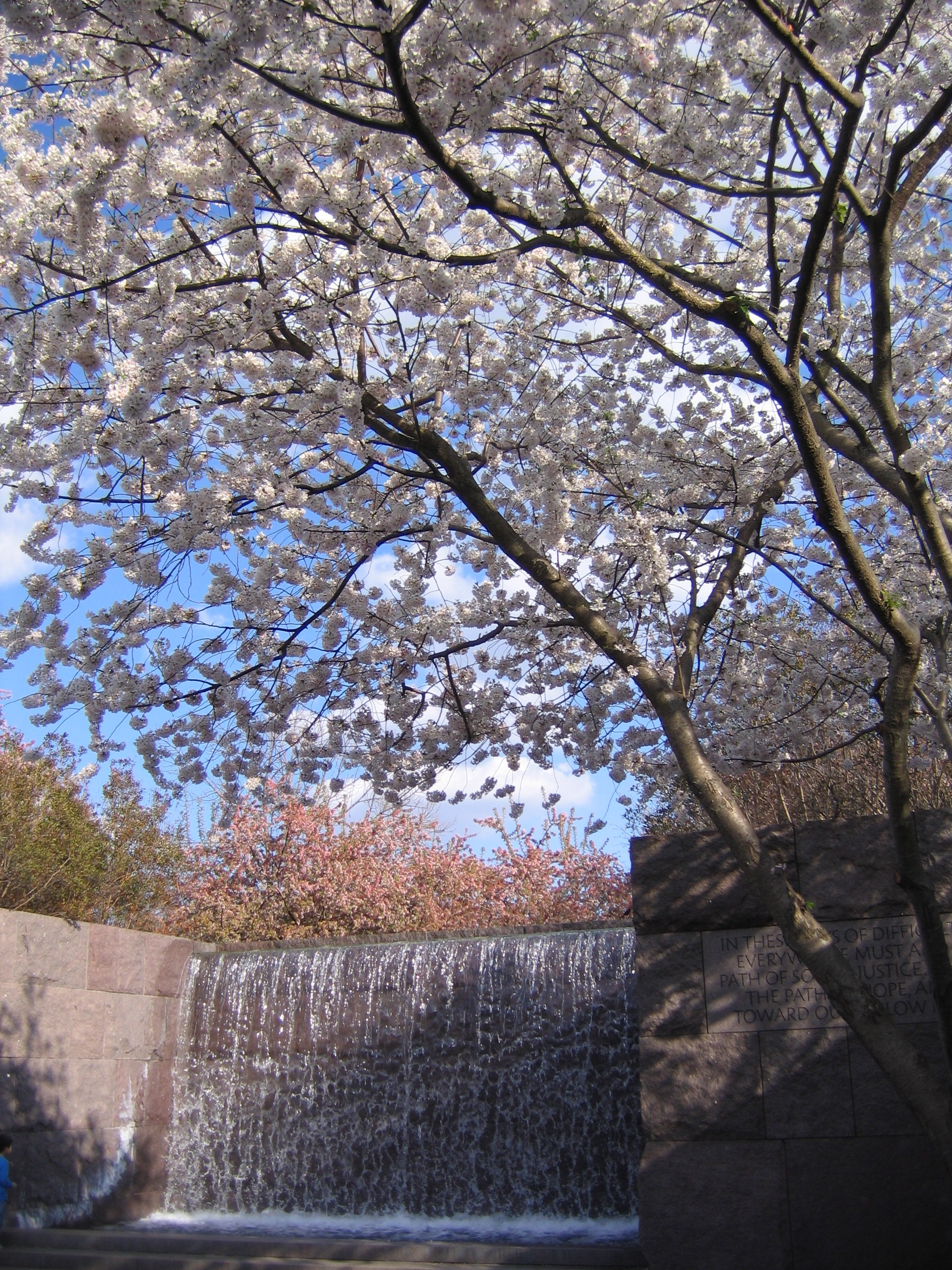
FDR Memorial in Washington D.C.

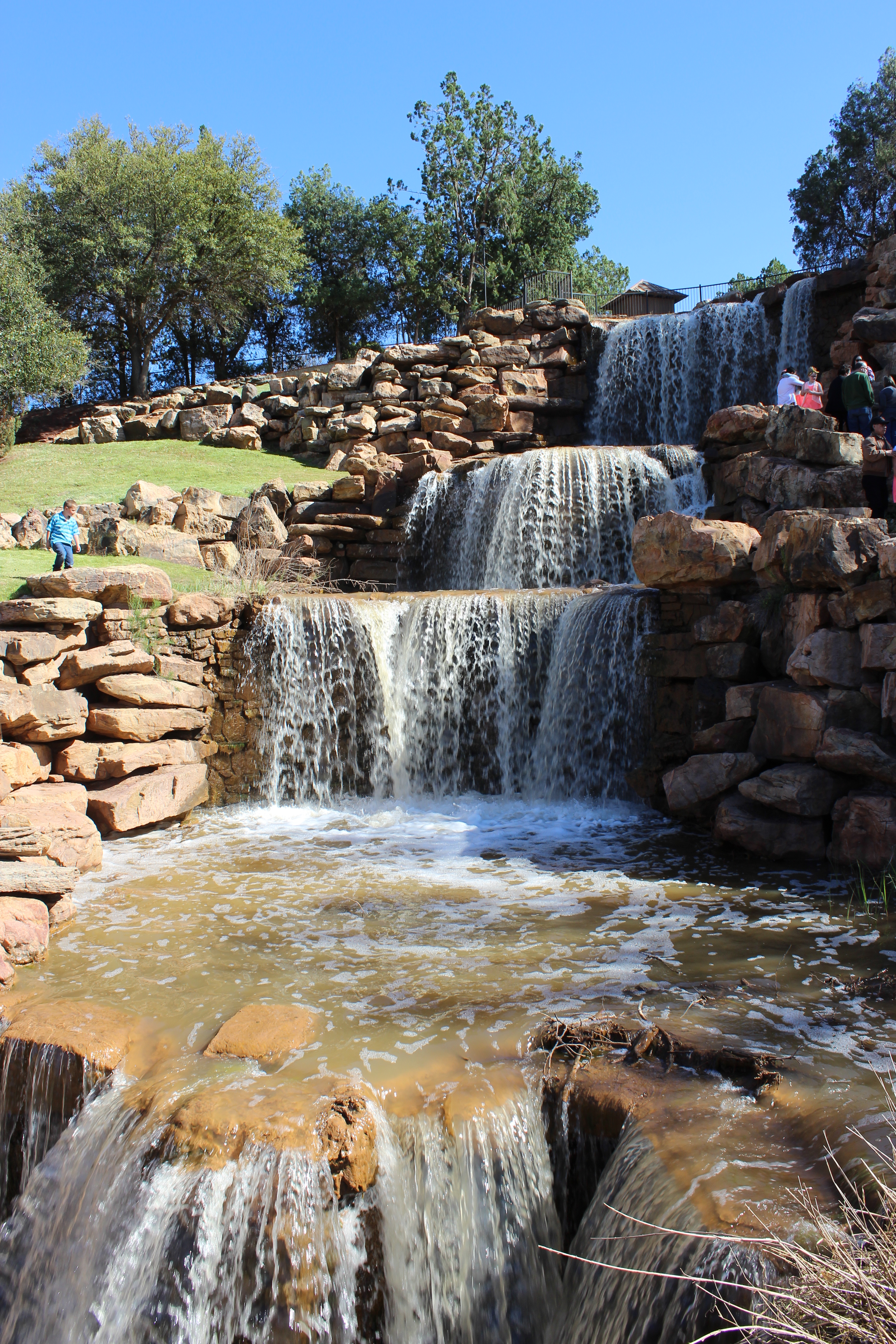
Artificial waterfall in Wichita Falls, Texas

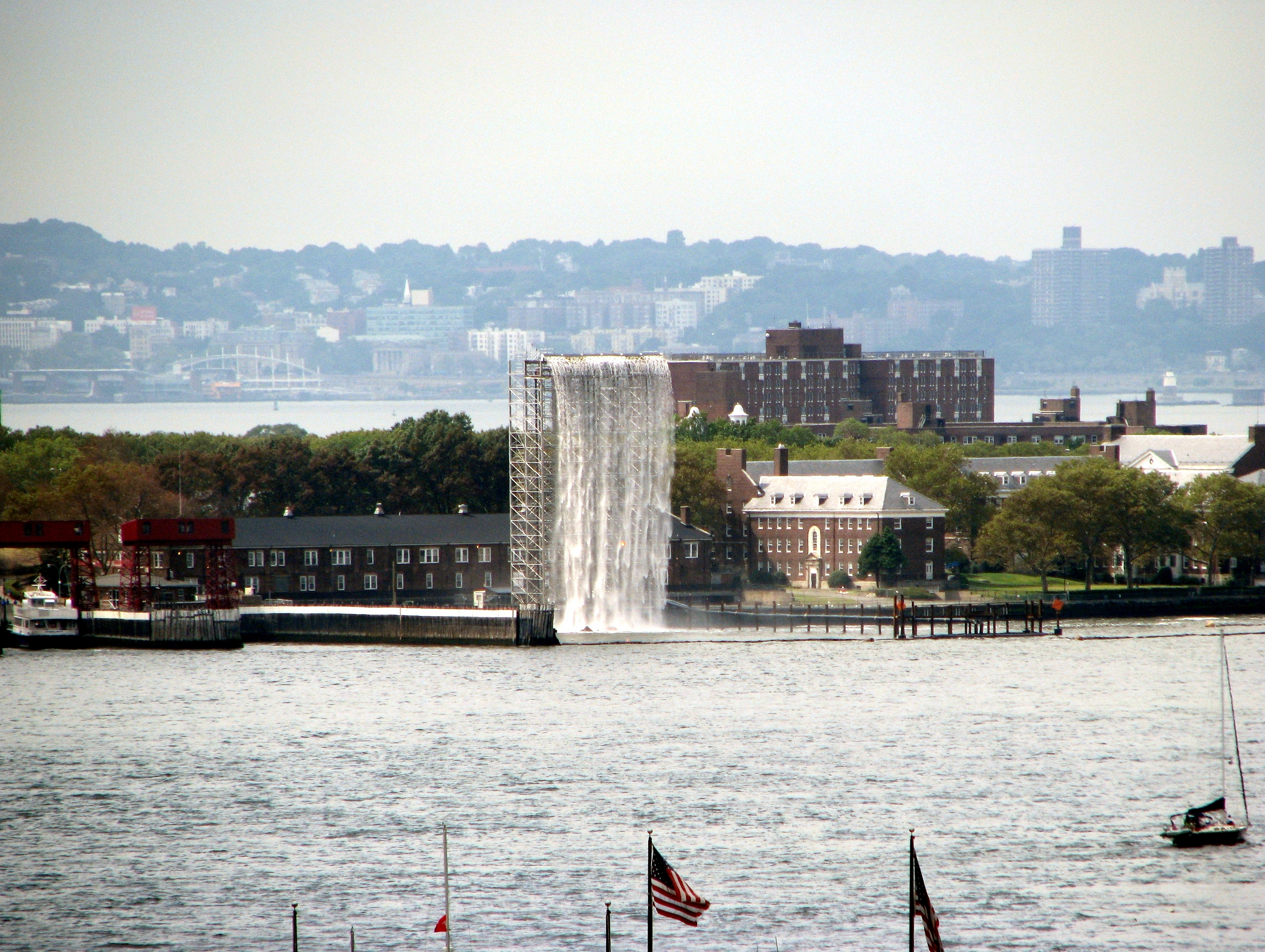
One of the four human-made falls in Olafur Eliasson's 2008 public art installation, New York City Waterfalls
