= Poplar station (disambiguation) =

Poplar station can refer to

- Poplar DLR station, a station on the Docklands Light Railway in London
- Poplar station (PAAC), a station on the Pittsburgh light rail network
- Poplar railway station, a former station on the London and Blackwall Railway
- Poplar (East India Road) railway station, a former station on the North London Railway

== See also ==
- Poplar (disambiguation)
