= Poplar Island =

Poplar Island may refer to:

Canada

- Poplar Island (British Columbia)
- Poplar Island (Prince Edward Island)

United Kingdom

- Poplar Island, River Thames
- Poplar Eyot

United States

- Poplar Island (Chesapeake Bay)
- Poplar Island (West Virginia)
- Poplar Island (Maryland)
