= RSP Architects Planners & Engineers =

Singapore architecture firm

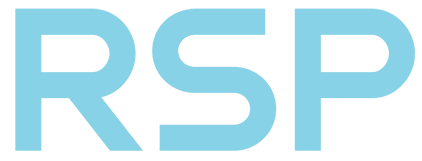
- Formerly: Raglan Squire & Partners
- Type: Private
- Industry: Architecture; Engineering; Built environment
- Founded: 1956
- Headquarters: Singapore
- Area served: China; Singapore; United Arab Emirates; Vietnam
- Website: Official website

RSP Architects Planners & Engineers is a Singaporean architecture, planning and engineering firm. It traces its origins to the Singapore office of the British practice Raglan Squire & Partners, established by architect Robert Davidson in 1956. The practice expanded alongside Singapore’s post-independence urban development, particularly under architects and planners Albert Hong, Alan Choe and Liu Thai Ker. It adopted its present name in 1980, became a private company in 1992 and subsequently established operations in countries including India and China.

The firm has been involved in the design and development of projects including Parkway Parade, the Monetary Authority of Singapore Building, the Singapore Indoor Stadium and Jewel Changi Airport. In 2013, the company was acquired by the Singapore-listed investment firm Rowsley.

== History ==
=== Establishment under Raglan Squire ===
In 1950, Raglan Squire founded Raglan Squire & Partners in London, United Kingdom; their early commissions included educational and industrial buildings. During this time, the practice was engaged in converting 100 single-family houses in Eaton Square in Belgravia, London. Individually these houses were large enough to accommodate a family with live-in servants. However, by 1945, less than 5 percent of the occupants could afford the lifestyle and a decision was made to convert the houses into smaller flats. In 1952, Squire was engaged to design the Engineering College at Rangoon University in Burma. Through his project, throughout the 1950s and 1960s, Raglan Squire & Partners was involved in several British projects, including large office blocks in Croydon and a notable factory at Farnborough as well as in other foreign works. In 1955, he did a town planning scheme for Mosul, Iraq, and a report for Baghdad airport.

In 1956, Robert Davidson, a British subject born in colonial Singapore and architect established a Singapore office of Raglan Squire & Partners, a British architecture firm with works created in United Kingdom and Rangoon. In 1962, Davidson decided to expand the business and establish an office in Kuala Lumpur, Federation of Malaya, of which he led until his retirement in 1973.

=== Growth with post-independence Singapore ===
Albert Hong joined the practice in 1964 and was made partner after a year. In 1966, the practice designed Cuscaden House, Singapore's first experiment in luxury serviced apartments. Cuscaden House was opened as a hotel in 1968.

In Malaysia, the chief architect of the Malaysia's Public Works Department, Nik Mohamed Mahmood joined in 1973 and left to establish his own practice, Kumpulan Senireka in 1975. In 1996, Hud Bakar gained control of the Malaysian practice.

In 1970, the Architect Act and Professional Engineers Act were passed and architects and engineers were not allowed to be partners in the same practice. This crimped on the practice as it had relied on engineers who were partners, such as Peter Holmes and Reg Pitcher for their success. Despite rejoinders to the authorities, the situation remain as such. In the end in 1979, the practice decided to open a subsidiary, Squire Mech, to hire engineers separate from the architectural practice.

In 1979, Hong decided to hire Alan Choe, who was Singapore's chief architect planner between 1974 and 1979 at Urban Redevelopment Authority. In Choe's 19 year tenure, the practice flourished as he utilised his knowledge gained while working in URA to secure and design projects as the government was release land parcels for development through the Government Land Sales system since 1967. Choe worked on projects such as Parkway Parade and the Monetary Authority of Singapore Building.

In 1986, Albert Hong became the managing partner of the practice. In 1980, the practice was renamed to RSP Architects Planners and Engineers in 1980. In 1991, the Architects Act and the Professional Engineers Act were amended to allow multi-disciplinary corporate practice. In 1992, the practice made the transition into a private company. In November 1992, Liu Thai Ker was the third chief executive officer of URA to joined the practice.

In 1993, RSP became involved with the development of the International Tech Park in Bangalore as part of the Singapore consortium developing the site, and owned 15.1% of the equity. The involvement lead to the establishment of the RSP practice in India in 1996. In 2008, Barings Asia acquired 40% of the India practice for $100 million.

In 1993 still, RSP was awarded the project to develop Fuzhou Changle International Airport in China. Through the project, it established a local office in the country.

In 1994, RSP floated a plan to list its holding company, RSP Holdings, which was registered as a public company of more than 500 members on 18 April that year. However, it sparked a debate within the regulators, Board of Architects and Singapore Institute of Architects as the laws at that time did not allow more than one-third of the shares to be owned by non-architectural professionals or engineers. The laws were amended in 1995 to remove such restrictions, but RSP did not get an approval from the Stock Exchange of Singapore in 1996.

In 2004, the Vietnam office was opened. In 2009, RSP opened its Dubai office to service clients in the region, and had taken on projects such as the Nakheel Mall, the Dubai Hills Offices, and BAPS Hindu Mandir Abu Dhabi.

In 2013, Rowsley Ltd, an investment firm bought RSP Architects Planners & Engineers (Pte) Ltd for S$187 million (US$149.44 million) from all five partners of the practice, Albert Hong, Lee Kut Cheung, Lai Huen Poh, Liu Thai Ker and Hud Abu Bakar. In 2015, Rowsley used $20.6 million to make a cash purchase of the five partners' stake in Venture India, the holding company that held 34.7% stake in RSP Design Consultants (India). 20% of the India offices was held by its management, and 45% by Baring Private Equity Asia. As of July 2017, the Singaporean billionaire Peter Lim owned 45.34% of Rowsley. Lim's control of Rowsley increased to 90.02% in December 2017 after it acquired another of Lim's privately owned company that wholly owned Thomson Medical businesses. Rowsley was subsequently renamed to Thomson Medical Group (TMG).

In 2017, Albert Hong stepped down from the executive chairman position, and left the company be managed by two managing directors, Lee Kut Cheung and Lai Huen Poh. In 2018, the company was spun out of TMG into RSP Holdings Pte Ltd as TMG refocused itself as primarily a healthcare business. In 2023, Kiat Lim was appointed as the company's chairman.

In August 2025, it was announced that RSP was engaged by Johor royal family to develop its waterfront residence in Desaru, Johor.

== Notable projects ==
- In 1961, it designed the military hospital in Camp Terendak, Malacca.
- In 1964, the firm was appointed by City Developments Limited to develop City Towers.
- In 1981, it designed a S$140 million (US$66.27 million) retail-residential complex. Riverwalk Galleria.
- In 1985, it was appointed to design the Singapore Indoor Stadium jointly with Kenzō Tange.
- In 2013 the Jewel Changi Airport project started with RSP being the executive architect and civil and structural engineer.
