= Populous =

Populous may refer to:

- Populous Holdings, an architectural company
- Populous (series), video game series
  - Populous (video game), first video game of the series
- Populous (musician), an Italian electronic musician

== See also ==
- Populus (disambiguation)
- Poplar (disambiguation)
- Popular (disambiguation)
