= Populaire =

Populaire (French for "popular"), may refer to:

- Populaire (automobile), manufactured in 1899
- Populaire (film), a 2012 French romantic film
- Le Populaire (French newspaper), in publication from 1918 to 1970
- Le Populaire (Senegalese newspaper)

== See also ==
- Popular (disambiguation)
