= Jewel Changi Airport =

Entertainment and retail complex in Singapore

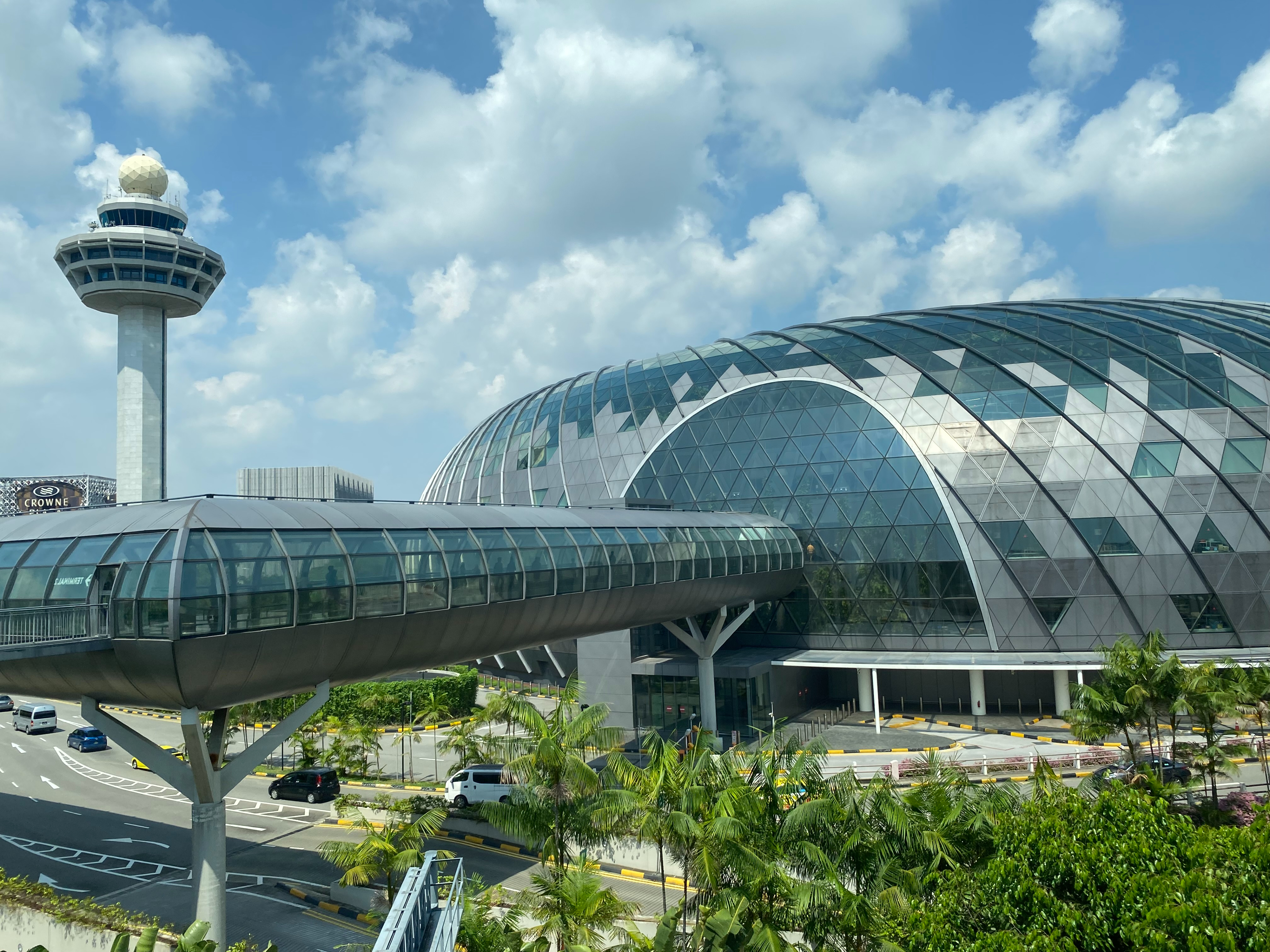
- Jewel Changi Airport

General information
- Status: Completed
- Type: Retail; entertainment; observation
- Architectural style: Neofuturistic
- Location: Changi, Singapore, 78 Airport Boulevard, Singapore 819666, Singapore
- Coordinates: 1°21′52″N 103°59′29″E
- Construction started: 5 December 2014; 11 years ago
- Opened: 17 April 2019; 7 years ago (soft opening); 18 October 2019; 7 years ago (official opening)
- Cost: S$1.7 billion
- Owner: Changi Airport Group CapitaLand Jewel Changi Airport Trustee Pte. Ltd.

Technical details
- Material: Steel and glass
- Size: 3.5 hectares (8.6 acres)
- Floor count: 12 – 5 above-ground storeys and 7 basement levels (Levels B5 — B2, B2M, B1, B1M, L1-L5)
- Floor area: 135,700 square metres (1,461,000 sq ft)

Design and construction
- Architects: Moshe Safdie; RSP Architects Planners & Engineers Private Limited
- Structural engineer: RSP Architects Planners & Engineers
- Other designers: PWP Landscape Architecture; ICN Design International Pte Ltd; Ove Arup; Benoy; Lighting Planners Associates
- Main contractor: Obayashi Corporation; Woh Hup Pte. Ltd.

Website
- jewelchangiairport.com

Jewel Changi Airport (also known as Jewel; Chinese: 星耀樟宜; pinyin: Xīng yào Zhāngyí; lit. 'Singapore Sparkle Changi', Malay: Jewel Lapangan Terbang Changi) is a nature-themed entertainment and retail complex surrounded by and linked to Terminals 1, 2, and 3 of Changi Airport in Singapore. Its centrepiece is the world's tallest indoor waterfall, the Rain Vortex, which is surrounded by a terraced forest setting. Jewel includes gardens, attractions, a hotel, about 300 retail and dining outlets, as well as early baggage check-in facilities. It covers a total floor area of 135,700 m^{2} (1,461,000 sq ft), spanning ten storeys—five above-ground and five basement levels.

Attractions include the Forest Valley, an indoor garden spanning five storeys; and the Canopy Park at the topmost level, featuring gardens and leisure facilities. Jewel receives about 300,000 visitors per day. In October 2019, six months after its soft opening, it welcomed 50 million visitors, exceeding its initial target for the whole year. In 2024, it achieved a record footfall of more than 80 million, the highest since its opening. The complex and airport are located in Changi, at the eastern end of Singapore, approximately 20 km (12 mi) northeast from Singapore's Downtown Core.

== Conception ==
Jewel was conceived to maintain Changi Airport's status as a major aviation hub in the Asia-Pacific. It was first mentioned by then-Prime Minister Lee Hsien Loong in his National Day Rally speech in 2013 as part of Changi Airport's long-term plans to double its capacity by the mid-2020s and "create more opportunities for Singapore and Singaporeans".

Built over the former open-air car park in front of Changi Airport Terminal 1, Jewel expanded Terminal 1's arrival hall and baggage reclaim areas by 70%, and its handling capacity was also expected to increase from 21 to 24 million passengers a year. Jewel was officially opened on 18 October 2019 by Lee, six months after its soft opening. During this time, it received 50 million visitors—about 300,000 per day—exceeding its initial target of 40–50 million visitors for the first year.

The concept was developed by Jewel Changi Airport Trustee Pte Ltd, a joint venture between Changi Airport Group (CAG) and CapitaLand, through its wholly owned shopping mall business, CapitaLand Mall Asia. The project cost S$1.7 billion and did not involve any government funds or taxpayer money, despite both entities being either wholly or partially owned by Temasek Holdings, the state-owned investment company.

== Design and development ==
Jewel's toroidal glass-and-steel façade was designed by a consortium of architects, led by Moshe Safdie, who also designed Singapore's Marina Bay Sands. Local firm RSP Architects Planners & Engineers were the executive architects and structural engineers. The landscape architect was PWP Landscape Architecture, who co-designed the National 9/11 Memorial in New York City and worked with Safdie on the landscaping of Marina Bay Sands. Benoy were the interior designers, BuroHappold Engineering were responsible for the façade, and Lighting Planners Associates handled the lighting. The Rain Vortex was engineered by water design firm WET Design; it has a 360-degree light and sound show projected onto it.

Jewel was envisioned to combine a marketplace and an urban park. "The component of the traditional mall is combined with the experience of nature, culture, education, and recreation, aiming to provide an uplifting experience. By drawing both visitors and local residents alike, we aim to create a place where the people of Singapore interact with the people of the world", said Safdie.

The glass panels of the dome are framed in steel that rests on a complex latticework. At night, the glowing dome is visible from surrounding areas.

== Attractions ==
=== Forest Valley ===
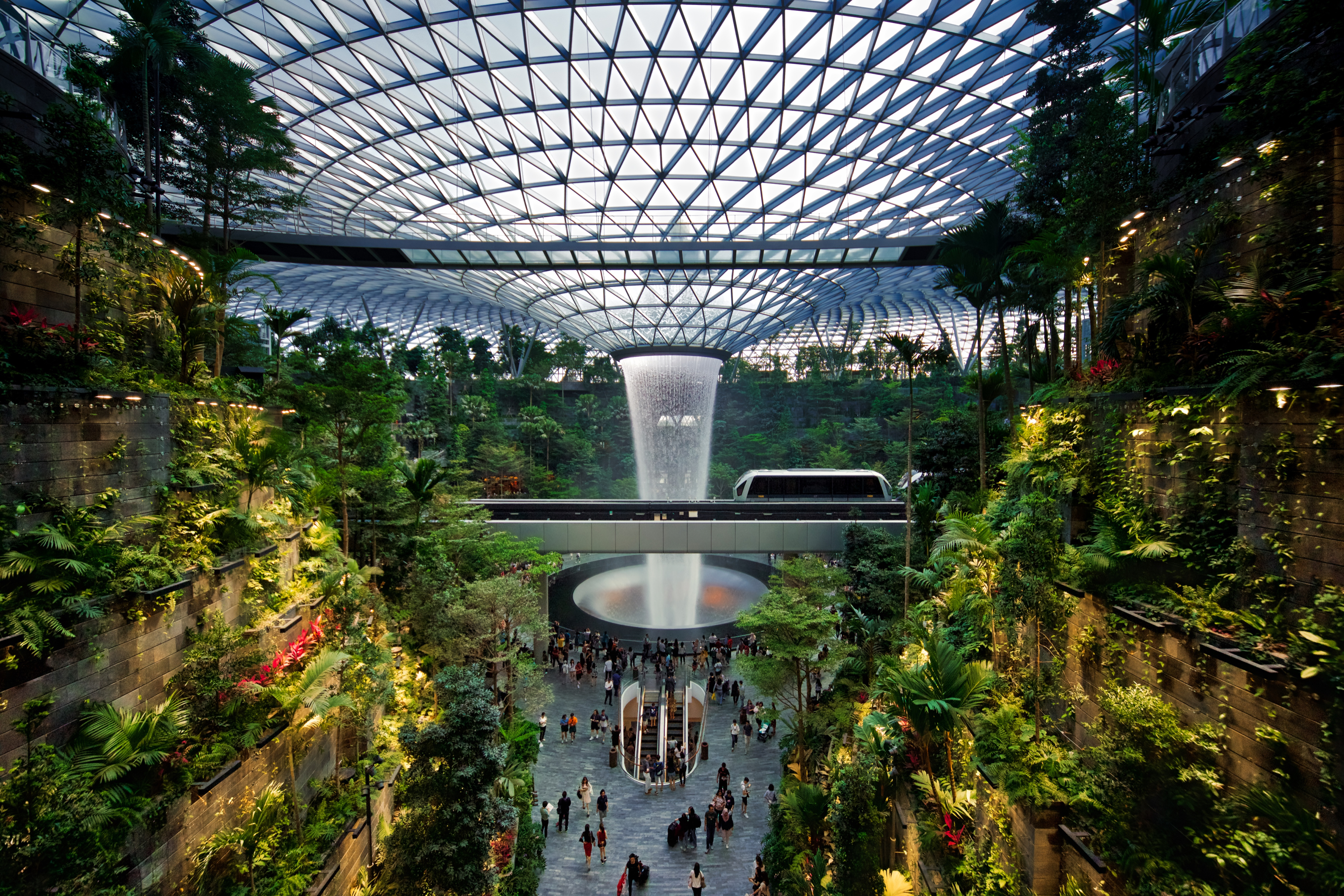
Forest Valley to the left and right

The Forest Valley is one of Asia's largest indoor gardens, spanning five stories and approximately 22,000 square metres (240,000 sq ft), located in the heart of Jewel Changi Airport. It houses around 3,000 trees and 60,000 shrubs of 120 species that live in high-altitude tropical forests around the world. It was conceived and designed by PWP Landscape Architecture.

=== Rain Vortex ===
Rain Vortex in 2023

The Rain Vortex is the world's largest and tallest indoor waterfall, standing at 40 metres (130 ft) high. Recirculating rain water is pumped to the roof to freefall through a round hole at up to 37,850 liters (8,330 imp gal; 10,000 U.S. gal) per minute to a basement-level pool. An acrylic funnel at the bottom prevents splashing and insulates the sound of the cascade. The toroid-shaped roof has more than 9,000 pieces of glass spanning 200 by 150 meters (660 by 490 ft), with a sloped oculus as the mouth of the waterfall acting as "a continuation of the building... completed in a liquid form". At night, the circular walls of the waterfall become a 360-degree stage for a light-and-sound show.

To prevent excess humidity in the Jewel, the waterfall's flow alternates between cascades and trickles that reduce air turbulence. The design process, by WET Design engineers, included testing a one-fifth-scale model and a full-size partial prototype.

The Changi Airport Skytrain connecting the terminals passes above ground near the waterfall, allowing passengers remaining airside to see the Vortex and Jewel itself.

=== Canopy Park ===
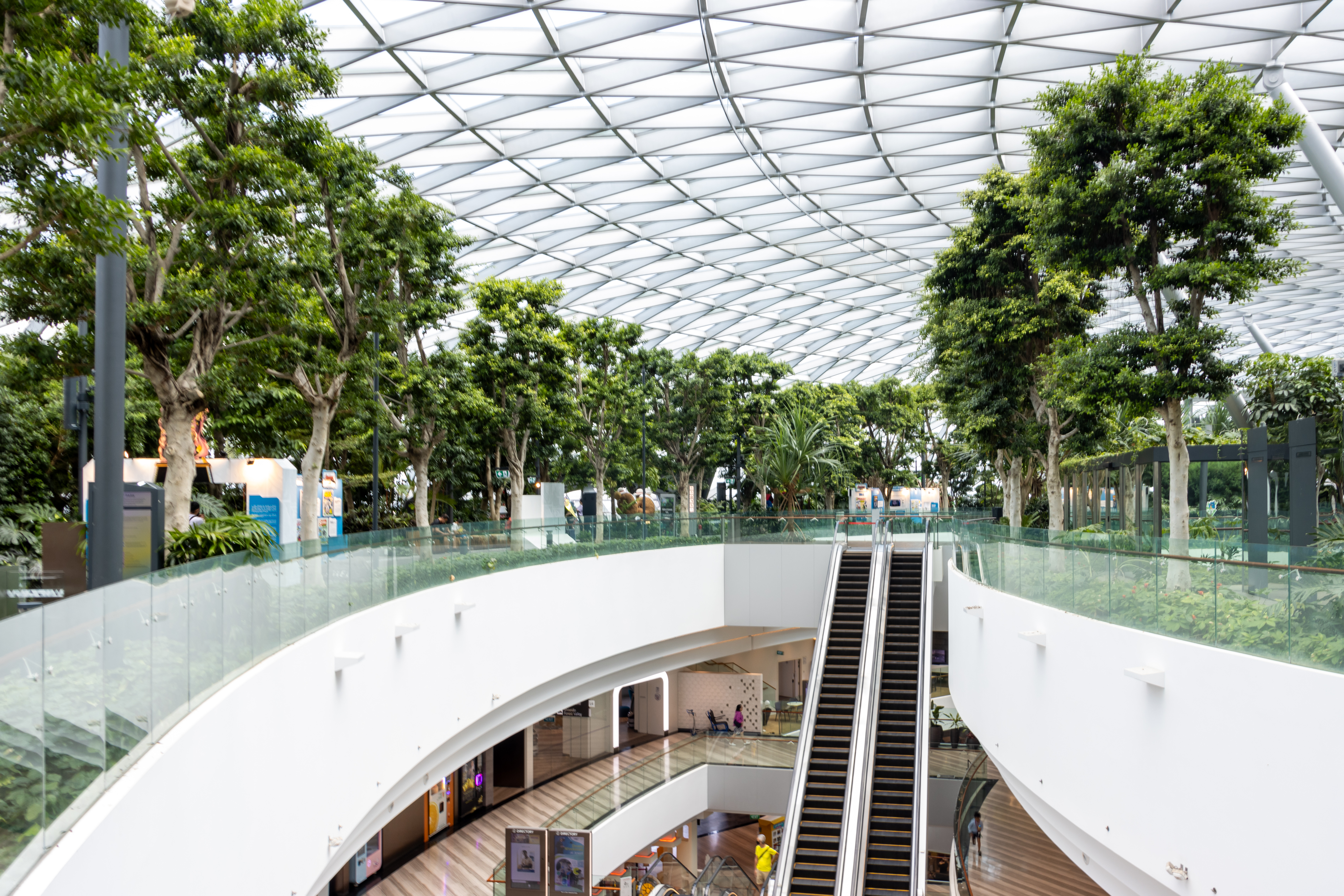
Topmost level at Jewel Changi

At the topmost level of Jewel, the 14,000-square-metre (150,000 sq ft) Canopy Park houses recreation and leisure attractions. About half of the total landscaping is hosted at Canopy Park, including two gardens: Topiary Walk and Petal Garden. The Topiary Walk features animal-shaped topiaries at every corner, while the Petal Garden has seasonal floral displays. The park includes a suspension bridge called the Mastercard Canopy Bridge, located 23 metres (75 ft) above the ground and offering a panoramic view of the Rain Vortex. At 50 metres (160 ft) long, the bridge also has a glass-panel floor at the centre section that offers a view down to level 1 of Jewel.

The park also consists of two mazes, situated at the eastern end of the Jewel, called the Hedge Maze and Mirror Maze. The Hedge Maze is Singapore's largest, with hedge walls standing at 1.8 metres (5 ft 11 in) high. The maze features gates that can be pushed inward and thus change the path of the maze. It ends at an elevated watchtower that offers a bird's-eye view of the entire maze. The Mirror Maze is located under the dome, with plants branching across the top. It makes use of mirrors and various reflections.

- Bouncing and Walking Nets – The Bouncing Net is 250 metres (820 ft) long, suspended 8 metres above ground at its highest point. A separate 50 metres (160 ft)-long Walking Net enables visitors to look down 25 metres (82 ft) to Jewel's level 1.
- Discovery Slides – the Discovery Slides feature four integrated slides: two tube slides and two sliding surfaces. The entire structure sits at an incline, 3 metres (9.8 ft) high on one end, and close to 7 metres (23 ft) on the other, and enables visitors to view the Forest Valley and the Rain Vortex. The Discovery Slides were designed by Carve and built by Playpoint in Singapore.
- Foggy Bowls – the Foggy Bowls are four concave bowls with depths of between 30 centimetres (12 in) and 65 centimetres (26 in) for people to jump in while mist is released to create an illusion of playing among clouds.

=== Changi Experience Studio ===
The Changi Experience Studio is a 3,000-square-metre (32,000 sq ft) space with interactive games and displays relating to the airport's history that allows visitors a behind-the-scenes look at how the facility is run.

== Facilities ==
=== Hotel ===
Yotel operates a hotel within Jewel, with approximately 130 rooms, which opened on 12 April 2019.

=== Aviation facilities ===
An "integrated multi-modal transport lounge" provides ticketing, boarding pass collection, and baggage transfer service in a single location. Early check-in facilities enable passengers to drop off luggage up to 24 hours ahead of regular check-in times.

=== Retail ===
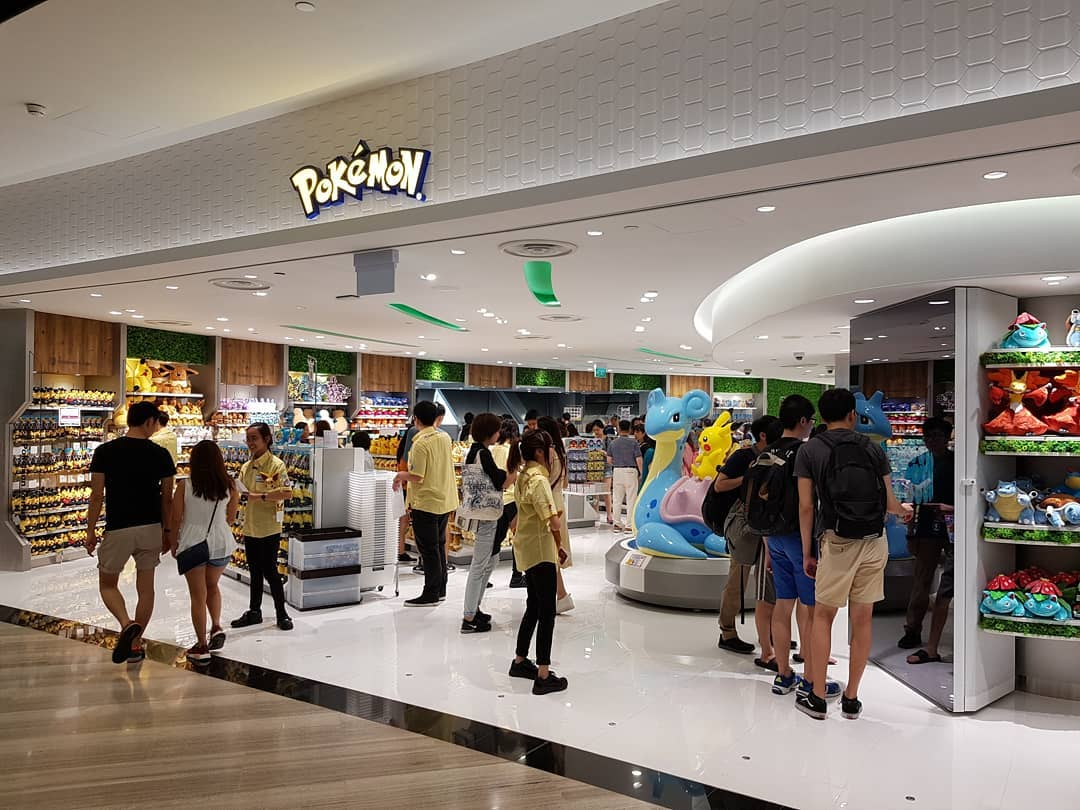
Pokémon Centre Singapore

Jewel houses both local and international brands, such as the first Apple Store located inside an airport complex and the first permanent Pokémon Center in Asia outside of Japan. Other tenants include: Muji, Zara, Uniqlo, Don Don Donki, Massimo Dutti, a Shaw Theatres cinema that includes an IMAX theatre, a FairPrice Finest supermarket, as well as a food court.

Jewel has a lineup of athleisure brands, such as Nike, Adidas, Descente, On, Fila, and New Balance. It also features a mix of local and international and local restaurant chains, such as A&W Restaurants, Jumbo Seafood, Shake Shack, Bee Cheng Hiang, Bengawan Solo, Ya Kun Kaya Toast, and Irvins.

== Awards ==
Jewel Changi Airport was accorded the 2016 International Architecture Award by the Chicago Athenaeum, an international museum of architecture and design.

In November 2019, the airport received the Special Jury Award at that year's Mapic Awards.

In 2024, it was publicly voted "My Favourite Shopping Mall" by the Singapore Retailers Association at the SRA Retail Awards.

Jewel Changi Airport also received Tripadvisor's 2025 Travellers' Choice Award, based on reviews from millions of travellers, ranking the airport among the top 10% worldwide.

== In popular culture ==
The song "The Right Time" by Singaporean singer JJ Lin was inspired by Jewel, which was featured in the music video.

It also appeared in Coldplay's music video for the 2024 song "Man in the Moon" and the fourth-season finale of "Hacks".

== See also ==
- Infrastructure of Singapore Changi Airport
