= Sophia Rabliauskas =

- Awards: Goldman Environmental Prize (2007); Order of Manitoba (2008)

Sophia Rabliauskas is an environmental activist and member of the Poplar River First Nation in Manitoba, Canada. She is known for her efforts to successfully secure protection of two million acres (8,000 km^{2}) of undisturbed forests in the Boreal region of Manitoba, for which she was awarded the Goldman Environmental Prize in 2007. She has since led community members in the creation of the first Asatiwisipe Aki Lands Management Plan, detailing plans for the sustainable management of Poplar River's natural resources. Rabliauskas was decorated Member of the Order of Manitoba in 2008. She is currently working to recognize over 43,000 km^{2} of boreal forest as a UNESCO World Heritage Site.

== Early life ==
Rabliauskas was born and raised in the Poplar River First Nation. Growing up, her father taught her countless lessons about keeping the land and the importance of only taking what is necessary. Her father provided for her family without outside help: in the fall and winter, he hunted moose and trapped rabbits in the bush; in the summer, he fished for pickerel in Lake Winnipeg; in the spring, he shot ducks and geese. Rabliauskas still lives in the Poplar region, where she raised four children with her husband Ray Rabliauskas. Fluent in Anishinaabe, she has worked as a language teacher and has led camps to connect both young people and adults with their culture.

== Environmental activism ==
Rabliauskas helped secure interim protective status - a temporary reprieve from logging, hydro, gas, and mining development - for their two million acres of undisturbed Boreal forest (three times the size of Rhode Island) in the Poplar River's traditional territory in Manitoba The Poplar River First Nation lands, located on the eastern side of Lake Winnipeg in Manitoba, form a significant part of the Boreal forest and houses 1200 members of the Ojibway First nations. - As first nations territory is legally public land in Canada, it is commonplace for provincial and federal agencies to grant long-term industry leases without consulting Indidigenous communities. The government of Manitoba has announced the intent to grant permanent protection to this territory yet to date has not granted that protection.

In 2004, Rabliauskas helped lead several other community members under the direction of Elders in developing the Asatiwisipe Aki Lands Management Plan, which is a comprehensive plan detailing how they will document, protect, and sustainably manage Poplar River's forests, wildlife, and other natural resources. Such a report is the first of its kind created for Canada's Boreal region. The report outlined components such as respecting traditional knowledge, benefiting from environmental analysis, developing economic opportunities, including protection of traditional hunting, trapping and fishing activities, and creating sustainable tourism opportunities.

Currently, Rabliauskas is a Spokesperson for Pimachiowin Aki, a group of First Nations from communities such as Bloodvein, Little Grand Rapids, and Pauingassi based in Manitoba and Ontario who goal is to secure over 43,000 km^{2} of untouched boreal forest as a UNESCO World Heritage Site to further ensure protections. A nomination was sent to UNESCO in January 2012. Canada's Boreal region, covering nearly 60,000 square kilometres and covering almost 90% of Manitoba, contains one quarter of the world's remaining forests and is a crucial buffer against climate change; its intact forests and wetlands store large amounts of carbon. The region's natural wealth also sustains hundreds of Aboriginal communities. Poplar River elders entrusted Sophia and Ray with documenting Oral history of the Anishinaabe people and culture for the purposes of their UNESCO proposal.

Rabliauskas says that her environmental activism is driven by a commitment to Anishinaabe elders and to honoring centuries of environmental stewardship.

== Honours and awards ==
- Earth Day Canada's Ongoing Commitment Award, June 2012, for her efforts to protect the lands in Poplar River's traditional territory in Manitoba
- Order of Manitoba, July 2008, Manitoba's highest honour awarded for excellence in any field that benefits the wellbeing of Manitoba and its residents
- Goldman Environmental Prize, 2007
