= Populus Seattle =

Hotel in Seattle, Washington, U.S.

- Logo

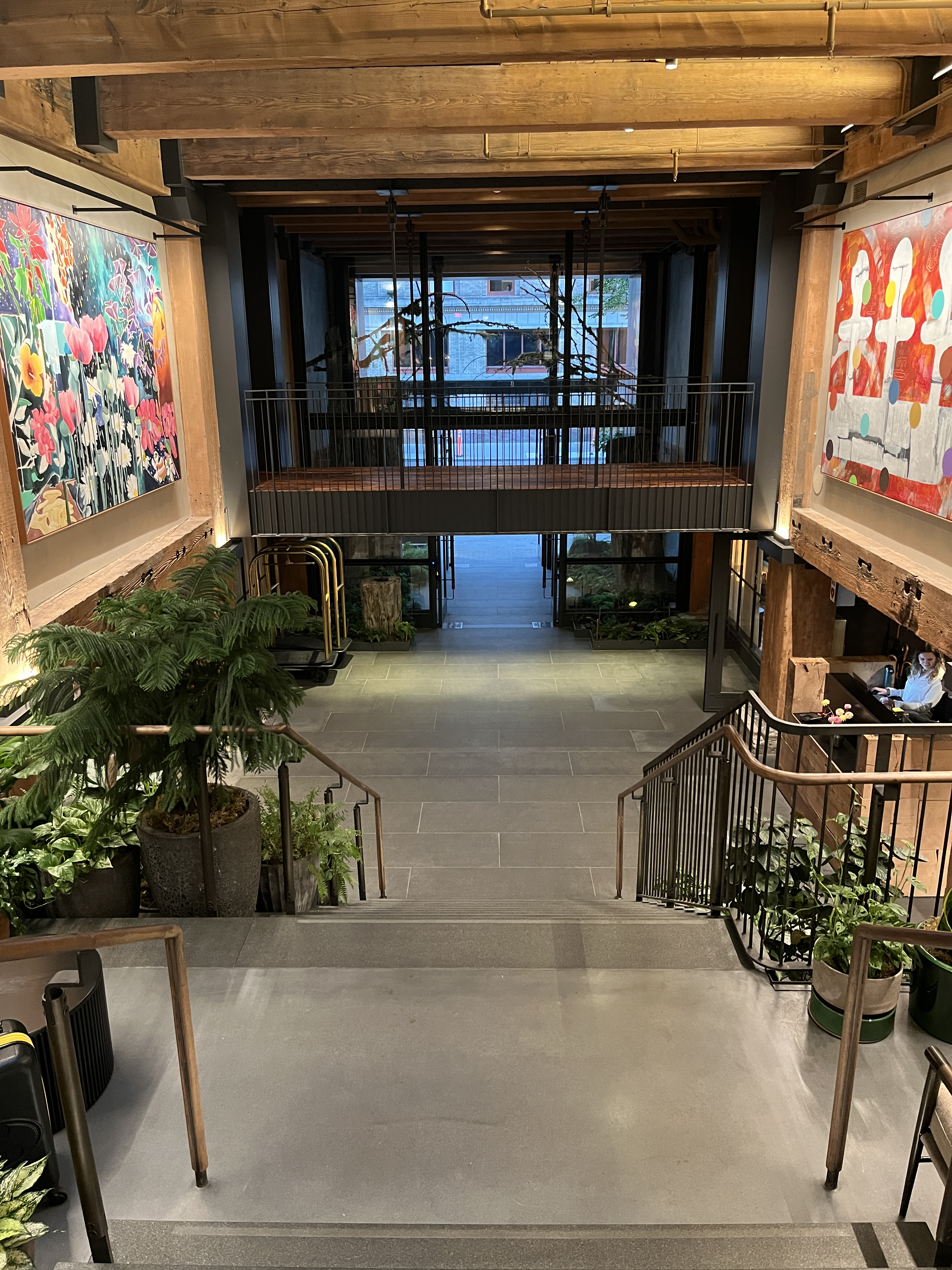
- The hotel's interior, 2025
- Interactive map of the Populus Seattle area

General information
- Location: 100 South King Street, Seattle, Washington, United States
- Coordinates: 47°35′55″N 122°20′2″W

Design and construction
- Awards and prizes: Michelin key

Website
- populusseattle.com

Populus Seattle is a 120-room luxury boutique hotel located in the Pioneer Square neighborhood close to the waterfront and cruise terminals of Seattle, Washington, United States. The hotel opened in May 2025 following the adaptive reuse of the Westland Building, a six-story brick structure originally completed in 1907. The hotel was developed by Urban Villages, which had opened another Populus hotel in Denver, Colorado in 2024.

== History ==
The Populus Hotel occupies the Westland Building, a former warehouse constructed in 1907 during Seattle's early 20th-century commercial expansion. The structure is located within the Pioneer Square Historic District and had been used for commercial and office purposes prior to redevelopment.

Urban Villages began planning the hotel conversion in the early 2020s, positioning the project as part of broader efforts to reinvest in Pioneer Square through adaptive reuse rather than ground-up construction. The hotel opened to guests in May 2025 following a multi-year renovation that preserved the building's historic exterior while reconfiguring its interior for hospitality use.

== Design ==
The hotel was designed by Seattle-based architecture firm The Miller Hull Partnership, which led the adaptive-reuse strategy for the historic structure. Design coverage highlighted the creation of a central lightwell and interior courtyard, referred to as a "garden sky court", intended to bring daylight and ventilation into the center of the building while organizing public spaces around it.

Interior spaces emphasize natural materials and restrained finishes, reflecting both the building's industrial history and the surrounding Pioneer Square context. Architectural publications noted that the renovation balanced contemporary hotel functions with preservation requirements associated with the building's historic status.

Design and development coverage described the project as emphasizing sustainability through adaptive reuse, reduced material waste, and energy-efficient building systems. By retaining the existing building structure, the redevelopment avoided the embodied carbon associated with demolition and new construction.

== Amenities ==
Food-and-beverage offerings at the hotel include the ground-floor restaurant Salt Harvest, which focuses on seasonal Pacific Northwest ingredients and serves as a neighborhood-oriented dining destination as well as a hotel amenity. The hotel also includes Firn, a rooftop bar and lounge space that opened to the public alongside the hotel. Local food and hospitality coverage described the venue as part of a broader trend of new dining and drinking destinations in Pioneer Square.

== Reception ==
Following its opening, Populus received coverage from local and national outlets focused on architecture, hospitality, and urban redevelopment. Review publications highlighted the adaptive-reuse approach and the integration of public spaces within a historic building. In 2025, the hotel received a Michelin Key from Michelin Guide, recognizing it for design, service, and overall guest experience.
