= Roberto Pane =

Italian art historian (1897–1987)

- Born: 21 November 1897; Taranto, Italy
- Died: 29 July 1987 (aged 89); Sorrento, Italy
- Occupation: Art historian

Roberto Pane (21 November 1897 – 29 July 1987) was an Italian art historian, art critic, architect and painter.

== Life and career ==
Born in Taranto, at a young age Pane moved with his family to Naples. After taking part in World War I as a volunteer, and participating in the Gabriele D'Annunzio-led occupation of Rijeka, in 1922 he graduated in architecture at the Sapienza University of Rome. In the 1920s he served as professor at the Classical Lyceum Umberto I in Naples, and collaborated with the Superintendency of Antiquities of Campania on several projects. Starting from 1924, he took part in several editions of the Venice Biennale, held several solo exhibitions, and cured several projects in Naples, including the Molosiglio Gardens, the restoration of the Madonna della Pace Church, and the African-Christianity pavilion at the 1940 Mostra d'Oltremare. In 1930 he became professor of architecture at the University of Naples Federico II, a role he held until 1942.

After debuting as an art critic in the journal Pan, Pane made his literary debut in 1936, with Architettura rurale campana ("Rural Architecture in Campania"), which was followed by Architettura del Rinascimento in Napoli ("Renaissance Architecture in Naples", 1937) and Architettura dell’età barocca in Napoli ("Baroque Age Architecture in Naples",1939). Characterized by noticeable Benedetto Croce's influences, his major work was Architettura e arti figurative ("Architecture and figurative arts", 1948).

Starting from the 1950s, Pane was a vocal opponent of the speculative construction and championed the inalterability of historic centres. He collaborated on restoration and landscape plans of various cities, and in 1969 he founded a postgraduate school specializing in monument restoration. He collaborated with various institutions including UNESCO, and served as president of the interdisciplinary coordination committee for the reconstruction following the 1980 Irpinia earthquake. Active until his later years, Pane died on 29 July 1987, at the age of 89.
