= Poplar River First Nation =

Ojibwa First Nation in Manitoba, Canada

- Band No. 277
- Azaadiwi-ziibing
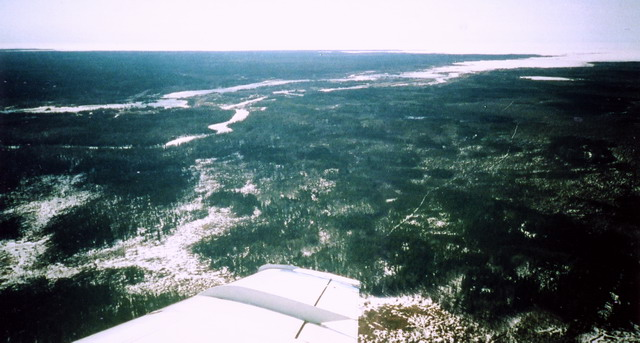
- Aerial view of Poplar River First Nation looking southwest.
- People: Ojibwe
- Treaty: Treaty 5
- Province: Manitoba

Land
- Main reserve: I.R. No. 16
- Land area: 15.378 km^{2} (5.937 sq mi)

Population (2019)
- On reserve: 1,340
- Off reserve: 601
- Total population: 1,941

Government
- Chief: Vera Mitchell

Tribal Council
- Southeast Resource Development Council

Website
- prfn.ca

Poplar River First Nation (Ojibwe: Azaadiwi-ziibing) is an Ojibwa First Nation in Manitoba, Canada. It is named after the Poplar River, which is the main river on which it resides.

Its landbase is the Poplar River 16, an Indian reserve located approximately on the east side of Lake Winnipeg at the mouth of the Poplar River. The largest city nearest this community is Winnipeg, located approximately 400 kilometres (250 mi) to the south.

The Southeast Resource Development Council is the Tribal Council affiliated with this First Nation. Poplar River is part of Treaty 5 Adhesion, signed on 20 September 1875.

== Demographics ==
Neginnan Harbour Authority

Poplar River First Nation is 3,800 acres (1,500 ha). As of 2013, the total population of registered First Nation peoples was 1,543, with 1245 on-reserve, and 298 off-reserve. The primary language spoken is Ojibwe, with some blending of the Cree dialect also known as Oji-Cree. The majority of surnames are Bruce, Franklin, and Berens.

There is an additional population consisting of Métis and non-status First Nations residing in the community, previously having a neighbouring Métis settlement, but it was abandoned.

The community has no municipality, district, or any other town associated or connected with it.

The two main religions practiced in Poplar River are Roman Catholic and Pentecostal.

== Community ==
The town itself is embedded along the main Poplar River with the primary township located on an atoll of land between Poplar River and Franklin River. The majority of the population resides along these two rivers, including three habitable islands located within the main Poplar River. Gravel highways exist throughout all of the community and bridges cross both rivers to connect all areas of the community. There are no paved concrete or asphalt roads or sidewalks.

Even though most people today use automobiles and walking power to travel the gravel paved roads, the use of watercraft and winter snowmobiles still remains.

Called Asatiwisipe Aki by the First Nation, their traditional land has been designated as a protected area with the support of the Manitoba government. It is one of the last remaining pristine river areas in the world, particularly in southern Canada. The river is very clean, with little or no man-made pollutants in the watershed. The Poplar River area may soon be designated as a section of a United Nations Heritage Site.

=== Amenities and businesses ===
Northern - General Merchandise Store

Northern, or The North West Company, is the largest business selling general merchandise ranging from household goods, food, petroleum products, electronics, clothing and more. Its predecessor was Hudson's Bay Company. The costs of goods in this community are higher than the Canadian average due to having to ship products via airplane, barge (during the summer months) or truck (during the winter months) from the main distribution outlets in Selkirk or Winnipeg, which are hundreds of kilometres south.

- Mitasosipe Trading Post is the second largest store selling general merchandise.
- Negginan Harbour Authority Inc. is the main small craft docking station which is officially governed by Fisheries and Oceans Canada.
- Poplar River Elder's Lodge is a care facility for Poplar River's elderly population.
- During the winter months, Poplar River is accessible via winter road. It is accessible year round via airplane, and via barge or water vessels during the summer months.
- The majority of residents have modern conveniences of running water, plumbing and trash removal.
- This community does not recycle.
- Children attend Poplar River Elementary School from grade 1 to 9. This school features a modern gymnasium, library and standard education programs. Members who pursue education beyond grade 9 must attend high schools, universities or colleges off reserve.
- Most members of this community have broadband internet access. In addition, many households own satellite receivers for their television entertainment needs.
- Youth of this community are influenced by national and international pop culture including music, movies and fashion trends from around the world due to satellite television and the internet.

== Environment ==
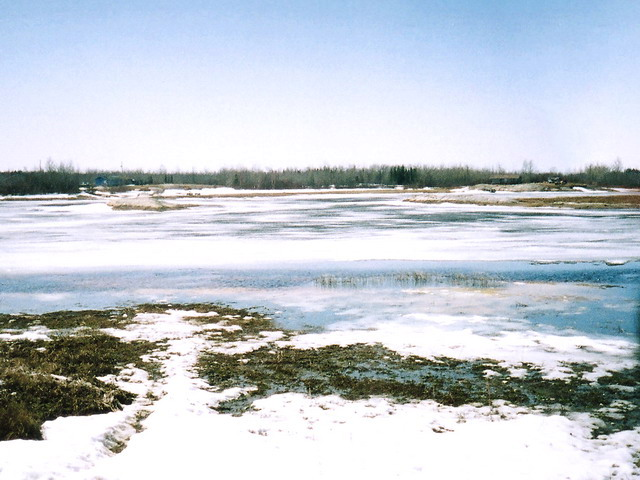
Spring thaw of Poplar River looking west

The water, land, forest and beaches continue to remain free of pollution and industrial activity.

The land is unfit for farming, so therefore self-sufficiency based on agriculture is not an option. Due to its geographic location during the Pleistocene period, or last ice age, this land was located under a large glacier that ploughed away the topsoils that are necessary for agriculture. Around 10 centimetres of soil exists covering clay sediment. This is evident during the warmer summer months when clay mud is prominent throughout most of the foot-travelled areas of the community.

This community is in the Boreal Forest range of Canada, is not within the region of permafrost, and is geographically closer to the North Pole to allow for what is locally referred to as the Northern Lights, or the more scientific term Aurora Borealis.

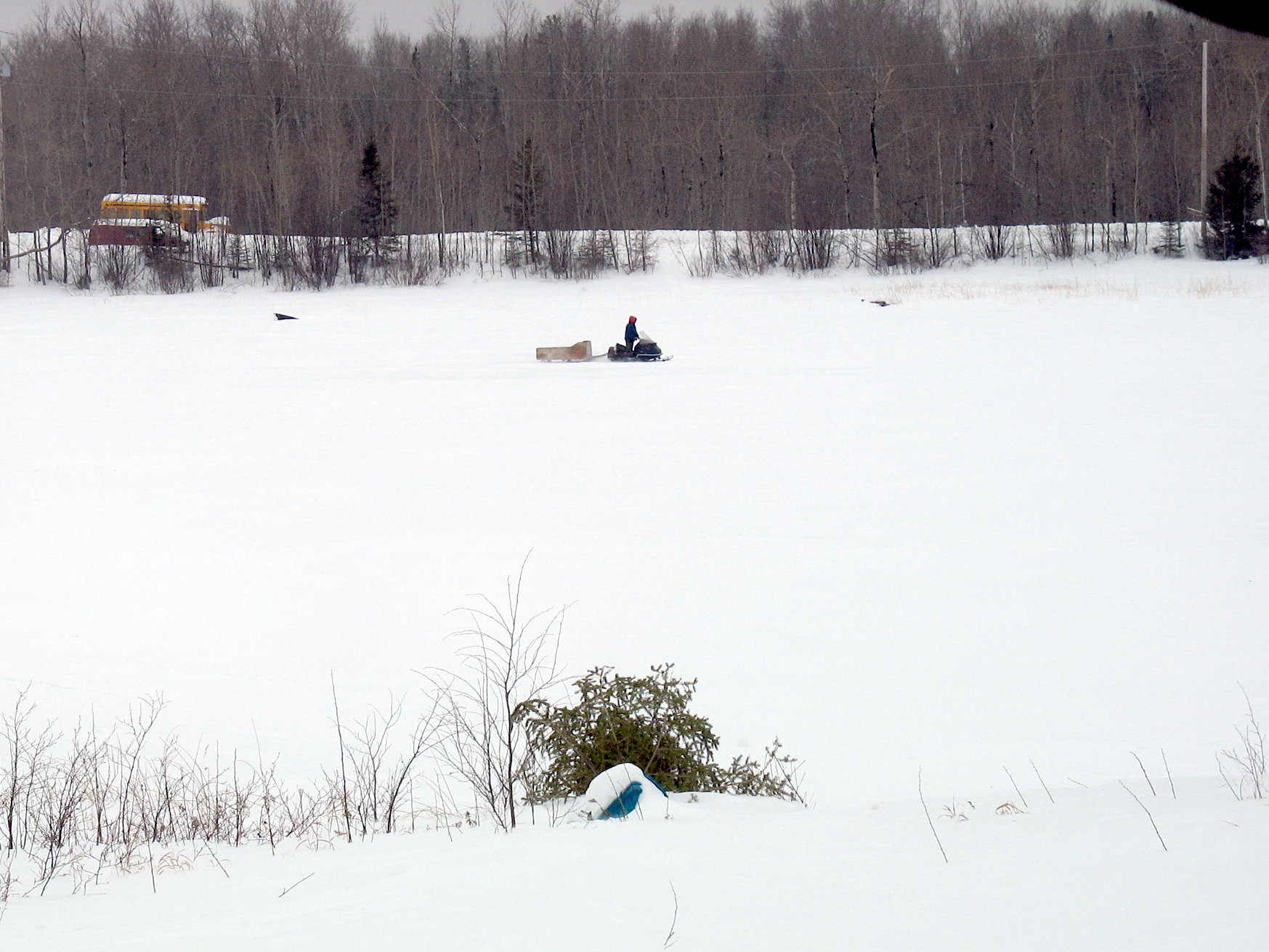
A community member rides a skidoo on the frozen Poplar River

== Health ==
The general overall state of health for the community is lower than the national average. Due to genetic predispositions that are known to influence the metabolism of aboriginals, the lack of education regarding proper nutrition and the importance of exercise, obesity and diabetes and all related illnesses are still a health threat to a portion of the population. Heart attacks are appearing to be more and more common-place for adults at the age of 50 years.

The extremely high rate of unemployment continues to be a problem, but this is the same for all First Nation communities. This is due to the lack of businesses or new enterprises that would normally provide employment for the people. A large portion of the population collects social assistance. The community has one of the lowest suicide rates compared to other First Nation communities.

Serious criminal activity is nearly non-existent, but drug trafficking, acts of violence and spousal abuse are common-place.

=== Alcoholism and drug addiction ===
Poplar River is a "dry" reserve, but prohibition laws are only enforced when citizens are acting irresponsibly or are a threat to others. Alcoholism occurs more prominently in certain families. There are no official studies to track alcoholism and its effects on the people.

Although alcohol can be smuggled in or obtained from bootleggers, the ease of drug smuggling is causing a dramatic increase in drug abuse causing serious addictions. The common drugs being used are marijuana, narcotic medication, cocaine and other illicit street drugs.

== Post-European contact ==
Historically, cross-cultural influence by early European settlers and their governments are believed to have been the source of many problems for aboriginal peoples. The attempted assimilation of aboriginals is a well-known failure, and the loss of the traditional culture and religious beliefs has created a strong sense of hostility, loss and hopelessness within many aboriginal communities.

More importantly, in more recent decades the sudden change to mainstream diet could also have negative side-effects, not just with members of this community, but for all First Nation people; on or off reserve. The introduction of additives to foods such as hormones, antibiotics, tranquilizers, excessively high sugar, salt, and other additives, and even caffeine, nicotine and alcohol, could cause chemical changes in the bodies of First Nation people interfering with mental wellness. None of these substances except nicotine existed in their lives for thousands of years. Studies have shown that chemical imbalances could lead to irrational thoughts and behaviours triggering lengthy episodes of depression, anxiety, hostility and dependence on alcohol or mood-altering prescription medication or illegal drugs. This would explain the high incidents of alcoholism, higher than average rates of suicide, as well as other social ills. A sedentary lifestyle devoid of physical exercise is also known to trigger lengthy negative emotional events. There have been no in-depth scientific studies or analysis into this particular area specifically targeted at the First Nation peoples.

It has been recently discovered that the return to traditional spiritual, cultural, familial and dietary lifestyles could provide a more healthy way of life for aboriginal communities. While fishing and hunting has been practised by the elders, this knowledge is being taught and passed on to future generations. The preservation of the Ojibwa dialect is also paramount, and the return to traditional spiritual healing ceremonies and medicines may also remedy the mental, physical and emotional ills that are of great concern to the community. These teachings are ongoing.

The people in this community still persevere to overcome adversity today.

== History of chiefs and councillors ==
Date	Chief	Councillors	Notes
2019	Larry Barker	Furlon Barker, Geoff Bushie, Henry Moneas, and Maurice Williams	
November 3, 2015		Clifford Bruce, James Mitchell, Guy Douglas, Emile Mason, Leonard Budd and Fred Mitchell.	
November 3, 2011	Russell Lambert	Eddie Hudson, Clifford Bruce, Emile Mason, Guy Douglas, Sophia Rabliauskas and Darrell Bruce.	
November 3, 2002	Russell Lambert	Clifford Bruce, Emile Mason, James Mitchell, Leonard Budd, Edwin Mitchell and Eddie Hudson.	
November 3, 2000	Vera Mitchell	James Mitchell, Fred Mitchell, Guy Douglas, Emile Mason, Edwin Mitchell and Clifford Bruce.	
November 3, 1998	Vera Mitchell	James Mitchell, Eddie Hudson, Guy Douglas, Fred Mitchell, Norman Bittern and Melvin Berens.	
November 3, 1996	Russell Lambert	Norman Bittern, Eddie Hudson, Irvine Franklin, James Mitchell, Emile Mason and Guy Douglas.	
November 3, 1994	Russell Lambert	Irvine Franklin, George Franklin, Albert Bittern, James Mitchell, Guy Douglas and Melvin Berens.	
November 3, 1992	Alex Hudson Sr.	Viola Bittern, Leonard Budd, Guy Douglas, Alex Timothy Hudson, Mary Eleanor Lambert and Emile Mason.	
November 3, 1990	Vera Mitchell	Melvin Berens, Guy Douglas, Ernest C. Bruce, Leonard Mitchell, Eleanor Lambert and Alex Timothy Hudson.	
November 3, 1988	Vera Mitchell	Leonard Mitchell, Norway Bittern, Guy Douglas, Albert Bittern, Melvin Bittern and Eddie Hudson.	
November 3, 1986	Alex Hudson	Eddie Hudson, Marc Hudson, Gordon Bittern Sr., Fred Mitchell, Peter Bittern and Albert Bittern.	
November 3, 1984	Alex Hudson	Fred Mitchell, Gordon Bittern Sr., Marc Hudson and Leonard Budd.	
November 3, 1982	Alex Hudson	Leonard Budd, Gordon Bittern, Mark Hudson and Freddie Mitchell.	
November 3, 1980	Albert Bittern	Phillip Bruce, William Fontaine, Margaret Hudson and Irvine Franklin.	
November 3, 1978	Albert Bittern	Peter Bittern, Jimmy Bruce, Phillip Bruce and Leonard Budd	
November 3, 1976	Norman Walter Bruce	Albert Bittern, Solomon Bruce, Franklin Mitchell and William Paul.	Norman W. Bruce resigned on 1 June 1977.
March 31, 1976	Norman Walter Bruce	Albert Bittern, Vernon George Franklin, Lillian Bittern, and Norman W. Bruce	
April 1, 1975	Jacob Green	Albert Bittern and Vernon George Franklin; Leonard Budd and Austin Franklin (till July 1975); Lillian Bittern and Norman W. Bruce (from 28 August 1975)	Leonard Budd resigned on 3 July 1975; and Austin Franklin resigned on 31 July 1975. Lillian Bittern and Norman W. Bruce elected on 28 August 1975. Jacob Green resigned on 16 March 1976, with Norman W. Bruce appointed Chief on March 31.
November 3, 1974 – March 3, 1975	George Boyd	Albert Bittern, Leonard Budd, Austin Franklin and Vernon George Franklin.	George Boyd resigned on 3 March 1975, and Jacob Green was appointed Chief on April 1.
November 3, 1974 – March 3, 1975	George Boyd	Leonard Budd, Albert Bittern, Austin Franklin and Walter Nanowin.	George Boyd resigned on 3 March 1975, and Jacob Green was appointed Chief on April 1.
November 3, 1972	Gordon Bittern	Valerie Boyd (1972–73); Bert Bruce, Lawrence Bruce, and Colin Bruce (all 1972–April 1974)	Valerie Boyd resigned on 19 November 1973. Gordon Bittern, Bert Bruce, Colin Bruce and Lawrence Bruce resigned on 11 April 1974.
September 13, 1971	Philip Bruce	Bert Bruce, Lillian Bittern, William Fontaine, and William Bruce	Alex Hudson resigned on 13 September 1971 and Philip Bruce appointed as Chief.
October 21, 1970	Alex Hudson	Bert Bruce, Philip Bruce, Lillian Bittern, William Fontaine, and William Bruce	Vernon Franklin and Victor Bruce resigned on 8 February 1970, and were replaced by William Fontaine and William Bruce on February 27.
October 7, 1968	Alex Hudson	Bert Bruce, Philip Bruce, Vernon Franklin (1967–70), and Victor Bruce	Vernon Franklin and Victor Bruce resigned on 8 February 1970, and were replaced by William Fontaine and William Bruce on February 27.
October 22, 1966	Gordon Bittern	Bert Bruce, Norman Bruce (1966–67), Vernon Franklin (1967–70), and Philip Bruce	Councillor Norman Bruce resigned on 16 October 1967, and was replaced by Vernon Franklin.
October 20, 1962	Gordon Bittern	William Bruce and Fred Lambert	
October 20, 1960	Alex Hudson	William Bruce and Leonard Mitchell	
October 27, 1958	Jacob Bruce	William Bruce and Alex Mitchell	
October 18, 1956	Gordon Bittern	Roderick Douglas and Charles Franklin	
November 23, 1953	Alex Hudson	Fred Lambert and William Bruce	
June 12, 1950		Jacob Bruce and Thomas Douglas	
June 17, 1933	Cuthbert Nanowin	Jacob Bruce and James Bruce	
August 12, 1926	Miles Michel	Sandy Bruce and Cuthbert Nanowin	
August 19, 1924		Miles Michel and Cuthbert Nanowin	
July 25, 1885 –August 24, 1923		Jacob Nanowin, Henry Bittern (July 11, 1912 – 1912), and Miles Michel (1914–1914)	Death of Jacob Nanowin was shown on paylist 24/8/23.
