= Poplar, Virginia =

Unincorporated community in Virginia, United States

Coordinates: 38°00′51″N 77°24′43″W

Poplar is an unincorporated community in Caroline County, in the U.S. state of Virginia.
