= Kazimierz Ferenc =

Polish politician (1944–2024)

Voivode of Rzeszów
- In office 23 May 1990 – 9 February 1994
- Preceded by: Henryk Ficek
- Succeeded by: Kazimierz Surowiec

Personal details
- Born: Kazimierz Zygmunt Ferenc; 20 July 1944 Rzeszów, General Government
- Died: 8 November 2024 (aged 80)
- Party: KO "S" (1989–1992); SLCh (1992–1997); SKL (1997–2001); PO (2001–2024)
- Education: Cracow University of Technology
- Occupation: Architect

Kazimierz Zygmunt Ferenc (20 July 1944 – 8 November 2024) was a Polish architect and politician. A member of the Solidarity Citizens' Committee and the Christian-Peasant Party, he served as Voivode of Rzeszów from 1990 to 1994.

Ferenc died on 8 November 2024, at the age of 80.
