= Renato De Fusco =

Italian architectural historian (1929–2024)

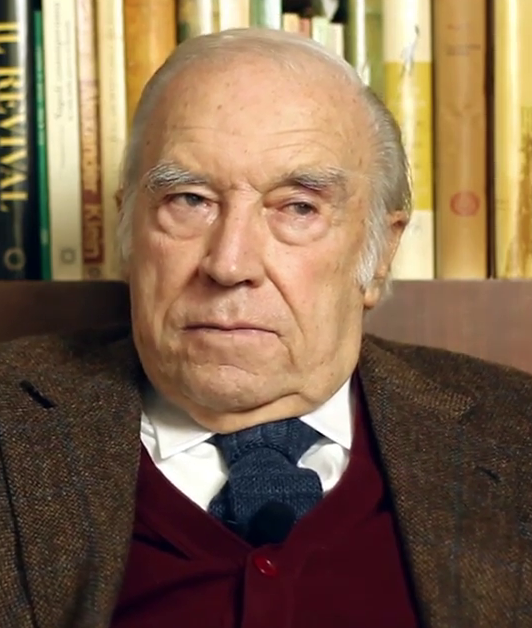
- De Fusco in 2013
- Born: 14 July 1929; Naples, Kingdom of Italy
- Died: 30 April 2024 (aged 94); Naples, Italy
- Occupation: Architectural historian

Renato De Fusco (14 July 1929 – 30 April 2024) was an Italian architectural historian, art theorist and academic. He was professor emeritus of the University of Naples Federico II.

== Life and career ==
Born in Naples, De Fusco studied architecture at the University of Naples Federico II, graduating in 1959. Initially interested in painting, he was part of the art movements "Gruppo Sud" and "MAC (Movimento Arte Concreta)".

After working as a designer and as an architect for a series of projects, notably a complex of public housing buildings in the Montedonzelli neighborhood in his hometown, and after collaborating with the Institute of Architectural History directed by Roberto Pane and with the magazine Casabella, in 1961 he started his academic journey in his alma mater, first as a lecturer and starting from 1972 as an ordinary professor. In 1964, he founded the architectural and art journal Op.cit.selezione della critica d'arte contemporanea, which he directed for sixty years, until his death.

De Fusco was author of dozens of books, starting from the late 1950s. First close to Roberto Pane's theories, he developed a personal research and theoretical perspective, starting from his 1964 history of modern architectural criticism L'idea di architettura ('The Idea of Architecture'). Among his most important works, Architettura come mass medium ('Architecture as a mass medium', 1967), Storia dell’architettura contemporanea ('History of contemporary architecture', 1974), Il progetto d'architettura ('The Architectural Project', 1983), Storia del design ('History of Design', 1985), Mille anni di architettura in Europa ('One thousand years of architecture in Europe', 1993), Trattato di architettura ('Treatise on architecture', 2001), and Filosofia del design ('Design philosophy', 2012).

During his career De Fusco received various honors and awards, notably a Golden Compass for his career in 2008. He died on 30 April 2024, at the age of 94.
