= Poplar Island (Prince Edward Island) =

Island in Prince Edward Island, Canada

- Location within Prince Edward Island

Geography
- Location: Northumberland Strait
- Coordinates: 46°15′34″N 63°10′49″W

Administration
- Canada
- Province: Prince Edward Island
- County: Queens
- Township: Queens

Additional information
- Time zone: Atlantic Time Zone (UTC-4)
  - Summer (DST): Atlantic Time Zone (UTC-3)

Poplar Island is a small island of Canada located off the west coast of Charlottetown, Prince Edward Island. It is within Charlottetown city limits, in the North River of Charlottetown Harbour, less than a quarter mile east of the town of Cornwall. It is connected to both sides of the river via Causeways, over which Prince Edward Island Route 1 runs.
