= Lynn Kinnear =

British landscape architect (1960–2024)

- Born: February 15, 1960; Edinburgh, Scotland
- Died: March 9, 2024 (aged 64); London, England
- Occupation: Landscape architect
- Known for: Walthamstow Wetlands; Burntwood School; Brentford High Street; Helling Street Park
- Notable work: Walsall Art Gallery; Normand Park; Chobham Academy; Mossbourne Academy; Crystal Palace Park
- Spouse: Sean Griffiths (separated)
- Awards: RIBA Stirling Prize (2015); Landscape Institute President's Award; Landscape Institute Award (2017)

Lynn Kinnear (15 February 1960 - 9 March 2024) was a British landscape architect known for designing award-winning parks and playgrounds. She won the RIBA Stirling Prize in 2015 for her work with Allford Hall Monaghan and Morris on Burntwood School, Wandsworth.

== Early life ==
Lynn Kinnear was born on 15 February 1960 in Edinburgh, Scotland. Her mother was Margaret Jeffcock and her father was George Kinnear. Her father worked for Edinburgh City Council. She had three younger sisters: Jo, Susie and Sally.

Kinnear attended the James Gillespie's High School.

Her maternal grandfather, Ernest Jeffcock, was a builder and encouraged Kinnear to study architecture. Kinnear studied landscape architecture at Heriot-Watt University, where she was taught by David Skinner.

== Career ==
After university, Kinnear worked for the landscape architects Gillespies where she was involved in designing for the Liverpool International Garden Festival in 1984. She then joined the SOM international architecture practice where she worked on the Canary Wharf development in London.

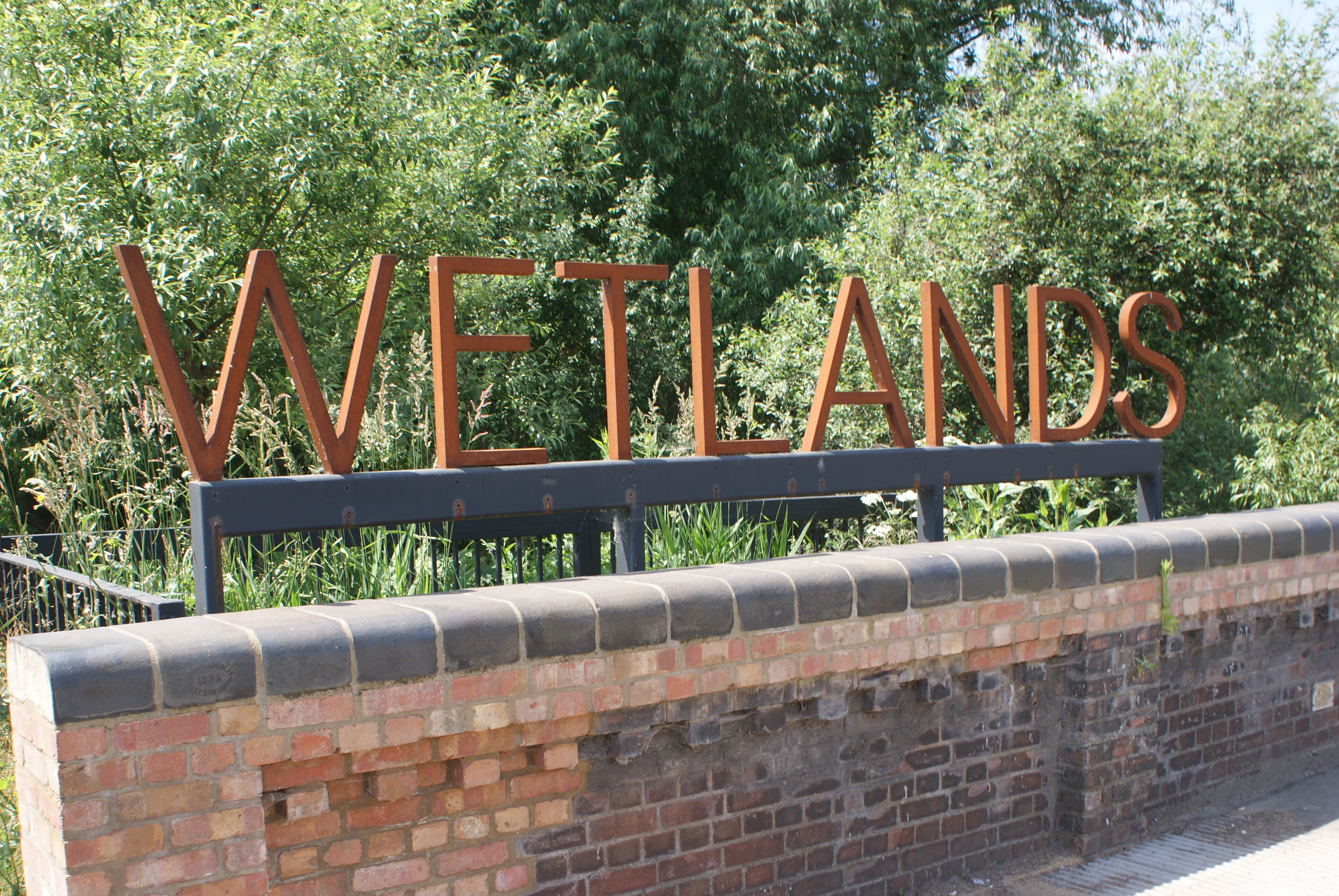
Forest Road entrance of the Walthamstow Wetlands

In 1991, Kinnear set up her own practice, Kinnear Landscape Architects (KLA), as she wanted to work more with local communities in developing spaces. Her work was influenced by continental European landscape architects such as West 8, and she saw landscape as integral to a development's design rather than secondary to buildings.

By 1992, Kinnear was a lecturer at the University of Greenwich.

In 1995 she created the Hellings Street Park in Wapping, London. In 2014, she redesigned Brentford High Street to increase pedestrian use. She won the Landscape Institute's President's Award for this work. She also won the Landscape Institute's Award for her work at Walthamstow Wetlands in 2017.

As well as individual schemes, Kinnear created strategic visions for Ingrebourne Valley Greenway and Tottenham Hale Green and Open Spaces.

=== Selected works ===
Some of the schemes she designed include:

- Walsall Art Gallery (with Caruso St John and Richard Wentworth)
- Walthamstow Wetlands nature reserve
- Helling Street Park, Wapping
- Burntwood School (with AHMM)
- Drapers Fields
- Normand Park
- Chobham Academy, Newham
- Daubeney School, Hackney
- Mossbourne Academy (with RSHP)
- Tower Hamlets Town Hall (with AHMM)
- Barking Market
- Crystal Palace Park

== Personal life ==
Kinnear met the architect Sean Griffiths in 1992, and they had one daughter, Lily. Kinnear and Griffiths built the Blue House in east London in 2002. Kinnear also had a house at Camber Sands Kinnear lived in the Blue House until her death.

Kinnear and Griffiths separated in 2008.

In 2017, Kinnear was diagnosed with cancer. She continued to work until 2023, when she closed her practice. She died on 9 March 2024.
