= Poplar River (Manitoba) =

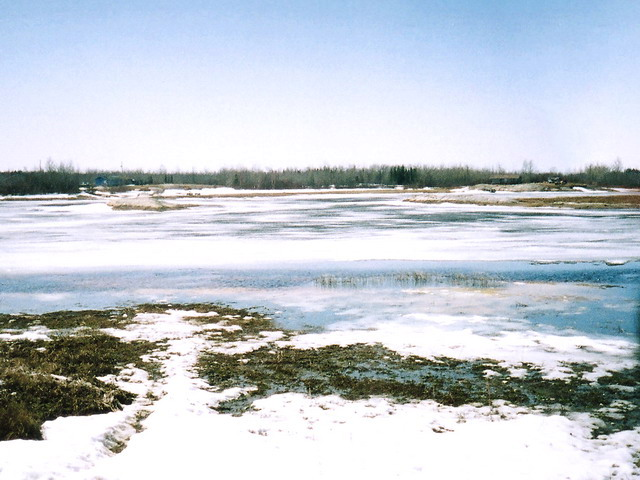
- Spring thaw on Poplar River, looking West (taken at Poplar River First Nation)

- Location of the river mouth in Manitoba
- Native name: Negginan (Ojibwe)

Location
- Country: Canada
- Provinces: Manitoba; Ontario

Physical characteristics
- Source: Unnamed lake
  - location: Kenora District, Ontario
  - coordinates: 52°24′23″N 94°36′54″W
  - elevation: 348 m (1,142 ft)
- Mouth: Lake Winnipeg
  - location: Manitoba
  - coordinates: 52°59′46″N 97°18′01″W
  - elevation: 217 m (712 ft)

Basin features
- River system: Hudson Bay drainage basin

The Poplar River is a river in Manitoba and Ontario, Canada. It is in the Hudson Bay drainage basin and flows to the eastern shore of Lake Winnipeg. The river passes through one of the last, large, and intact boreal forests in the world.

== Course ==
The river begins at an unnamed lake in Kenora District in Northwestern Ontario. It flows west to the Manitoba border before reaching its mouth at Lake Winnipeg. Lake Winnipeg flows via the Nelson River to Hudson Bay.

== First Nations ==
The Poplar River's Ojibwe name is Negginan meaning "my home". Poplar River lies near the Asatiwisipe River. It is a protected river with pristine forests and many undeveloped lakes and creeks along it. This watershed is the traditional land use area for Poplar River First Nation. The Ojibwe still use the land and waters for hunting, fishing, and gathering wild foods and medicines. The First Nation community has designated their traditional lands as a protected area with the support of Manitoba's government.

== Natural history ==
The river is a part of a proposed United Nations World Heritage Site to protect the large intact area of wilderness along Lake Winnipeg and in northwestern Ontario. This wilderness river is one of the few rivers in southern Canada that is still very pristine and clean, with little or no development along the shoreline and in the entire watershed. There are no major mines, roads, hydro, or logging areas in the region. The area provides an essential habitat for a segment of the threatened woodland caribou, and also protects habitat for the chestnut lamprey, a species of special concern. Numerous archaeological sites and pictographs exist, helping to demonstrate that the area has long been of special significance to First Nations.

The river is a popular destination for fishing, canoeing, ecotourism, and sightseeing. The water is very warm in the summer and fall for swimming, unlike glacier and mountain fed waters. There are many cliffs, rapids, and waterfalls along the river. The area has woodland caribou, Hudson Bay wolves, black bears, Canada lynx, bobcats, and remote beaches. Many species of birds nest in the region, including the bald eagle and the great grey owl.

== See also ==
- List of rivers of Manitoba
- List of rivers of Ontario
