= Aida Cruz =

Filipino architect (1922–2024)

- Born: July 5, 1922; Laguna, Philippines
- Died: May 20, 2024 (aged 101)
- Education: University of Santo Tomas
- Occupation: Architect
- Spouse: Jose Del Rosario

Aida Cruz (July 5, 1922 – May 20, 2024) was a Filipino architect.

== Life ==
Born in Laguna in 1922, Cruz's sculptor father, Amado, convinced her to become an architect instead of her original desire to be a dentist. Cruz graduated from the University of Santo Tomas in 1947 with a degree in architecture. She placed seventh in the licensure exam, making her the first registered female architect in the Philippines the next year.

Along with her husband Jose Del Rosario, a civil engineer, Cruz designed about 120 homes, edifices, and hospitals in the Philippines, including parts of the University of Baguio. She died in 2024.

== Legacy ==
Beyond her work, Cruz is admired because she pursued a career in a male-dominated field at a time when women's rights were just starting to get recognized in the Philippines. Women's suffrage was only allowed in the country in 1937.
