= Alan Choe =

Singaporean architect and urban planner (1931–2024)

Alan Choe DUBC PPA PJG
- Choe in 1988
- Born: 6 March 1931; Colony of Singapore, Straits Settlements, British Malaya
- Died: 27 May 2024 (aged 93); Singapore
- Education: University of Melbourne
- Occupations: Architect and urban planner

Alan Fook Cheong Choe (Chinese: 曹福昌; Jyutping: co^{4} fuk^{1} coeng^{1}; 6 March 1931 – 27 May 2024) was a Singaporean architect and urban planner. He was a city planner with the Housing and Development Board and a founding member of the Urban Redevelopment Authority. He was a recipient of Singapore's Public Administration Medal (Gold) in 1967 and the Meritorious Service Medal in 1990, and was inducted into the Distinguished Service Order in 2001.

== Early life ==
Choe was born on 6 March 1931 in a family of four siblings. His father died when he was one, and he was raised by his mother who was a seamstress. He studied at Singapore's Pearl's Hill School and Raffles Institution before moving to Australia for his higher studies. He graduated with a bachelor's degree in architecture and a diploma in town and regional planning from the University of Melbourne. He followed it up with a fellowship diploma from Royal Melbourne Institute of Technology.

== Career ==
Choe began his career working for architectural firms in both Australia and Singapore. In 1960, at the age of 29, he was recruited by the newly established Housing and Development Board (HDB), becoming its first architect-planner. His initial task was to complete the development of Singapore's first satellite town, Queenstown, a project initiated in the 1950s by the British Singapore Improvement Trust. It is noted that Choe had to complete the development of two among the five neighborhoods that made up Queenstown after the British architects who had started the project had to leave mid way.

In 1964, Choe was appointed to head HDB's Urban Renewal Unit, which later evolved into the Urban Redevelopment Authority (URA) in 1974. His work with international experts, including Norwegian town planner Erik Lorange, helped lay the groundwork for Singapore's urban renewal strategies. Choe's vision extended to the preservation of Singapore's historical areas, advocating for the conservation of Chinatown, Little India, and Serangoon long before heritage conservation became a governmental priority.

During his tenure, Choe oversaw the urban renewal of the city state's central area, addressing housing shortages and initiating the Government Land Sales Programme in 1967. This program allowed private developers to play a significant role in Singapore's urban development and the build out of present day landmarks like the Marina Bay, the Golden Mile Complex, and the People's Park Complex.

After leaving public service in 1978, Choe joined the architectural firm RSP Architects Planners & Engineers, contributing to projects like Parkway Parade and the Monetary Authority of Singapore Building. He also contributed to the development of the Singapore Indoor Stadium.

Choe's influence extended to Sentosa, where he served as a board member and later as chairman of the Sentosa Development Corporation (SDC) from 1985 to 2001. His efforts transformed Sentosa from a military base into a recreational and residential destination, introducing Fort Siloso and the island's monorail system.

Choe received numerous awards, including the Public Administration Medal (Gold) in 1967 and the Meritorious Service Medal in 1990. He was named in the Singapore National Day awards and inducted into the Distinguished Service Order in 2001. In 2004, he was awarded the Gold Medal by the Singapore Institute of Architects, for his contributions to architecture and urban planning.

== Personal life and death ==
Choe was married and had five children. He died on 27 May 2024, at the age of 93.
