= Popular =

Popularity or social status is the quality of being well liked, admired or well known to a particular group.

Popular may also refer to:

== In sociology ==
- Popular culture
- Popular fiction
- Popular music
- Popular science
- Populace, the total population of a certain place
  - Populism, a political philosophy, based on the idea that the common people are being exploited.
- Informal usage or custom, as in popular names, as opposed to formal or scientific nomenclature

== Companies ==
- Popular, Inc., also known as Banco Popular, a financial services company
- Popular Holdings, a Singapore-based educational book company
- The Popular (department store), a chain of department stores in El Paso, Texas, from 1902 to 1995

== Media ==
=== Music ===
- "Popular" (Darren Hayes song) (2004), on the album The Tension and the Spark
- "Popular" (Eric Saade song) (2011), on the album Saade Vol. 1
- "Popular" (M.I.A. song) (2022), from the album Mata
- "Popular" (Nada Surf song) (1996), on the album High/Low
- "Popular" (The Veronicas song) (2008), on the album Hook Me Up
- "Popular" (Wicked song) (2003), in the musical Wicked
- "Popular" (The Weeknd, Playboi Carti and Madonna song) (2023), from the album The Highlights (Deluxe)
- "Popular Song" (Mika song) (2012), from the album The Origin of Love and Yours Truly
- Popular, an unreleased album by Van Hunt
- "Popular", a song by The Anchoress on the 2015 album Confessions of a Romance Novelist
- "Popular", a song by Lil Wayne on the 2010 album I Am Not a Human Being

== Printed media ==
- The Popular Magazine, an American literary magazine that ran for 612 issues from November 1903 to October 1931
- Popular, an Indonesian men's lifestyle magazine
- Popular: Finding Happiness and Success in a World That Cares Too Much About the Wrong Kinds of Relationships, a book by psychology professor Mitch Prinstein

=== Other media ===
- Popular (TV series), a teenage dramedy on the WB network

== See also ==
- Poplar (disambiguation)
- Populaire (disambiguation), French for popular
- Populous (disambiguation)
