= Populus Denver =

Hotel in Colorado, US

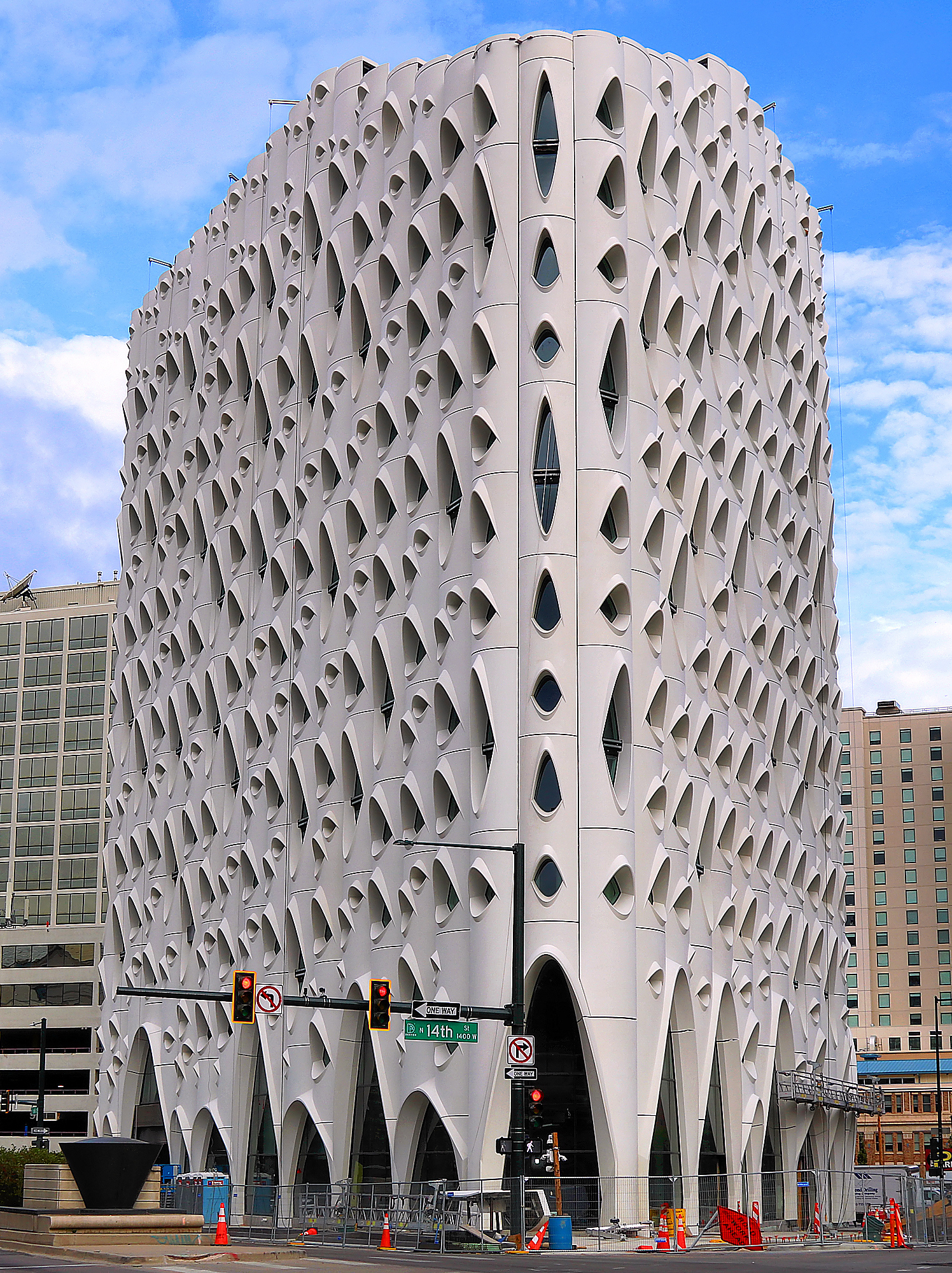
- The hotel's exterior, 2024
- Interactive map of the Populus Denver area

General information
- Location: 240 14th Street Denver, Colorado, US 80202
- Coordinates: 39°44′25″N 104°59′28″W
- Opening: October 2024
- Operator: Aparium Hotel Group

Height
- Architectural: 159 ft (48 m)

Technical details
- Floor count: 13

Design and construction
- Architect: Studio Gang
- Developer: Urban Villages

Other information
- Number of rooms: 265

Website
- populusdenver.com

Populus Denver is a 13-story hotel located adjacent to the Denver Civic Center, Colorado, United States, and contains 265 guest rooms. Developed by Denver-based real estate company Urban Villages, the hotel exterior is designed by the architecture firm Studio Gang, which took inspiration from the bark of Populus tremuloides (quaking aspen). Planning of the hotel was started since the rights of the property were acquired in 2016. Its construction started post-COVID-19 pandemic, and the hotel was opened to guests in October 2024.

It has drawn praise in national media due to having plans and operations that are claimed to be helpful for a "carbon-positive" environment. The hotel promotes a "One Night One Tree" program, where a tree is planted for every night a guest stays. Time and Esquire magazines named it as one of the world's "Greatest Places" and "Best New Hotels" of 2025 respectively, due to its hospitality and sustainability measures in revitalizing the Civic Center.

== Plan ==
During the COVID-19 pandemic when the hospitality industry was experiencing a downturn, local real estate company Urban Villages publicly unveiled the name and renderings of the Populus Denver, and framed the project as a long-term, counter-cyclical investment based on expectations that travel demand and civic events would rebound by the time the building opened. They had acquired control of the site in early 2016 after purchasing the property from the City and County of Denver and a private partner for $2.5 million. Their earlier plans for the hotel had focused on micro-apartments, but the program was later revised to emphasize hotel use for the revitalization of the Denver Civic Center.

Populus occupies a triangular site bounded by West Colfax Avenue, 14th Street, and Court Place in downtown Denver, directly across from the Civic Center. Construction began in April 2022 and continued through 2024, a period marked by elevated material costs and labor constraints stemming from the COVID-19 pandemic. The project topped out in 2023, with interior buildout and systems commissioning continuing into 2024. It opened to guests in October 2024. Reportedly, the building height is 159 ft (48 m) and it covers about 135,000 sq ft (12,500 m^{2}).

Reportedly, the hotel claims to be a "carbon-positive" building (net negative emissions) by sequestering more carbon dioxide than it emits through construction and ongoing operations. In 2022, the developers partnered with the United States Forest Service and funded the planting of tens of thousands of Engelmann spruce trees in Colorado. However, a large number of those died due to extreme weather. In 2024, a "One Night One Tree" program was started to appeal to guests: the management would plant one tree for each night they stay in the hotel, continuing the aim in subsequent years in partnership with the National Forest Foundation. The hotel has a built-in dashboard to display the carbon offset through online monitoring. (Note: Management and planning contexts are gathered from the references such as Outside magazine, The New York Times, Time magazine, 5280 magazine, and The Guardian.)

== Design and amenities ==
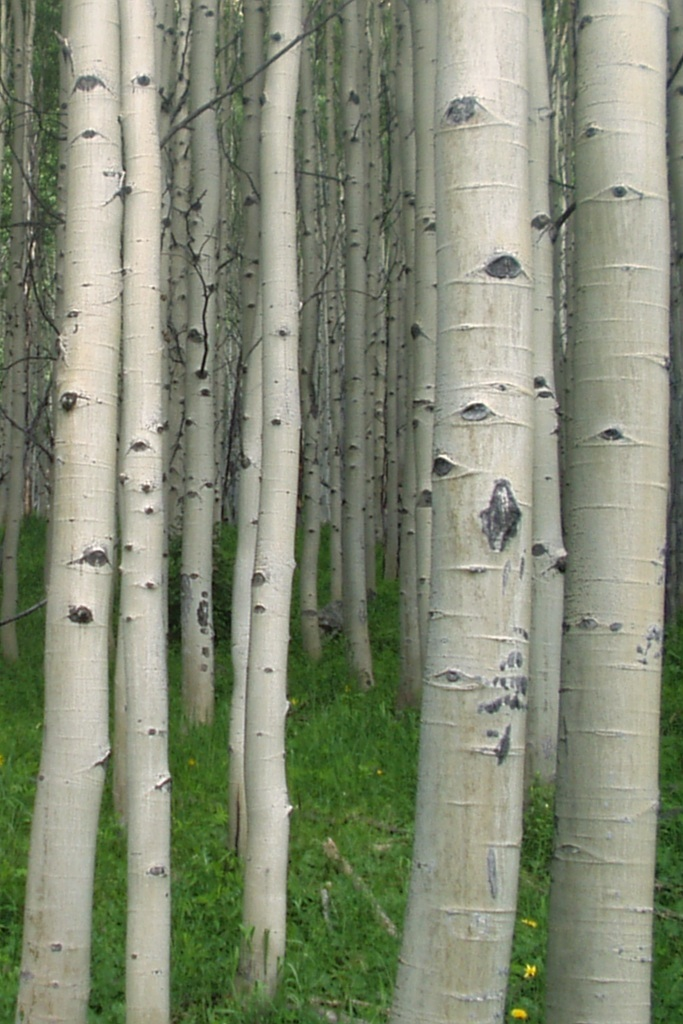
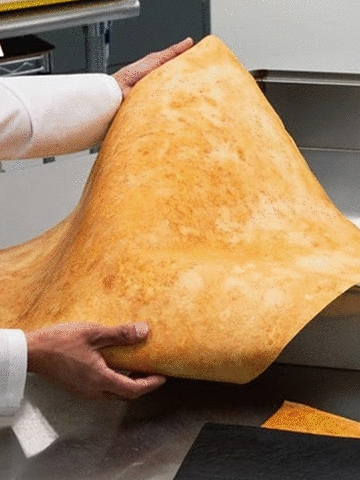
The windows architecture on the building is inspired by the lenticels found on quaking aspen trees (left), and the ground floor features Reishi, a mycelium leather designed by MycoWorks (sample pictured right).

Operated by the Aparium Hotel Group, the hotel is designed by Studio Gang, marking the firm's first completed project in Colorado. Its structural engineering consultancy is provided by Studio NYL, with interior spaces designed by Wildman Chalmers and Fowler Design, while curated by a local environmentalist Katherine Homes. (Note: Credits are collected as mentioned in primary sources such as Studio Gang, Wildman Chalmers, and Fowler Design, as well as in secondary sources such as Arch Daily, American Society of Civil Engineers, and Boutique Hotel News.)

The structure is made from cold-formed steel with no right angle in its architecture, along with a low-carbon concrete mix. The building envelope is reported to have a biomimetic facade cladded with large glass fiber reinforced concrete panels to reduce thermal bridging by less use of anchors. It features 365 irregularly shaped, vertically oriented window openings that are designed to provide shading and protection from rainwater. The windows are inspired by the dark lenticels found on the bark of quaking aspen trees, and thus the hotel's name is derived from the tree's scientific name, Populus tremuloides. The windows of up to 30 ft (9.1 m) height act as entrances on the ground floor.

The lobby features recycled materials, with walking surface decorations resembling the forest floor, along with the reception desk made from the felled cottonwood tree, wall decorations from beetle-kill pine, and the ceiling decorations from reclaimed lumber snow fences. The hallway features a dark theme to evoke the nature-inspired experience of being inside a treehouse. The hotel uses renewable electricity and relies on nearby public facilities for car parking instead of having a built-in garage, though it provides a valet parking service to the guests and has bicycle parking racks available.

It is a 13-story building. The ground floor features a lobby having Little Owl Coffee, a shop, and Pasque, a restaurant named after a flower and featuring an overhead sculptural installation made from Reishi, a mycelium leather. The floor just above has some of its amenities, including a library, a fitness center, and meeting and gathering spaces, while the rooftop floor has Stellar Jay, a bar named after a bird and featuring an in-house seating environment like a tree canopy along with a public terrace with a view towards the Civic Center. An on-site biodigester processes food waste into local fertilizer. The rest of the floors in between contain 265 guest rooms with eco-friendly accessories, and the guests are given wooden room keys with biodegradable sleeves containing wildflower seeds, which can be planted once they leave. (Note: Pieces of information are gathered from multiple sources like Domus, Outside magazine, Design Milk, The Denver Post, 5280 magazine, The New York Times, Vogue, Above Par, and My Modern Met.)

Populus Seattle, a similar hotel also by Urban Villages, opened in Seattle in 2025.

== Reception ==
Local viewers and publishers found the structure's facade appearance similar to a cheese grater, (Note: The architectural context is found in the references such as Westword, 5280 magazine, Above Par, and Time Out magazine.) or windows like the eyelids due to their shape termed as "aspen eyes" and how their lids open outward. (Note: The architectural context is found in the references such as Arch Daily, Wallpaper magazine, Outside magazine, Design Milk, Time magazine, Domus, and The Style Mate.) Some reviewers also appreciated the use of Reishi, which is designed by a biotech firm, MycoWorks, for providing a soothing scent to entering guests. (Note: The fashion context is found in the references such as 5280 magazine, Aspire Metro, Time Out magazine, and Outside magazine.)

In 2025, Time included Populus on its list of the "World's Greatest Places", citing the hotel's biophilic design, rooftop amenities, and sustainability narrative, and Esquire named it in its list of the "Best New Hotels in the World", calling it a "revolutionary property" with the "idea of honoring nature". It won the Glass Magazine Award for Best Green Project due to its climate-conscious design in reducing its carbon footprint and received a Michelin Key from the Michelin Guide, recognizing excellence in design, service, and overall character. It was also awarded by the Council on Tall Buildings and Urban Habitat as one of the "Best Tall Buildings" for its sustainability measures, and is certified as LEED Gold by the U.S. Green Building Council.

== See also ==
- Sustainable architecture
- Carbon offsets and credits
