= Changi Exhibition Centre =

Convention center in Singapore

Coordinates: 1°21′50.49″N 104°01′19.75″E

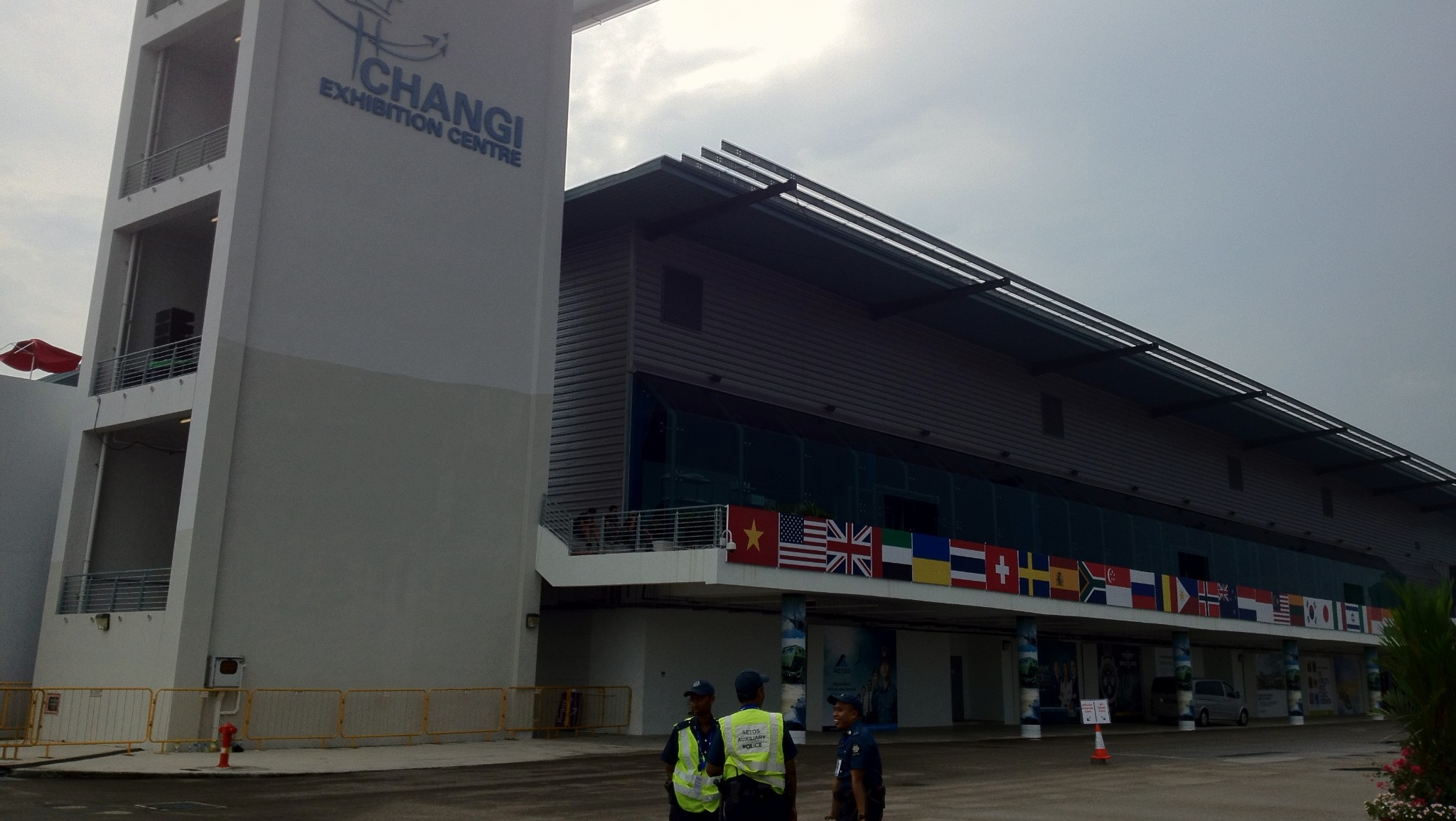
Changi Exhibition Centre

The Changi Exhibition Centre (CEC) is a convention center in Singapore located on a plot of land just beyond the northern edge perimeter fencing of the new Changi Air Base. It is the home of the Singapore Airshow, which has been held at the venue since 2008. Changi Exhibition Centre is owned and managed by Experia Events Pte Ltd.

== History ==
In 2006, The Straits Times reported that the Government of Singapore intended to expand Changi Airport's air cargo park onto the land used by the Changi International Exhibition and Convention Centre since 1998. A new 24-hectare permanent exhibition site was then allocated to build a new exhibition centre at a new 30,000-sq-m site on reclaimed land at Changi East on the fringe of Changi Airport.

In September 2006, Eng Lim Construction was awarded a S$60 million contract to build the new site for the Singapore Airshow. The contract includes building the main 40,000-square metre hall.

In response to the COVID-19 pandemic, the Changi Exhibition Centre was repurposed into a community isolation facility to house those who patients who were displaying mild symptoms of the COVID-19 disease, accepting its first patients on 25 April. It was set up by a task force comprising nine MINDEF-affiliated organisations along with partners such as the Dormitory Association of Singapore, Experia Events and Surbana Jurong. The remodeled facility can accommodate about 2,700 patients, and is currently undergoing an expansion of its outdoor area to accommodate an additional 1,700 patients. Its operations are managed by Mandarin Oriental Singapore and Raffles Medical Group.

== Specifications ==
The CEC is built on a 30-hectare site off Aviation Park Road, on reclaimed land to cater for future expansion of Singapore Changi Airport. Aviation Park Road, a new service road built to serve the site, branches off from Changi Coast Road and was specially built to double-up as a taxiway linking the site with the runway at Changi Air Base (East). This provision allows exhibition aircraft to arrive and depart without disrupting operations in Changi Airport.

The outdoor exhibition space includes a front plaza measuring 298 by 94 metres in size, and an outdoor display area 355 by 259 metres in size, both of which are located adjacent to the exhibition hall. Outdoor exhibition chalets are located along the waterfront beside the outdoor display area. In all, 100,000 m^{2} of outdoor exhibition space is available, equivalent to 33 soccer fields and can house ten Boeing 747s at a time.

A total of 2,000 open-air car parking spaces are available on site.

== Notable events ==
=== Airshows ===
The center was built to host airshow Asian Aerospace and first held the event in 1988. The event was held biennially since 1988.

It is the home of the biennial Singapore Airshow, which it has since been held for ten editions since 2008.

Experia Events Pte Ltd launched Rotorcraft Asia and Unmanned Systems Asia in 2017, which were also held together at the CEC.

=== Car shows ===
In between these events, the show site becomes a venue for car-related events. Several brands including BMW, Audi, Mercedes-Benz, Lexus, Mitsubishi, Ariel and Porsche have held events there, most in the form of private driving experiences. It also played host to the Formula Drift competition in 2008 and the Shell Eco-marathon in 2017 and 2018.

=== Defence Exhibition ===
In 2011, the biennial International Maritime Defence Exhibition and Conference (IMDEX) Asia, which was previously held at the Changi Naval Base, moved to the center and continued to be held at the centre since then.

=== Television ===
Changi Exhibition Centre was also used for the filming of Third Rail, a drama show that was aired on Mediacorp Channel 5.
