= List of heliports in Singapore =

This is a list of heliports and helipads in Singapore:

== Heliport ==
- Sembawang Air Base

== Helipads ==
- Brani Naval Base
- mTower
- Ministry of Defence Headquarters (three)
- Tan Tock Seng Hospital
- Singapore General Hospital
- Swissôtel The Stamford

== See also ==
- List of airports in Singapore
- Changi Airport
- History of Changi Airport
