= List of airports in Singapore =

This is a list of airports in Singapore, grouped by type and sorted by location. As of 2023, the country had a total of nine airports. Two of them are civilian airports in use (active), and seven are used for military purpose - non-civilian (not active).

Singapore, officially the Republic of Singapore, is an island country off the southern tip of the Malay Peninsula, 137 kilometres (85 mi) north of the equator. Singapore is also a city-state.

== Airports ==
Airports in Singapore

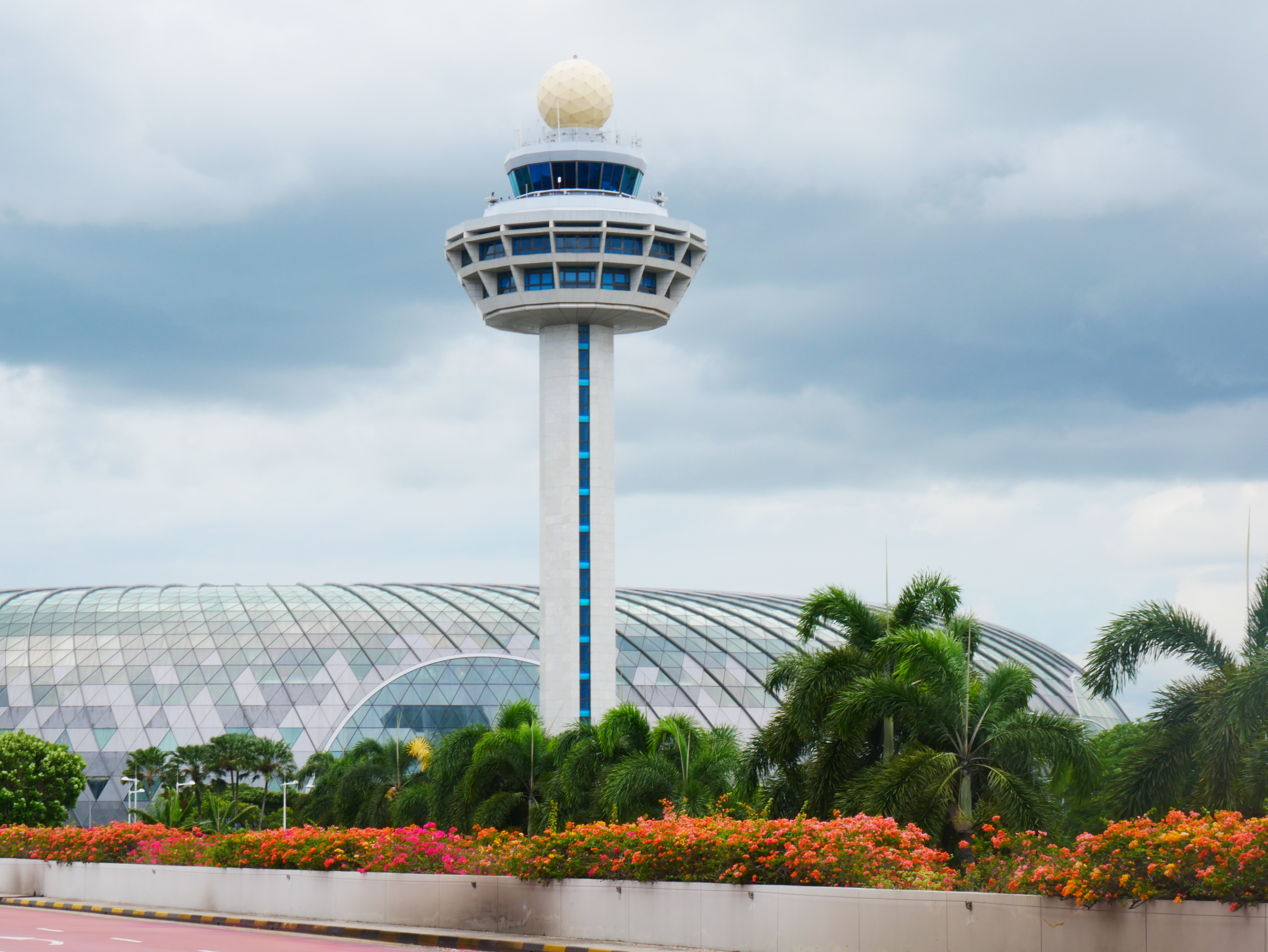
Changi Airport

Airport names shown in bold have scheduled passenger service on commercial airlines now.

Location served	ICAO	IATA	Airport name	Runway	Coordinates
Public airports (commercial)
Changi	WSSS	SIN	**Singapore Changi Airport** / Changi Air Base	4,000 m	01°21′33″N 103°59′22″E
Public airports (general aviation/reliever)
Seletar	WSSL	XSP	**Seletar Airport**	1,836 m	01°25′01″N 103°52′04″E
Military air bases
Changi	WSAC		Changi Air Base (West)	4,000 m	01°22′34″N 103°58′59″E
Changi			Changi Air Base (East)	4,000 m	01°20′44″N 104°00′35″E
Paya Lebar	WSAP	QPG	Paya Lebar Air Base (former Singapore Int'l Airport)	3,780 m	01°21′37″N 103°54′34″E
Sembawang	WSAG		Sembawang Air Base (helicopter base)	1,907 m	01°25′31″N 103°48′46″E
Tengah	WSAT	TGA	Tengah Air Base	2,743 m	01°23′14″N 103°42′31″E
Military airstrips
Pulau Sudong			Pulau Sudong Airport (island airport)	2,438 m	01°12′19″N 103°43′08″E
Former airports
Kallang			Kallang Airport (closed 1955)	1,677 m (became Old Airport Road)	01°18′26″N 103°52′24″E

== See also ==
- List of heliports in Singapore
- List of airports by ICAO code: W#WS - Singapore
- Transport in Singapore
