= WSAC =

WSAC may refer to:

- WSAC, the ICAO code for Changi Air Base (East), Singapore
- Washington Student Achievement Council, a Washington State Government agency overseeing higher education in the state of Washington
