= ST Aero MAV-1 =

Type of aircraft

MAV-1

General information
- Type: Unmanned aerial vehicle (UAV)
- Manufacturer: ST Aerospace and Defence Science and Technology Agency (DSTA)
- Status: Experimental
- Primary user: Singapore (research programme)
- Number built: 1 (prototype)

History
- Introduction date: Prototype only
- First flight: 2005
- Developed from: Swarming UAV research programme

The MAV-1 (Maneuvering Air Vehicle) is a low observable Unmanned Air Vehicle prototype developed by ST Aerospace and the Defence Science and Technology Agency for its swarming unmanned air vehicle research programme. The prototype was unveiled in Asian Aerospace 2004 and the first test flight was reported in 2005.
