= Singapore Airshow =

Biennial aerospace event held in Singapore

- Status: Active
- Genre: Air show
- Dates: February
- Frequency: Biennial: Even years
- Venue: Changi Exhibition Centre
- Location: Changi, Singapore
- Coordinates: 1°21′50.49″N 104°01′19.75″E
- Country: Singapore
- Established: 2008; 18 years ago
- Most recent: 2026
- Next event: 2028
- Attendance: 50,000 (2020)
- Major events: Trade exhibition Aerobatic displays Static displays
- Organiser: Experia Events Pte Ltd
- Website: Singapore Airshow

The Singapore Airshow is a biennial aerospace event held in Singapore, which debuted in 2008. It hosts high-level government and military delegations, as well as senior corporate executives around the world, while serving as a global event for leading aerospace companies and budding players (including start-ups) to make their mark in the international aerospace and defence market.

== Status ==
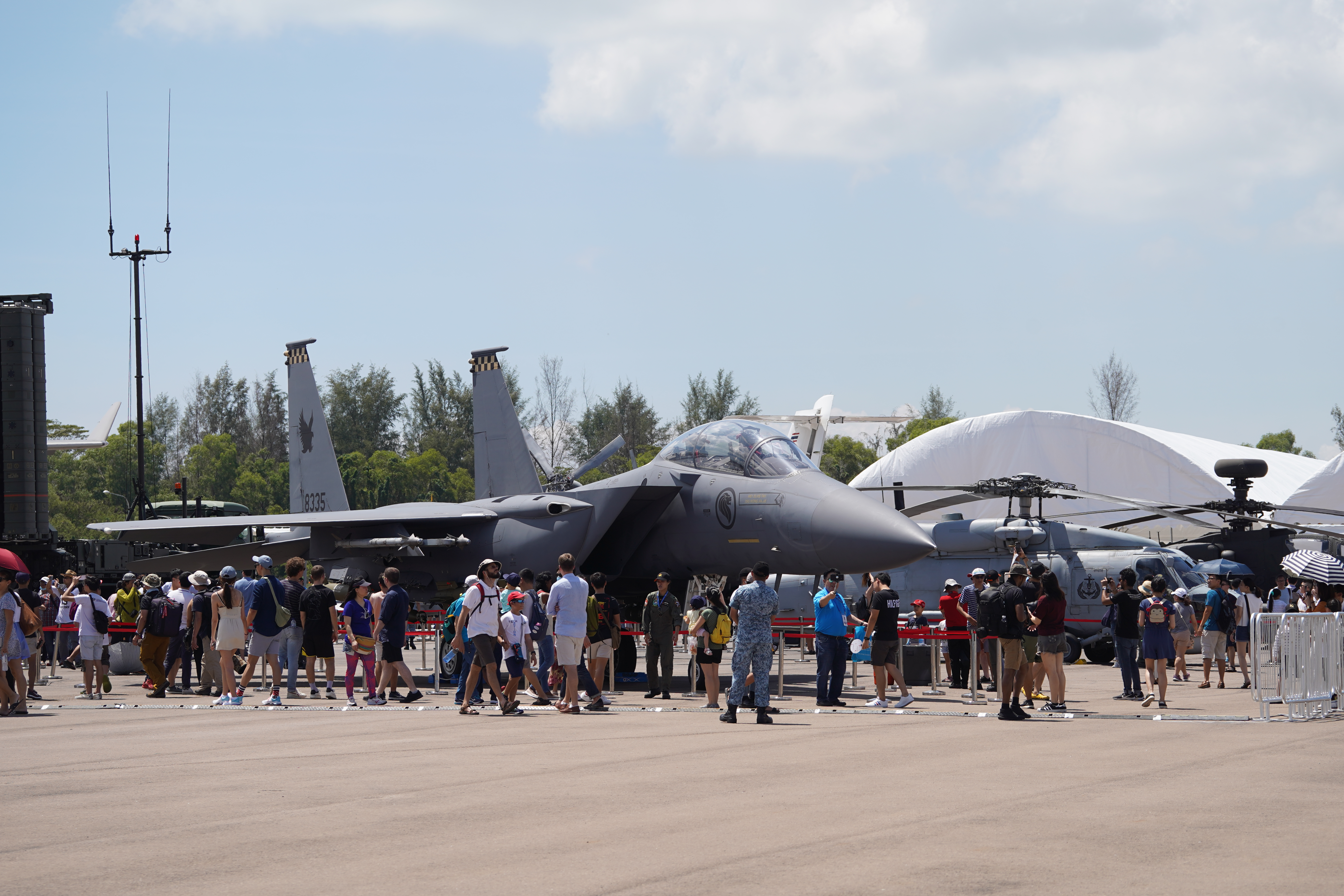
The Republic of Singapore Air Force F-15 SG in Singapore Air Show, 2020

Formerly known as Changi International Airshow, the Singapore Airshow was launched as a partnership between Singaporean agencies Civil Aviation Authority of Singapore and the Defence Science and Technology Agency after the relocation of Asian Aerospace from Singapore. The event offers conferences, forums and co-located events.

It is cited to be the third largest air show in the world after Le Bourget and Farnborough, as well as Asia's largest air show, although this is disputed by the Dubai Airshow.

== Venue ==
The selected venue for the permanent site of the Singapore Airshow is situated on a plot of land just beyond the northern edge perimeter fencing of Changi Air Base, which was itself located due east of the nearby Singapore Changi Airport. In 2006, a contract worth S$60 million was awarded to Eng Lim Construction to begin the building of the new exhibition site to replace the Changi International Exhibition and Convention Centre, including a main exhibition hall with 40,000 square metres of space.

When completed in September 2007, the New Changi Exhibition Centre had a 40,000 square metres of exhibition hall, 2,000 parking lots for trade visitors and motorists as well as 100,000 square metres of outdoor space for exhibitions and functions. Upon its completion, the hall was promptly named as the Changi Exhibition Centre to set it apart from the Changi International Exhibition and Convention Centre which had been in use by the Asian Aerospace exhibitions from 1988 to 2006. The old site is a good 2 kilometres due west of the current one.

== 2008 ==
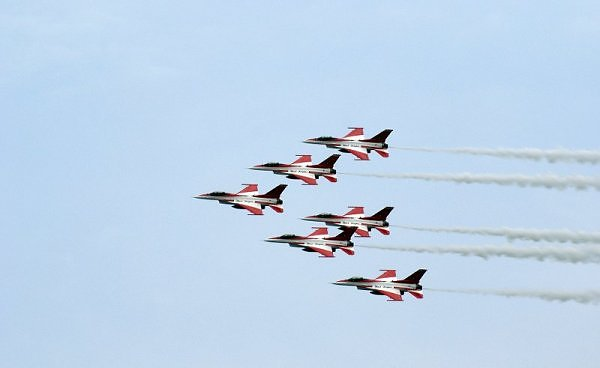
F-16Cs of RSAF Black Knights in formation flight during the inaugural show

The inaugural show was held from 19 to 24 February 2008, with the first four days reserved for trade visitors at the purpose-built Changi Exhibition Centre in Changi. Besides the usual exhibits and static displays, the event saw the return of aerobatic flying displays put up by the Airbus A380, Black Knights of the Republic of Singapore Air Force and the Roulettes of the Royal Australian Air Force. Also held concurrently are several seminars and conferences, including the Singapore Airshow Aviation Leadership Summit, the Global Air Power Conference, the International Defence Procurement Conference, the C4I Asia Conference and the Global Space and Technology Convention. The static displays included several themed exhibition pavilions, including the Airport Pavilion and the Integrated Land Defence Pavilion. The ATW Airline Industry Achievement Awards was also held during the Airshow. A minor incident occurred when Airshow organizers required Taiwanese aerospace company Aerospace Industrial Development Corporation to erase Taiwanese symbols displayed on their stand at the request of Chinese government officials.

=== Aircraft orders ===
- Garuda Indonesia: Conversion of an earlier order for six Boeing 777-200 to ten Boeing 777-300ER, worth US$2 billion
- Korean Air: Three Airbus A380-800 worth US$906 million
- Lion Air: 56 Boeing 737-900ERs with purchase rights for a further 50 aircraft worth US$4.4 billion
- BJets: launch of new Singapore-based airline, and a US$500 million deal to purchase twenty Cessna Citation CJ2+ business jets

=== Other announcements ===
- Air Caraibes: Selection of Pratt & Whitney PW4000-100 engines for its three Airbus A330-300 aircraft worth over US$180 million
- Grupo Marsans: Selection of Pratt & Whitney PW4000-100 engines for its five Airbus A330 aircraft worth over US$285 million
- Jetstar Asia: Selection of Global Service Partners to maintain V2500-A5 engines
- JAT Tehnika: Selection of Pratt & Whitney to maintain CFM56-3 engines
- Etihad Airways: Addition of four new Indian destinations, namely Chennai, Jaipur, Kolkata and Kozhikode
- Tiger Airways: Selected International Aero Engines to supply V2500 engines for 20 Airbus A320 planes, worth US$580 million

== 2010 ==
Singapore Airshow 2010, held at the Changi Exhibition Centre from 2 to 7 February 2010, featured more than 800 exhibiting companies from over 40 countries. More than 60 of the top 100 global aerospace companies participated, including Boeing, EADS, Honeywell, Lockheed Martin, Northrop Grumman and Rolls-Royce. Mitsubishi Aircraft, Liebherr-Aerospace, B/E Aerospace and a number of Asian aerospace firms made their first appearances at the show. The show hosted 20 country pavilions, with Switzerland, New Zealand, Russia and Romania making their inaugural presence.

== 2012 ==
With its theme, 'Big Show, Big Opportunities', Singapore Airshow 2012 was held from 14 to 19 February 2012 and hosted nearly 900 exhibitors from 50 countries, such as Boeing, Airbus, Embraer, and Bombardier. Fully half of the exhibitors represented the defence industry, but representation by the business aviation section grew significantly, including private jet manufacturers Gulfstream, Bombardier and Embraer, in response to rising demand from Asia's growing class of super-rich. The 2012 event also hosted the Aviation Leadership Summit.

== 2014 ==
The fourth edition of the Airshow was held from 11 to 16 February 2014.

- 20 deals worth S$40.5 billion (Disclosed) + 24 deals (undisclosed value) sealed at 2014 Singapore Airshow

== 2016 ==
Singapore Airshow 2016 was held from 16 to 21 February 2016

- 11 deals worth S$17.9 billion (Disclosed) + 41 deals (undisclosed value) sealed at 2016 Singapore Airshow

== 2018 ==
Singapore Airshow 2018 was held from 6 to 11 February 2018.

On 6 February, a KAI T-50 Golden Eagle, which was part of the Black Eagles aerobatic team taking part in the airshow, veered off the runway during takeoff. It subsequently crashed and caught fire. The fire was put out by emergency services and the pilot was treated for minor injuries. Following an investigation, the crash was determined to be due to pilot error.

== 2020 ==
The Singapore Airshow 2020 was held from 11 to 16 February 2020. Because of COVID-19 pandemic, many exhibitors pulled out and public were restricted from entering. The USAF F-22 Raptor Demo Team performed at the airshow for the first time.

== 2022 ==
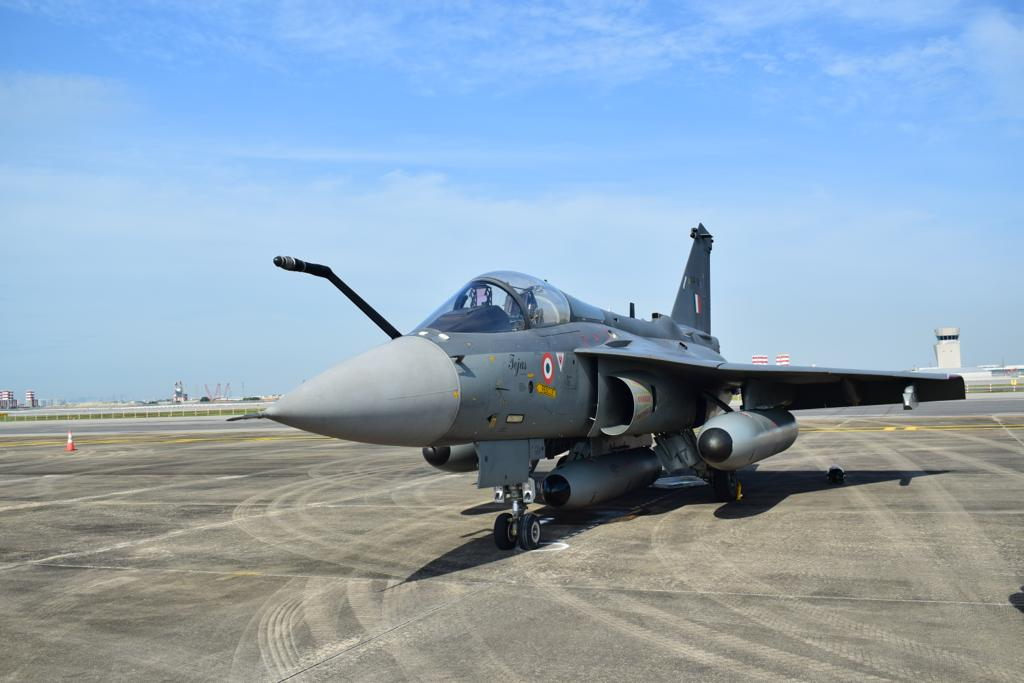
HAL Tejas at Changi International Airport for Singapore Air Show 2022

The Singapore Airshow 2022 was held from 15 to 18 February 2022 with no public days. As more ASEAN nations showed interest in HAL Tejas, India is participating with three Tejas multirole fighter aircraft and will conduct flying display. Indian delegation consisting of 44 members will showcase Tejas and interact with counterparts from Republic of Singapore Air Force and others from across the world.

== 2024 ==
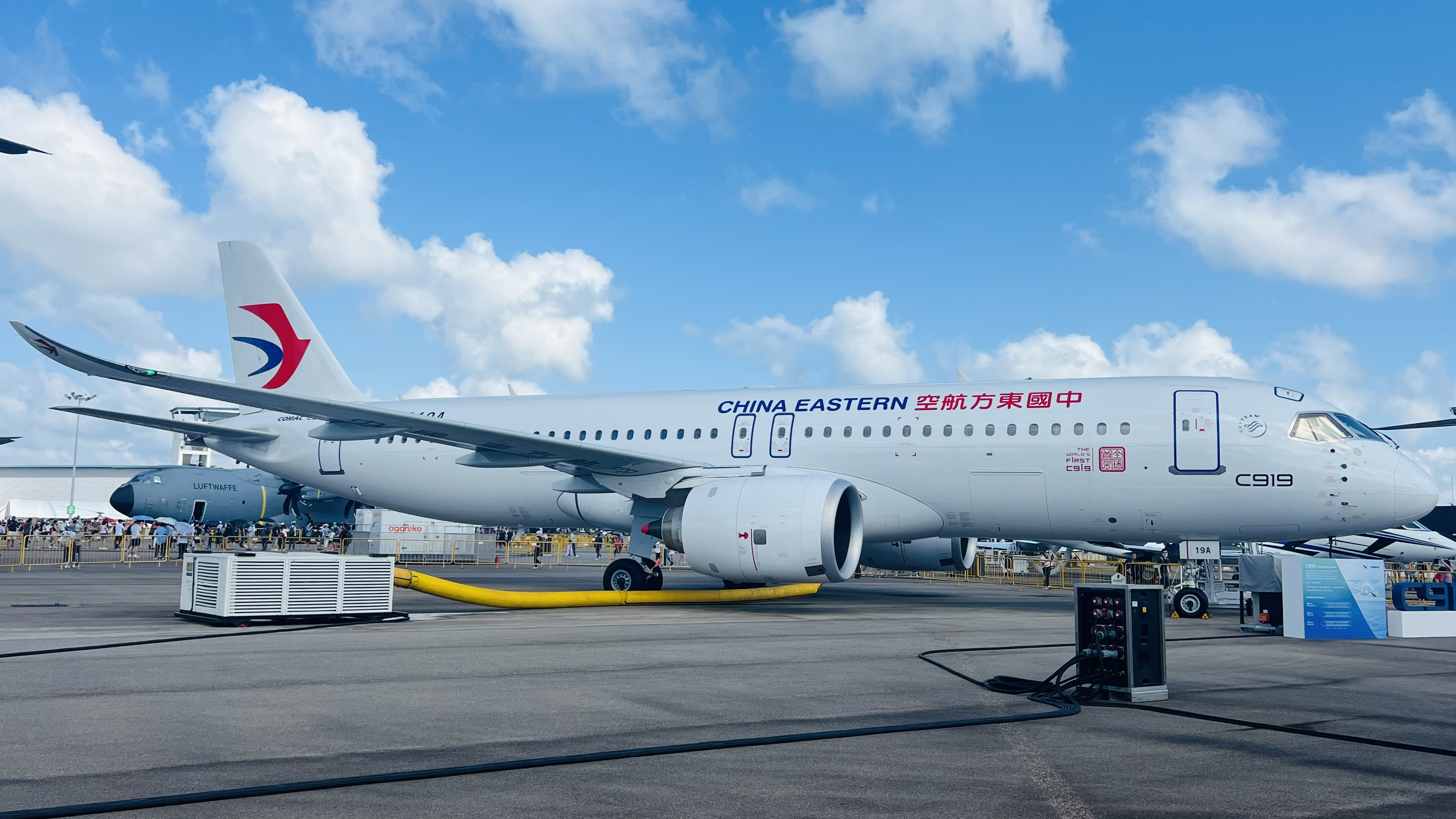
The Comac C919 made its debut on foreign soil at the 2024 Singapore Airshow.

The Singapore Airshow 2024 was held from 20 to 25 February 2024. Planes showcased included Comac aircraft C919 and ARJ21, a Republic of Singapore Air Force Boeing AH-64 Apache, a CATIC Z-10, among others.

Highlights included orders for Airbus from Vietjet (20 A330neos) and Starlux Airlines (three A330neos and five A350Fs), Boeing from Thai Airways (45 787-9s) and Royal Brunei Airlines (four 787-9s), and Comac from Tibet Airlines (40 C919s and 10 ARJ21s).

The airshow received calls for protests in the wake of the Gaza war. In response, the Singapore Police Force warned that such protests or public assemblies would be illegal.

A group of Chinese tourists were prohibited from entering into a German Air Force Airbus A400M military transport due to military restrictions. In response, Airbus posted a statement in the Chinese social media platform Weibo apologising for what happened and stated that they "improved the visit process, and ensured that the aircraft was open to all visitors."

The contents of a virtual WebEx meeting of senior German air force officials was leaked by Russian sources, because one officer dialled in from the airshow via an unsecure line.

== 2026 ==
The Singapore Airshow 2026 was held from 3 to 8 February 2026.

Planes on static display included Comac aircraft C919 and ARJ21, a Republic of Singapore Air Force Boeing F-15SG, Lockheed Martin F-16D, Boeing AH-64 Apache and Boeing CH-47 Chinook, Airbus A350-1000, Embraer C-390 Millennium and others.

Notable Flying Displays included a joint performance of a Republic of Singapore Air Force Lockheed Martin F-16C with a Boeing AH-64 Apache, and the return of the Bayi Aerobatic Team after 6 years.
