= Asian Aerospace =

International trade fair for aerospace business

- Genre: Trade fair
- Frequency: Biennial
- Location: Hong Kong

Asian Aerospace (AA) is an international trade fair for the aerospace business. Currently based in Hong Kong, it was held in Singapore since 1981 until disagreements between co-organisers Reed Exhibitions and Singapore Technologies in 2006 forced its relocation from 2007.

== History ==
Asian Aerospace was held at the old Paya Lebar Airport in Singapore when it was first hosted in 1981. Organised by ITF, a British organiser, it grew to become the third largest airshow in the world, and was touted by its organisers as the "world's second most influential airshow". ITF was subsequently acquired by Reed Exhibitions in 1982. Held once every two years, it boasted 759 exhibiting companies from 37 countries, a total of 26,814 trade visitors from 81 countries recorded, and trade deals amounting to US$3.52 billion were concluded in the 2004 event.

From 1988 onwards, the Asian Aerospace was held at the Changi International Exhibition and Convention Centre, a purpose built convention center for the trade fair.

In 1997, it was announced the trade fair will be moved to a new location within Changi, Singapore.

The largest edition of the show was held from 21 February to 26 February 2006, the 13th and final show in Singapore. This edition of the show was organised by Reed and Singapore Technologies Engineering as a 50:50 joint venture. Held jointly with several conferences including the Asia Pacific Security Conference (APSEC), the C4I Asia Conference (C4i Asia), the Asia Pacific Airline Training Symposium (APATS), the Asian Aerospace UAV Asia-Pacific Conference and the IATA/Asian Aerospace Aviation Summit, it featured a rebranded Asian Defense Technology military component. At show's end, it drew 940 exhibitors from 43 countries, 34,300 trade participants from 89 countries and concluded a record US15.2 billion in sales.

=== Relocation ===
On 13 February 2006, Reed Exhibitions announced that it would hold its final Asian Aerospace airshow in Singapore, after which the exhibition would be relocated to AsiaWorld–Expo at Hong Kong International Airport island, Lantau Island, Hong Kong as the new site, with the first relocated show to be held in 2007. The show moved out of Singapore as Reed Exhibitions could not agree with the Government of Singapore over development plans for a new 24-hectare permanent exhibition site in Changi. The Straits Times reported that the Singapore government intended to expand Changi Airport's air cargo park onto the land used by the Changi International Exhibition and Convention Centre since 1998. The Singapore government would build a new exhibition centre at a new 30,000-sq-m site on reclaimed land at Changi East on the fringe of Changi Airport and required Reed Exhibitions to commit to keep the airshow in Singapore which Reed Exhibitions would not commit. As a result, the Singapore government announced Singapore would hold a new airshow, Singapore Airshow, on its own at the new site. The Straits Times also reported that Reed Exhibitions attempted to persuade Singapore not to host the airshow independently.

On 3 September 2007, the 4-day Asian Aerospace International Expo and Congress began in Hong Kong with 500 companies from 20 countries participating. The Airbus A380 was allowed to do a special flypast twice over the Victoria Harbour as part of the show. The Aircraft Interiors EXPO ASIA was held concurrently with the airshow, but the scaled-down show was without its military-related businesses due to political sensitivities in relation to China. Immediately prior to the event's commencement, Reeds announced over 500 exhibitors from over 20 countries and around 10,000 pre-registered trade visitors.
