= Changi International Exhibition and Convention Centre =

Convention center in Singapore

Coordinates: 1°23′14.19″N 103°59′51.68″E

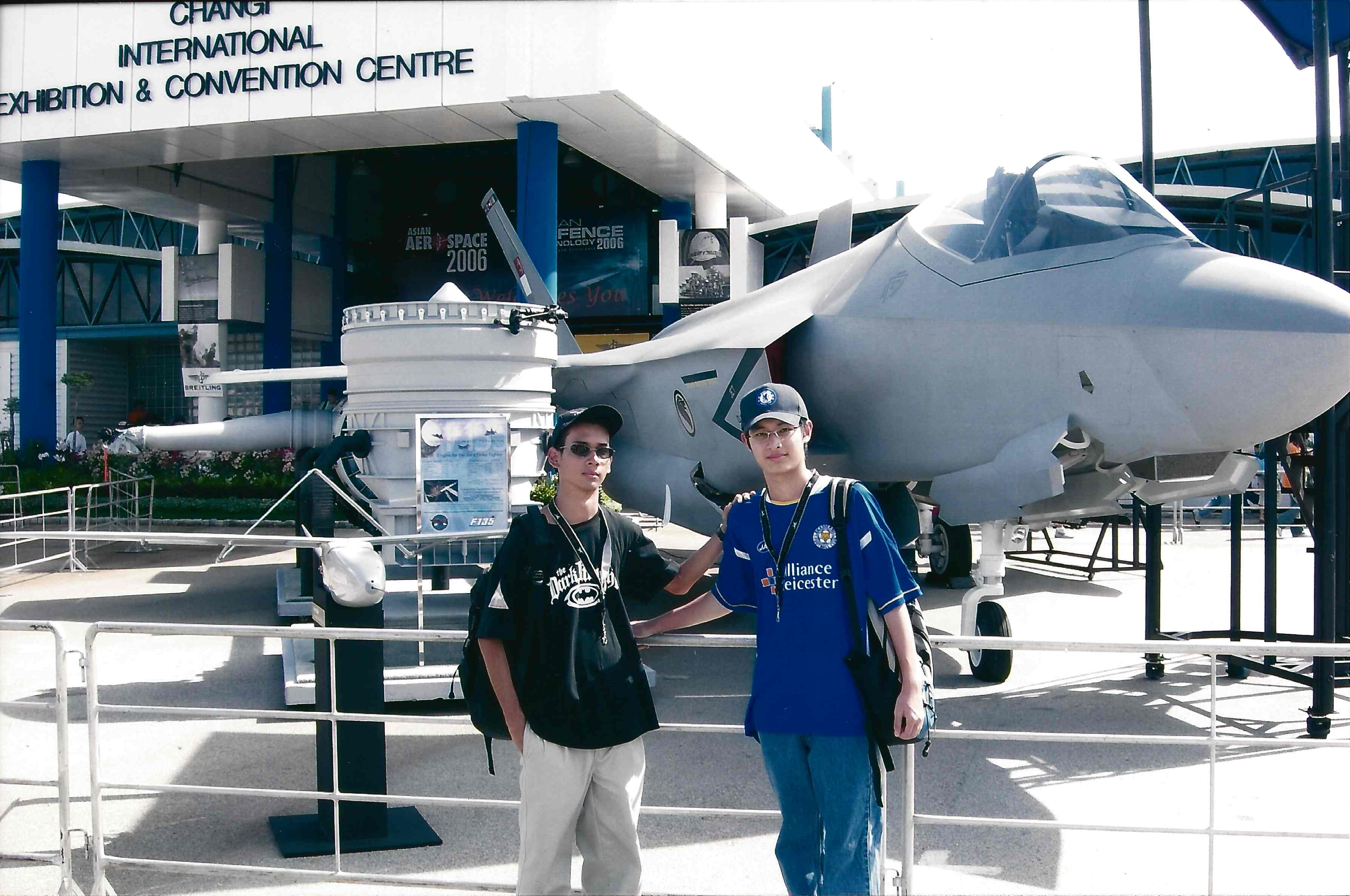
Changi International Exhibition and Convention Centre

The Changi International Exhibition and Convention Centre (CIECC), also commonly referred as the Changi Exhibition Centre, was a convention center in Singapore located just beyond the northern edge perimeter fencing of Singapore Changi Airport, and had served as the venue for the Asian Aerospace since its completion in 1988 until 2006 when it was managed by Reed Exhibitions. It currently offers over 23,000 square metres (250,000 sq ft) of space, as well as 14,000 square metres (150,000 sq ft) of outdoor space for exhibitions and functions.

CIECC was torn down in late 2006.

== History ==
In January 1998, Sembawang Construction and Sato Kogyo were awarded a $12-million contract to construct the CIECC. The CIECC finished construction in ten months and was completed in December. Conference facilities, offices and a dining room were also built to accommodate the hosting of the Asian Aerospace Exhibition.

On 13 February 2006, Reed Exhibitions announced that it would hold its final Asian Aerospace airshow at the CIECC in Singapore. The airshow moved out of Singapore as Reed Exhibitions could not commit to keep the airshow in Singapore after the Government of Singapore intend to move the airshow to a new 24-hectare permanent exhibition site in Changi. The Straits Times reported that the Singapore government intended to expand Changi Airport's air cargo park onto the land used by the CIECC since 1998.

CIECC was torn down in late 2006.
