= History of Changi Airport =

History of the Singaporean aerodrome

Singapore Changi Airport (IATA: SIN, ICAO: WSSS), or simply Changi Airport, is the primary civilian airport in the Republic of Singapore, and one of the largest transportation hubs in Southeast Asia. It is located approximately 17.2 km (10.7 mi) northeast from the commercial centre in Changi, on a 13 square kilometres (5.0 sq mi) site.

== Background ==
Singapore's International Airport at Paya Lebar, Singapore's third main civilian airport after Seletar Airport (main airport from 1930 to 1937) and Kallang Airport (1937–55) opened in 1955 with a single runway and a small passenger terminal. With the growth in global aviation transport, the airport was facing congestion problems. Its inability to cope with the rising traffic became critical by the 1970s; annual passenger numbers rose dramatically from 300,000 in 1955 to 1.7 million in 1970 and to 4 million in 1975.

The government had two options: expand the existing airport at Paya Lebar or build a new airport at another location. After extensive study, a decision was made in 1972 to keep the airport at Paya Lebar, as recommended by a British aviation consultant. Plans were made for the building of a second runway and an extensive redevelopment and expansion to the passenger terminal building. A year later, however, the plans were reviewed again as the pressure to expand the airport eased because of the 1973 oil crisis.

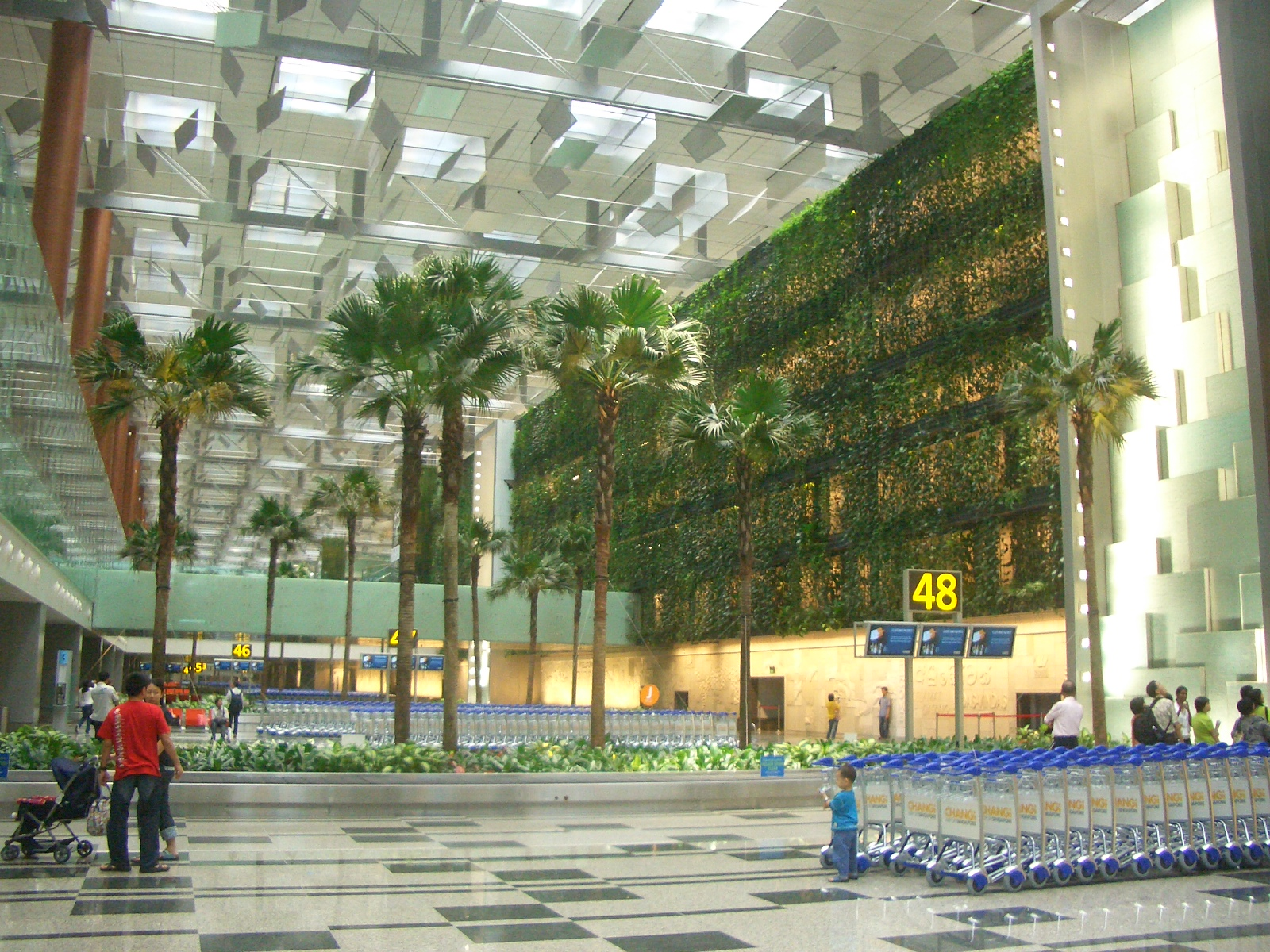
Baggage collection point; the Green Wall (right) spans 300 m (980 ft) and comprises 25 species of climbing plants.

Concerned that the existing airport was located in an area with potential for urban growth, which would physically hem it in on all sides, the government subsequently decided in 1975 to build a new airport at the eastern tip of the main island at Changi, at the existing site of Changi Air Base, where the new airport would be easily expandable through land reclamation. However, as there was an increase in traffic, the airport still had to be expanded at that time. In addition, aeroplanes could fly over the sea, avoiding noise pollution issues within residential areas like those at Paya Lebar and helping to avoid disastrous consequences on the ground in the event of an air mishap. The airport in Paya Lebar was subsequently converted for military use as Paya Lebar Air Base.

== Construction ==
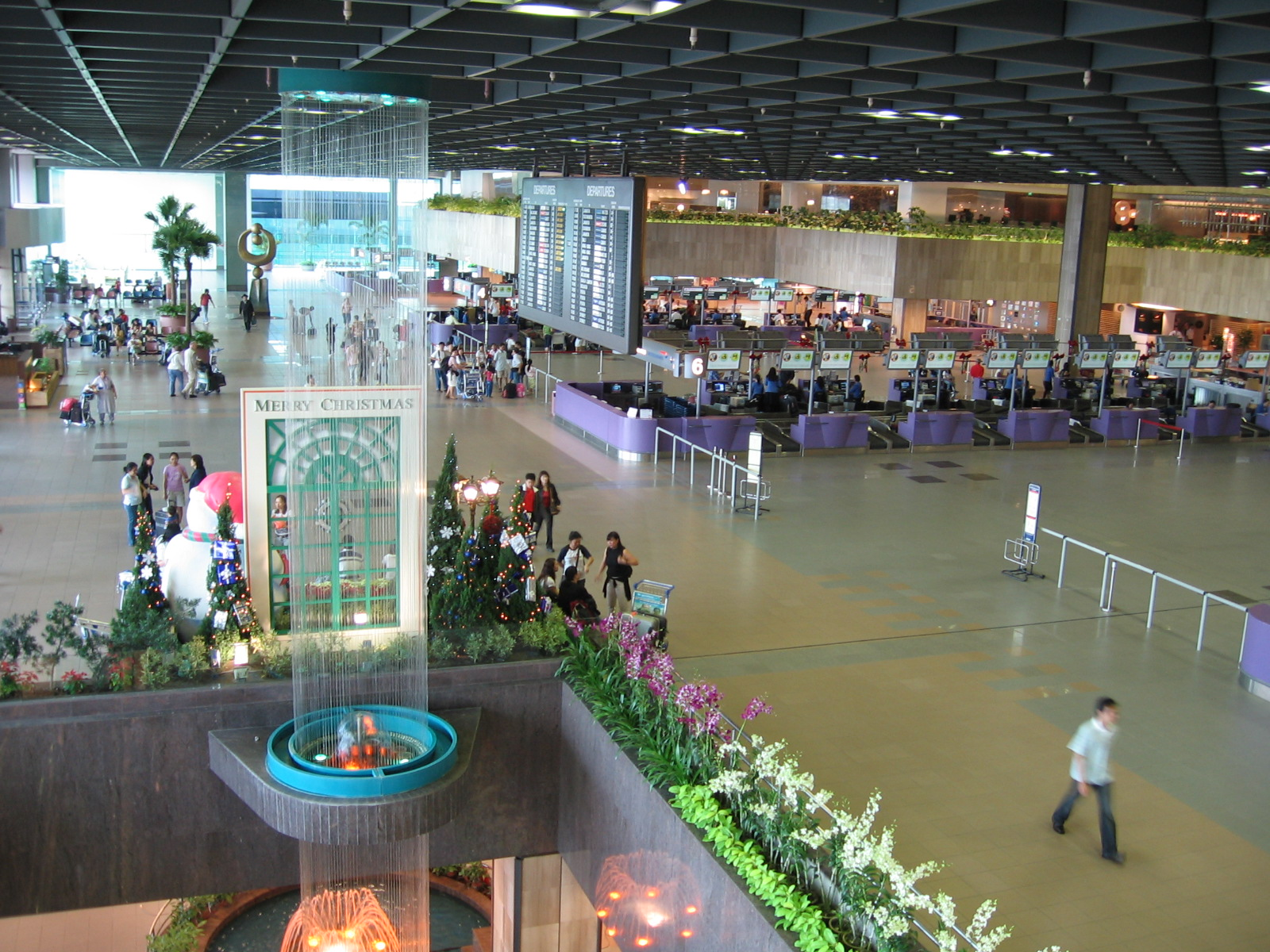
Former Departure hall of Terminal 1

The original master plan for Changi Airport, designed by Netherlands Airport Consultants (NACO) in 1976, involved constructing a dual-terminal and dual-runway configuration over two phases with provisions for another two passenger terminals in the future. Phase 1 included the construction for the first passenger terminal, the first runway (basically reusing and upgrading the main runway of Changi Air Base), 45 aircraft parking bays, support facilities and structures, including a large maintenance hangar, the first fire station, workshops and administrative offices, an airfreight complex, two cargo agents buildings, in-flight catering kitchens and an 80 m (260 ft) control tower. Construction for the second phase would commence immediately after the completion of Phase 1 and include the second runway, 23 new aircraft parking bays in addition to the existing 45 bays, a second fire station and a third cargo agent building.

Land reclamation works involving the use of over 52,000,000 m^{3} (68,000,000 yd^{3}) of landfill and seafill began in Changi in June 1975, even as the airport at Paya Lebar was still in the midst of expansion works. About 2 km^{2} (490 acres) of swamp land was cleared and filled with 12,000,000 m^{3} (16,000,000 yd^{3}) of earth from the nearby hills, while another 40,000,000 m^{3} (52,000,000 yd^{3}) of sand were used to fill up the seabed. Canals were built to drain water from three existing rivers, namely Sungei Tanah Merah Besar, Sungei Ayer Gemuroh and Sungei Mata Ikan. In total, 870 hectares (2,100 acres) were reclaimed, raising the total site area to 1,300 hectares. Of this, landfill accounted for 200 hectares (490 acres) while seafill represented 670 hectares (1,700 acres).

The first phase costing about S$1.3 billion commenced commercial operation on 1 July 1981 with the first flight, Singapore Airlines SQ101 touching down at 0700 hours (Coordinated Universal Time) with 140 passengers from Kuala Lumpur. Officially opened with much fanfare five months later on 29 December 1981, the airport ended its first year operations with 12.1 million passengers, close to 200,000 tonnes of air freight handled and 63,100 aircraft movements. 1981 was the year that DFS started its duty free concession, something it held until it gave it up in June 2020. It would become the biggest and oldest tenant at Changi airport. Sections of phase 2 opened progressively in the next few years, with Terminal 2 opening for passenger traffic nine years later on in 1990 way ahead of traffic demand.

=== Expansion ===
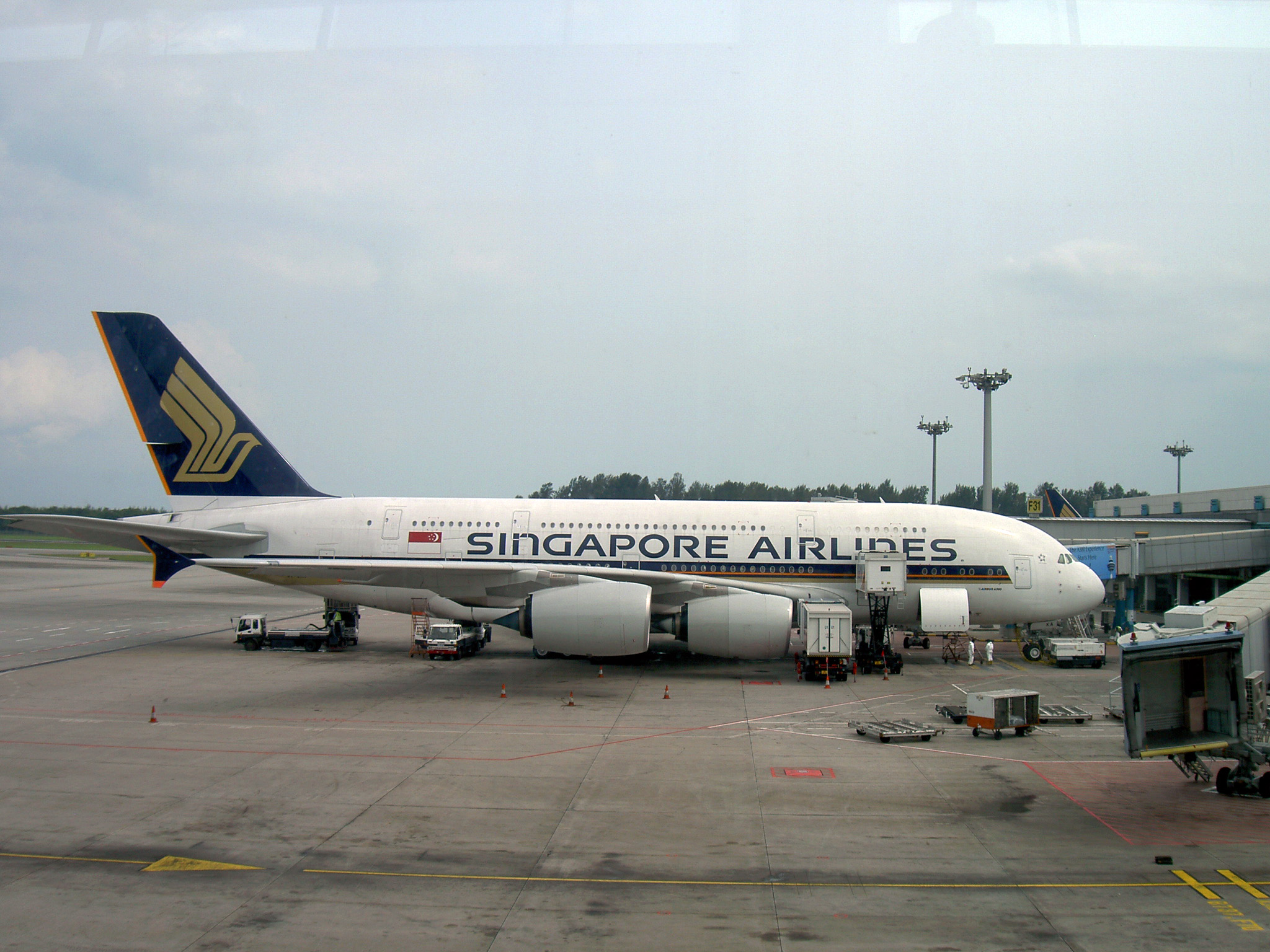
The first commercially used A380, Singapore Airlines 9V-SKA, parked at Terminal 2

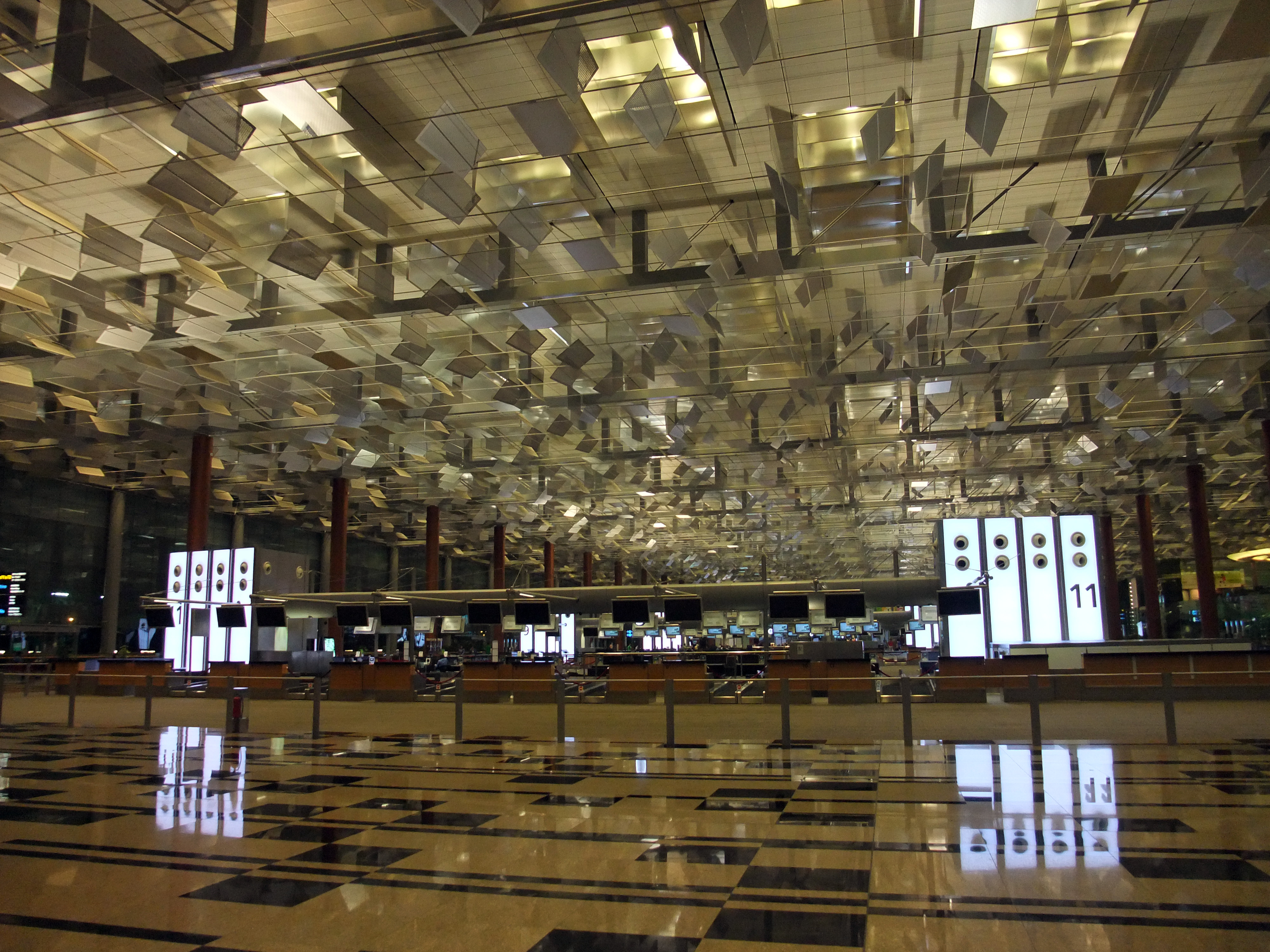
Check-in counters at Terminal 3; the round holes are the air-conditioning vents—they are placed at a lower level to diffuse cool air more efficiently

The Singapore Changi Airport has a development policy of always building years ahead of demand to help to avoid congestion problems common in major airports and maintain high service standards. While the original master plan details plans for two passenger terminals, there have been provisions to provide for long-term expansion initiatives, including the allocation of space for a third terminal planned to have a physical configuration mirroring that of Terminal 2. Plans for Terminal 3 were however subsequently reviewed, resulting in a new design concept which departs from the largely utilitarian architecture in the first two terminals. Topped by a unique roof feature designed by Skidmore, Owings and Merrill, the terminal was built with a full-service nine-story Crowne Plaza Hotel immediately adjacent to it.

Officials commenced construction in 1999 after receiving the green light in December 1996. Construction of Terminal 3 began in 1999, at an estimated cost of about S$1.75 billion. Originally planned for completion in 2006, the date was postponed by two years after the SARS outbreak in Singapore slowed growth of air traffic for the airport. Upon completion, the terminal increased the airport's total capacity by 22 million passengers to 66 million passengers per year. On 30 May 2006, a topping out ceremony for the terminal was conducted, and an open house was held from 12 November 2007 to 9 December 2007. Test flights were held from 12 November until 3 January where the baggage handling, check-in and ground handling systems were tested. The terminal became operational on 9 January 2008 with Singapore Airlines (SQ1) from San Francisco via Hong Kong being the first flight to arrive at the new terminal at 11:56 local time (03:56 UTC) and SQ318 at 13:15 local time (05:15 UTC) being the first departing flight.

Changing needs in the aviation industry led to reviews in the master plan, resulting in the decision to cater to the high-end as well as budget sectors of the air travel industry. Although the pioneering airport to conceptualise and construct a Budget Terminal in Asia, it became operational on 26 March 2006 and was officially opened on 31 October 2006. A dedicated stand-alone "Commercially Important Person" (CIP) terminal operated by JetQuay, started operations on 15 August 2006 and officially opened on 29 September 2006. It is the first luxury airport terminal in Asia.

To prepare for the arrival of the Airbus A380, the airport put into place modifications works costing S$60 million, which it has planned for since the late 1990s. These included the building of 19 gates capable of handling the large aircraft, eight of which are in Terminal 3. Baggage claim carousels, runways, and taxiways were expanded, and two new freighter aircraft stands and two remote aircraft parking stands built. Two aircraft taxiway bridges spanning Airport Boulevard leading to the terminals also had shields installed on either side to shield the road from the jet blast. On 11 November 2005, the airport became the first outside Europe to receive the A380 for airport compatibility verification tests and was the first in the world to have an operational triple-passenger loading bridge fit for trials.

Extensive upgrading works in Terminal 1 similar in scale to the recently completed works at Terminal 2 commenced on 1 January 2008 and were completed on 1 January 2012. A highlight of the revamped Departure Check-in Hall is the addition of the world's largest kinetic art sculpture. Known as Kinetic Rain, this sculpture is made up of a total of 1,216 bronze droplets, moving in synchrony to a specially choreographed dance every day.

Resurfacing works costing S$50m on its dual runways and older taxiways were announced in January 2007 along with improvements to the security systems of Changi Airport such as access controls and surveillance systems to make the airport safer for travellers. Transport Minister Raymond Lim also added that the "software" of the airport had to be improved as well. Terminal 3 was tested in 2007 to prepare for its 2008 opening. From May 2008 to July 2012 Terminal 1 was upgraded at a cost of S$500 million.

In 2006, a short runway 2,750 m (9,020 ft) was opened for Changi Air Base (East) on the site, an interim measure in preparation for its eventual expansion for passenger flights. It will be the first element in what may double the area of the existing airport in the next few decades.

On 1 March 2012, Changi Airport Group announced that the Budget Terminal will be closed in September 2012 to make way for Terminal 4, which will be able to serve 16 million passengers a year. The new terminal will be designed with the flexibility to meet the operational needs of both full-service and low-cost carriers and be able to handle both narrow and wide-body aircraft. Beyond efficient passenger processing and quick turnaround of aircraft, the new terminal will also have a wide choice of retail and food & beverage offerings as well as passenger amenities that will better serve the needs of passengers.

On 7 March 2012, Minister of State for Transport Josephine Teo announced in Parliament that a new multi-storey complex at the current Terminal 1 carpark will be built. The facility will house dedicated facilities to support fly-cruise and fly-coach travel options. When ready, Terminal 1's capacity will increase from 21 million to 24 million passengers per annum.

Recently Changi Airport has also announced plans to reduce consumption of electricity and use recycled water at its terminal buildings over the next three years, as part of its contribution towards environmental sustainability. Currently, Changi Airport's annual terminal building electricity consumption is about 450 million kWh. The target will see Changi Airport reducing its terminal buildings' electricity usage by about 13.5 million kWh, generating savings of about S$2.4 million over the next three years.

Minister of State for Transport Josephine Teo, who leads a 10-member Multi-agency committee that has been working on the blueprint which includes the construction of Terminal 5 (T5) – the airport's biggest passenger facility – a third runway for commercial flights, cargo complexes and other supporting infrastructure for around 18 months.

Announced on 19 August 2013 by Changi Airport Group, a new mixed-use complex will be developed on the car park site fronting Terminal 1 (T1) and will optimise the use of the 3.5-hectare plot of land. Construction of the new facility began in December 2014. Named Jewel Changi Airport, the complex will offer aviation and travel-related facilities, a wide range of retail offerings, as well as unique leisure attractions. The redevelopment will also expect Terminal 1 to be expanded to allow more space for the arrival hall, baggage claim areas and taxi bays, enabling T1's passenger handling capacity to increase to 24 million passenger movements per annum. Changi will be working with CapitaMalls Asia on the concept and plans of Jewel Changi Airport. The completion of the complex would expect a joint venture partnership between Changi and CapitaMalls Asia to develop and manage Project Jewel. Jewel Changi Airport is also being designed with a view of the complex from both the Airport Boulevard and the sky. It will be designed by a consortium of design consultants led by architect Moshe Safdie, who designed Marina Bay Sands. A feature of the complex will be a large-scale indoor garden with a waterfall. To be connected to Terminals 1, 2 and 3, Project Jewel will serve as a node linking the three terminals, improving inter-terminal connectivity.

Due to the construction of Jewel Changi Airport, the open-air car park fronting Terminal 1 (T1) will be closed for redevelopment from 12 November 2014. Following the car park closure, T1 users will be directed to park at the nearest car park located at Terminal 2 (T2) – which will be renamed T1 Car Park. Car Park 2B was renamed as T1 Car Park while Car Park 2A was renamed as T2 Car Park. At the same time, the existing Arrival pick-up point at T1 will also be shifted to another location outside the T1 Arrival Hall.

Growth in Traffic and Connectivity at Singapore Changi Airport
| Airlines | 1981 | 1990 | 2010 | 2015 | 2016 | 2017 |
|---|---|---|---|---|---|---|
| Passenger movements | 8.1 million | 15.6 million | 42 million | 55.4 million | 58.7 million | 62.2 million |
| Airfreight movements (tonnes) | 193,000 tonnes | 623,800 tonnes | 1.81 million tonnes | 1.85 million tonnes | 1.96 million tonnes | 2.13 million tonnes |
| Country Links | 43 | 53 | >60 | >80 | >80 | 90 |
| City Links | 67 | 111 | >200 | >320 | >380 | 400 |
| Scheduled Airlines | 34 | 52 | >100 | >100 | >100 | >100 |
| Weekly Scheduled Flights | ≈1,200 | ≈2,000 | >5,400 | >6,800 | >7,000 | 7,200 |

On 31 October 2017, Terminal 4 opened. It has 21 jetbridges and 8 bus gates. Cathay Pacific and AirAsia moved their operation to the new terminal.

On 17 April 2019, Jewel Changi Airport opened.

In August 2019, DFS announced that it would not be renewing the duty free concession it has held at Changi airport since 1981. It was the biggest and oldest tenant at Changi airport. Changing regulations around alcohol and tobacco was among the reasons DFS gave for giving up the concession, which expired in June 2020. In October 2019, Changi announced that South Korean travel retailer Lotte Duty Free would take over the concession, with a 6-year contract. The concession would include every one of the 18 liquor and tobacco stores in the 4 terminals equating some 8,000 sq m of retail space, and would be Lotte's biggest operation in the Asia Pacific region. Renovations would only take place once the "circuit breaker" restrictions related to COVID-19 were lifted.

== Response to COVID-19 ==
In response to the COVID-19 pandemic which had roiled the air travel industry, Changi Airport Group announced that it would consolidate services in order to optimise their resources and reduce the costs on airline customers. Terminal 2 was the first to be closed, on 7 April 2020. Operations of Terminal 4 were wound up from 21 April 2020 and shut down on 16 May 2020 due to lack of demand. There are plans to reopen Terminal 4 under Phase 3 of the Safe Travel. All terminals were reopened from 29 May 2022.

In addition, the remaining terminal accesses were restricted from May 2021 to 31 August 2021 due to an outbreak of the COVID-19 Delta variant at the airport. Jewel Changi Airport reopened on 14 June, followed by T1 and T3 reopening on 1 September 2021.

== Incidents and accidents ==
- 26 March 1991: Singapore Airlines Flight 117, an Airbus A310 that departed from Kuala Lumpur, was hijacked by four men en route to Singapore. The hijackers wanted the plane refuelled so that they could fly to Australia. When the plane landed in Singapore, commandos stormed the flight, killing the four Pakistani hijackers, and leaving all other passengers and crew unhurt.
- 4 November 2010: Qantas Flight 32, Airbus A380 "Nancy-Bird Walton", VH-OQA, suffered a serious failure of its left inboard engine (#2 engine). The flight landed safely, and all 440 passengers and 24 crew on board were unharmed. Cowling parts of the failed engine fell on Batam Island.

== Recognition ==
Since its opening in 1981, the airport has made its mark in the aviation industry as a benchmark for service excellence, winning over 500 awards up to 2015. This winning streak has continued unabated, including the Skytrax Best Airport of the year award in 2006, despite being substantially older than many of its regional rivals. Changi Airport's efforts to counter the onset of age includes periodic physical upgrades to its existing terminals, building of new facilities and raising the benchmark in service quality, a factor which cannot be bought or built overnight, and where it continues to excel over its rivals.

=== Accolades ===
| Year | Award | Category | Results | Ref |
|---|---|---|---|---|
| 2009 | Airport Service Quality Awards by Airports Council International | Best Airport Worldwide | 2nd | |
| 2009 | Airport Service Quality Awards by Airports Council International | Best Airport in Asia-Pacific | 2nd | |
| 2009 | Airport Service Quality Awards by Airports Council International | Best Airport by Size (25–40 million passenger) | 2nd | |
| 2010 | Airport Service Quality Awards by Airports Council International | Best Airport Worldwide | 2nd | |
| 2011 | Airport Service Quality Awards by Airports Council International | Best Airport Worldwide | 2nd | |
| 2012 | Airport Service Quality Awards by Airports Council International | Best Airport by Size (Over 40 million passenger) | 1st | |
| 2013 | Airport Service Quality Awards by Airports Council International | Best Airport by Size (Over 40 million passenger) | 1st | |
| 2014 | Airport Service Quality Awards by Airports Council International | Best Airport by Size (Over 40 million passenger) | 1st | |

=== World Airport Awards ===
| Place | Years |
|---|---|
| 1st | 2000, 2006, 2010, 2013–2020, 2023 |
| 2nd | 2002–2005, 2007–2008, 2011–2012, 2024 |
| 3rd | 2001, 2009, 2021-2022 |

- Best Airport Worldwide for 7 consecutive years 2013-2019
- Top 3 Airport Worldwide for 20 consecutive years 2000–2019
- Best Airport Leisure Amenities 2008–2017
- Best Airport in Asia 2010, 2013–2017
- Best Airport Duty-Free Shopping Award 2008
- Best Airport Dining Award 2008
- Best International Transit Airport 2011–2012
- Best Airport serving 50 million+ passengers 2013–2017

=== Airport Star ranking ===
- 5 Star Airport, the highest category in Skytrax's "World Airport Star Ranking".
