= Changi Air Base (East) =

Changi Air Base (East) Pangkalan Udara Changi (Timur) (Malay) 樟宜空軍基地（東） (Chinese) சாங்கி வான்படைத் தளம் கிழக்கு (Tamil)
- Changi Air Base (East) Crest Badge
- IATA: none; ICAO: WSAC

Summary
- Airport type: Military airbase
- Owner: Ministry of Defence (Singapore)
- Operator: Republic of Singapore Air Force; United States Air Force
- Location: 317 Tanah Merah Coast Road, Singapore 498820
- Coordinates: 01°20′44″N 104°0′35″E
- Interactive map of Changi Air Base (East)

Runways
Direction	Length		Surface
Direction	m	ft	Surface
02R/20L	4,000	13,123	Asphalt
03/21	3,660	12,007	Asphalt
- Runway 03/21 is still under construction

Changi Air Base (East), also known as the Changi East Complex, is an extension of the existing Changi Air Base, which has since been renamed Changi Air Base (West). Located about 2 kilometres east of Changi Airport and 1.5 kilometres west of Changi Naval Base, the facility was developed to support both military and aviation infrastructure needs. Groundbreaking took place on 15 July 2002, and the base was officially opened on 29 November 2004. A new runway designated 02R/20L was constructed as part of the development, initially measuring around 2,748 metres in length.

The 02R/20L runway has since been extended to 4,000 metres and is now physically connected to the rest of Changi Airport also for civilian use. This runway will serve both civilian and military operations when Terminal 5 becomes operational. In addition, a fourth runway designated 03/21 is currently under construction to the east of the airbase, adjacent to Tanah Merah Coast Road. Unlike the dual-use runway, this new runway is designated solely for military use.

== Location ==
The facility at Changi Air Base (East) is home to the Republic of Singapore Air Force's 145 Squadron, which operates the F-16D Block 52+ Fighting Falcons. These aircraft are known for their extended range and ground attack capabilities. The base also houses the 208 Squadron, 808 Squadron and 508 Squadron. Its proximity to the South China Sea offers operational advantages over Tengah Air Base and Paya Lebar Air Base, enabling aircraft to reach offshore training zones more quickly. The 145 Squadron can save up to five to ten minutes in transit time compared to other air bases, resulting in fuel savings, lower operating costs and faster response capabilities.

The runway at Changi East was progressively extended to 4,000 metres in the early 2020s to support growing air traffic linked to the ongoing development of Terminal 5. Upon full completion, the upgraded runway will support joint civilian and military operations. As part of the larger Changi Airport expansion plan and to facilitate the eventual relocation of Paya Lebar Air Base, the airfield at Changi East was temporarily closed for further development and was reopened at the end of 2018.

== Organisation ==
Air Combat Command (ACC) “Poised And Deadly”

- 112 Squadron, Republic of Singapore Air Force “Determined To Deliver”
  - 6 Airbus A330 MRTT

Air Power Generation Command (APGC) “Generate And Sustain”

- 208 Squadron “Reliable And Vigilant Always”
- 508 Squadron "Unrivalled Support"
- 608 Squadron "Vigour And Vigilance"
- 708 Squadron “Agile And Dependable”
- 808 Squadron “Ready And Vigilant”

== Singapore Airshow ==
Also, located just beyond the northern edge perimeter fencing of the air base is the permanent venue of the new Changi Exhibition Centre for the Singapore Airshow which was completed in September 2007 and had hosted the recently inaugurated Singapore Airshow 2008 in February 2008. The most recent Airshow was held from 3–8 February 2026.

== 40th Anniversary of Five Power Defence Arrangements ==
On 1 November 2011, Singapore hosted the Five Power Defence Arrangements (FPDA)'s 40th-anniversary celebrations, with the defence ministers, aircraft and servicemen from all five signatory countries converging on the air base to participate in the event. Amongst the participating aircraft spotted roosting at the dispersal area of the air base were Republic of Singapore Air Force's F-15SG Strike Eagle, Royal Air Force's Typhoon FGR4, Royal Australian Air Force's F/A-18A Hornets, Royal Malaysian Air Force's F/A-18D Hornets and Royal New Zealand Air Force's P-3K2 Orions. Later, a gala dinner was hosted by Singapore's defence minister, Ng Eng Hen, at Singapore's Istana whereupon they called on the Prime Minister of Singapore, Lee Hsien Loong, to discuss a multitude of issues. Codenamed Exercise Bersama Lima, the three days joint exercise is expected to test the readiness and cooperation between all participating countries and should conclude on 4 November 2011.

== See also ==
- Republic of Singapore Air Force
- Singapore Airshow
- Changi Naval Base
