= Changi Airport =

International airport in Singapore

Changi Airport Lapangan Terbang Changi (Malay) 樟宜机场 (Chinese) சாங்கி விமான நிலையம் (Tamil)

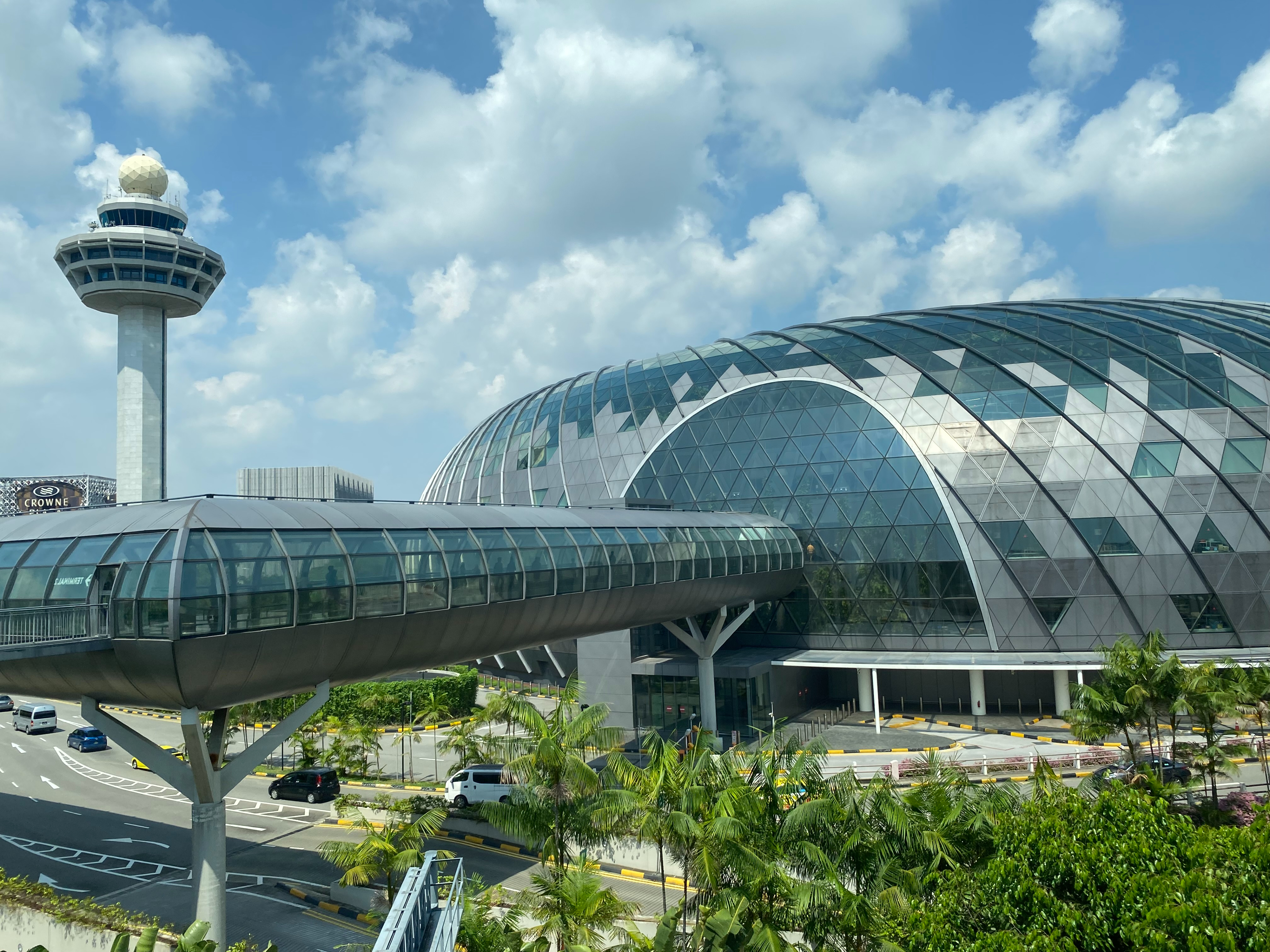
- IATA: SIN; ICAO: WSSS; WMO: 48698

Summary
- Airport type: Public / Military
- Owner: Singapore Government
- Operator: Changi Airport Group
- Serves: Singapore
- Location: Changi, East Region, Singapore
- Opened: 1 July 1981 (Soft launch); 29 December 1981 (Officially)
- Hub for: FedEx Express; Scoot; Singapore Airlines
- Time zone: SST (UTC+08:00)
- Elevation AMSL: 6.65 m (21.8 ft)
- Coordinates: 1°21′33″N 103°59′22″E
- Public transit access: CG2 Changi Airport
- Website: www.changiairport.com

Maps
- Location in Singapore SIN/WSSS (Southeast Asia) SIN/WSSS (Asia)
- Interactive map of Changi Airport

Runways
Direction	Length		Surface
Direction	m	ft	Surface
02L/20R (Note: Runway 02L is 4,000 metres (13,000 feet) and 20R is 3,260 metres (10,700 feet) with a displaced threshold of 740 metres (2,430 feet). Thus aircraft landing on 20R will have to avoid touching down on the displaced threshold but may use it for departures.)	4,000	13,123	Asphalt concrete
02C/20C (Note: This AIP Supplement informs aircraft operators and pilots that Runway 02C/20C and new taxiways at Singapore Changi Airport will be open for flights effective from 30 November 2023, 2000UTC.)	4,000	13,123	Asphalt concrete
02R/20L (Note: The runway is not open until the last quarter of 2027.)	4,000	13,123	Asphalt concrete

Statistics (2025 unless indicated otherwise)
- Passenger movements: ▲69,980,000
- Cargo movements (tonnes): ▲2,080,000
- Aircraft movements: ▲374,000
- Economic impact (2017): US$13.3 billion
- Social impact (2017): 119,000
- Sources: Changi Airport Group; WAD

Changi Airport (Note: Pronounced /ˈtʃɑːŋ.i/ CHAHNG-ee; Chinese: 樟宜机场; Malay: Lapangan Terbang Changi; Tamil: சாங்கி விமான நிலையம்.) (IATA: SIN, ICAO: WSSS) is the main international airport of Singapore, and functions as one of the most significant aviation gateways in the Asia-Pacific region. Situated within the Changi planning area in the eastern part of the country, the airport is approximately 24 kilometres (15 miles) east from the Central Area and occupies a site spanning about 25 square kilometres (9.7 square miles). The airport is a base for more than 100 international carriers with scheduled services linking Singapore to destinations across Asia, Oceania, Africa, Europe, the Middle East and North America. As of 2025, Changi Airport handled about 70 million passengers and ranked the 16th busiest airport by passenger traffic as well as the 4th busiest international airport by seat volume based on OAG's records.

Changi Airport serves as the headquarters for several aviation and ground handling entities. It is the home base of Singapore Airlines, the nation's flag carrier, along with its associated subsidiaries Singapore Airlines Cargo and Scoot, a regional low-cost carrier. The airport also hosts the operations of BOC Aviation, a major aircraft leasing firm. Ground and catering services are provided by SATS and dnata Singapore (formerly CIAS), whose facilities are located within the airport precincts. Owing to Singapore's central geographical location and high volume of international transit traffic, the airport has also been designated a principal cargo hub by FedEx Express, reinforcing its logistical and commercial importance within global air transport networks. The airport is managed by the Changi Airport Group, a corporate entity owned by the Singapore Government while solely maintained by the Ministry of Finance.

The airfield infrastructure comprises three operational runways, each measuring 4 kilometres (2.5 mi) in length. While the main airport code is WSSS, the third runway, designated 02R/20L, was formerly part of the adjacent Changi Air Base (East) and used by the Republic of Singapore Air Force (RSAF), carrying the ICAO code WSAC. The terminal complex includes four passenger terminals, of which Terminals 1, 2 and 3 are directly connected to Jewel Changi Airport, a mixed-use development featuring retail, dining and entertainment facilities integrated with airport infrastructure. A fifth terminal is currently under construction.

== Overview ==
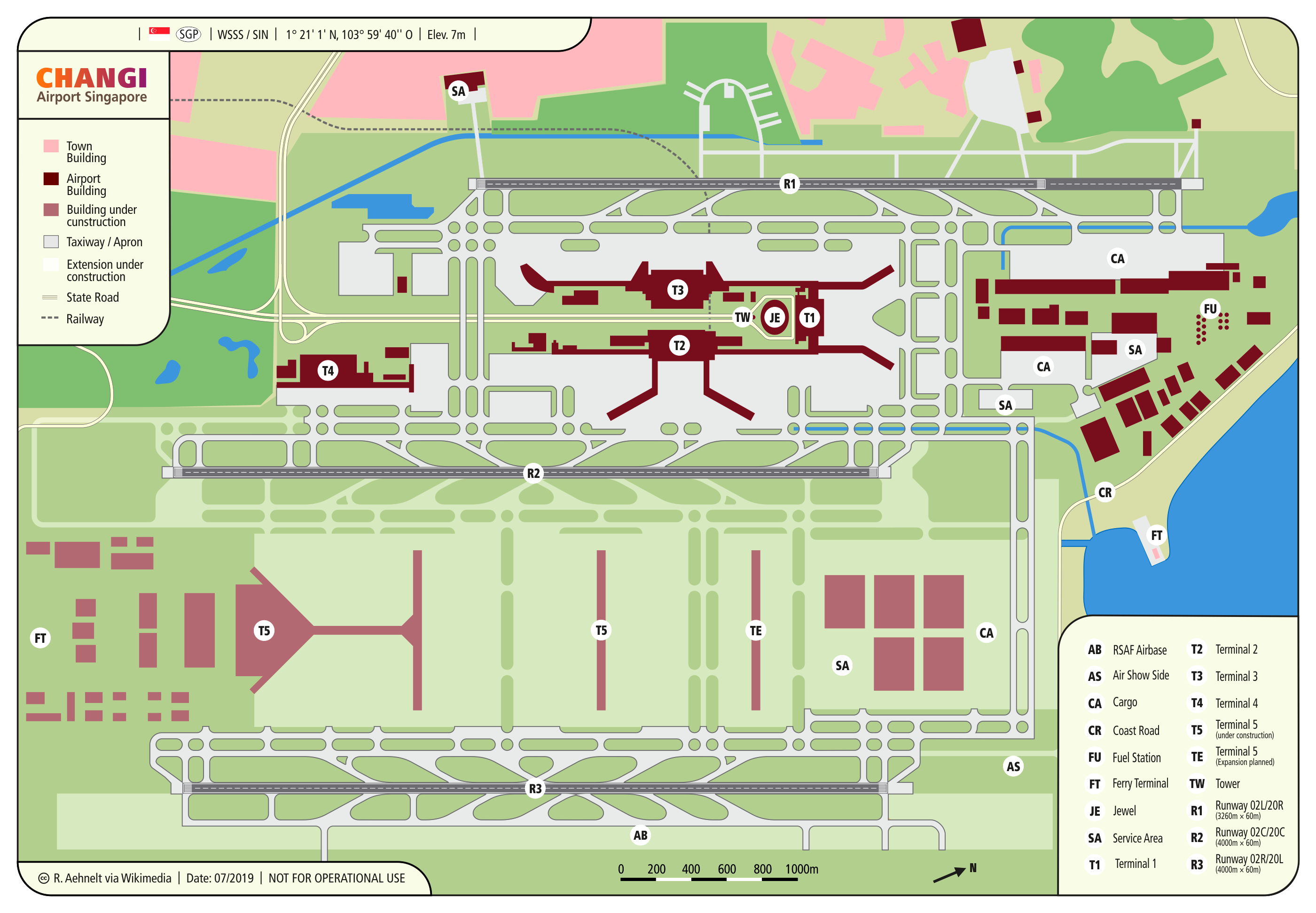
Map of Changi Airport

Changi Airport serves more than 100 airlines flying to 170 cities in around 100+ countries and territories worldwide. About 7,000 flights arrive or depart at Changi each week, or one every 80 seconds.

For the 2025 full-year figures published by the airport, the airport handled 69,980,000 passengers (a 3.4% increase compared to 2024), the highest in its 44-year history. This made it the fourth busiest international airport in the world and the seventh busiest in Asia Pacific. In December 2025, Changi Airport registered a total of 6.3 million passenger movements, with 20 December marking the year’s busiest day at 223,000 passengers across its terminals. In addition to being an important passenger hub, the airport is also one of the busiest cargo airports in the world, handling 2.08 million tonnes of air freight in 2025. Aircraft movements, comprising both landings and take-offs, increased 2.2% year-on-year to 374,000 movements in 2025.

The airport has won over 700 awards since its opening, including 28 "Best Airport" awards in 2025 alone. Changi Airport's efforts to mitigate the effects of ageing infrastructure include continual physical upgrades to its existing terminals and building new facilities to maintain its high standards in airport service quality. In 2026, Changi Airport also ranked fourth as one of the top 10 brands in Singapore in YouGov's Best Brands Rankings 2026 report.

== History ==
=== Conception ===
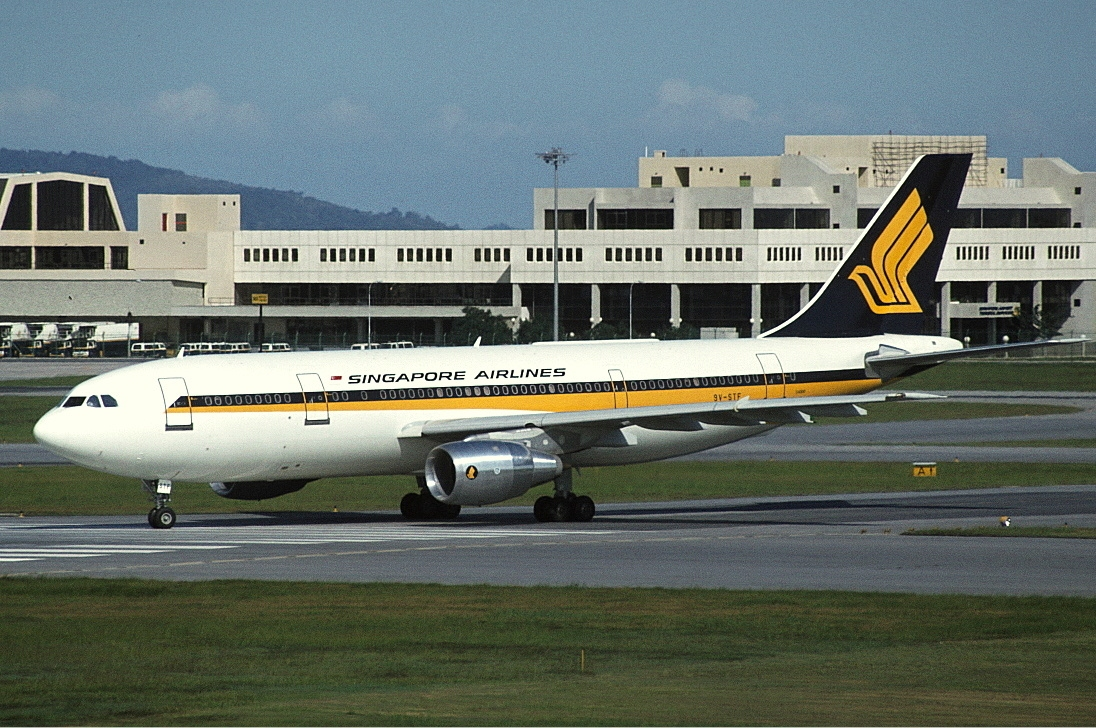
The Airbus A300 (9V-STF) of Singapore Airlines staying at Changi Airport (1983)

Prior to Changi, Singapore's main international airport was located at Paya Lebar. It had opened in 1955 with a single runway and a small passenger terminal, having itself replaced the previous Kallang Airport that began operations in 1937. The decision to move the airport from Paya Lebar to Changi was based on a number of factors. With the growth in global aviation transport, the airport was facing congestion problems. Its inability to cope with the rising traffic became critical by the 1970s; annual passenger numbers rose dramatically from 300,000 in 1955 to 1.7 million in 1970 and to 4 million in 1975. As a result, there was a need to accommodate the growing demand for air travel, the desire to establish Singapore as a global aviation hub, and the need to modernise the country's air transport infrastructure.

The Singaporean government had two options – expand the existing airport at Paya Lebar or build a new airport at another location. After extensive studies, a decision was made in 1972 to keep the airport at Paya Lebar, as recommended by aviation consultants. Plans were made for the building of a second runway and an extensive redevelopment and expansion to the passenger terminal building. A year later, however, the plans were reviewed again as the pressure to expand the airport eased because of the 1973 oil crisis.

Concerned that the existing airport was located in an area with potential for urban growth, which would physically hem it in on all sides, the government subsequently decided in 1975 to build a new airport at the eastern tip of the main island at Changi, at the existing site of Changi Air Base. However, as there was an increase in traffic, the airport still had to be expanded at that time. In addition, aircraft could fly over the sea, avoiding noise pollution issues within residential areas and avoid disastrous consequences on the ground in the event of an air mishap. Formerly known as the Singapore International Airport, the airport in Paya Lebar was subsequently converted for military use and renamed as Paya Lebar Air Base.

=== Construction ===
The original master plan for Changi Airport involved constructing a dual-terminal and dual-runway configuration over two phases with provisions for another two passenger terminals in the future. Phase 1 included the construction for the first passenger terminal, the first runway reusing and upgrading the main runway of Changi Air Base, 45 aircraft parking bays, support facilities and structures, including a large maintenance hangar, a fire station, workshops and administrative offices, an airfreight complex, two cargo agents buildings, in-flight catering kitchens and an 80 m (260 ft) control tower. Construction for the second phase would commence immediately after the completion of Phase 1 and include the second runway, 23 new aircraft parking bays in addition to the existing 45 bays, a second fire station and a third cargo agent building.

Changi Airport commenced commercial operations on 1 July 1981. Its first flight, Singapore Airlines SQ101, touched down that day at 7:10:00am Singapore Time with 140 passengers from Kuala Lumpur. It officially opened five months later on 29 December 1981. The airport ended its first year of operations with 12.1 million passengers, close to 200,000 tonnes of air freight handled and 63,100 aircraft movements. Subsequent phases opened progressively within the next few decades, with Terminal 2 opening for passenger traffic in 1990, Terminal 3 in 2008, and Terminal 4 in 2017. Terminal 5 is expected to open in mid-2030s.

== Terminals ==
=== Passenger terminals ===
Changi Airport has four main passenger terminals arranged with Jewel located in the centre of Terminals 1, 2 and 3. Currently, the airport has an operational capacity of 90 million passengers per annum (mppa) across four terminals.

Terminal	Date of opening	Location
Terminal 1	1 July 1981	Northern end
Terminal 2	22 November 1990	Eastern end
Terminal 3	9 January 2008	Western end
Terminal 4	31 October 2017	Southern end
Terminal 5	Mid-2030s	Southeastern end

The former JetQuay CIP Terminal site is being redeveloped into a new private terminal, which is expected to open in mid-2027.

The short-lived Budget Terminal was opened on 26 March 2006 and closed on 25 September 2012 to make way for Terminal 4.

=== Future terminals and projects ===
Terminal 5 (T5) is currently under construction. Lawrence Wong, the Prime Minister of Singapore and Minister of Finance, officiated the groundbreaking ceremony for Changi Airport T5 on 14 May 2025. The new terminal is expected to be ready by the mid-2030s.

Terminal 5 is expected to handle 50 million passenger movements per annum for Changi Airport. It will be built on reclaimed land to the east of the present terminals. It will be partially funded through an increased levy. KPF Singapore with Heatherwick Studio and Architects 61 will provide architectural services. Arup Singapore, Mott MacDonald Singapore and Surbana Jurong Consultants will provide engineering services while DP Architects will provide retail design services. The former Transport Minister Khaw Boon Wan said that the Changi Terminal 5 project was delayed by at least 2 years as a result of the COVID-19 pandemic.

=== Mixed-use facilities ===
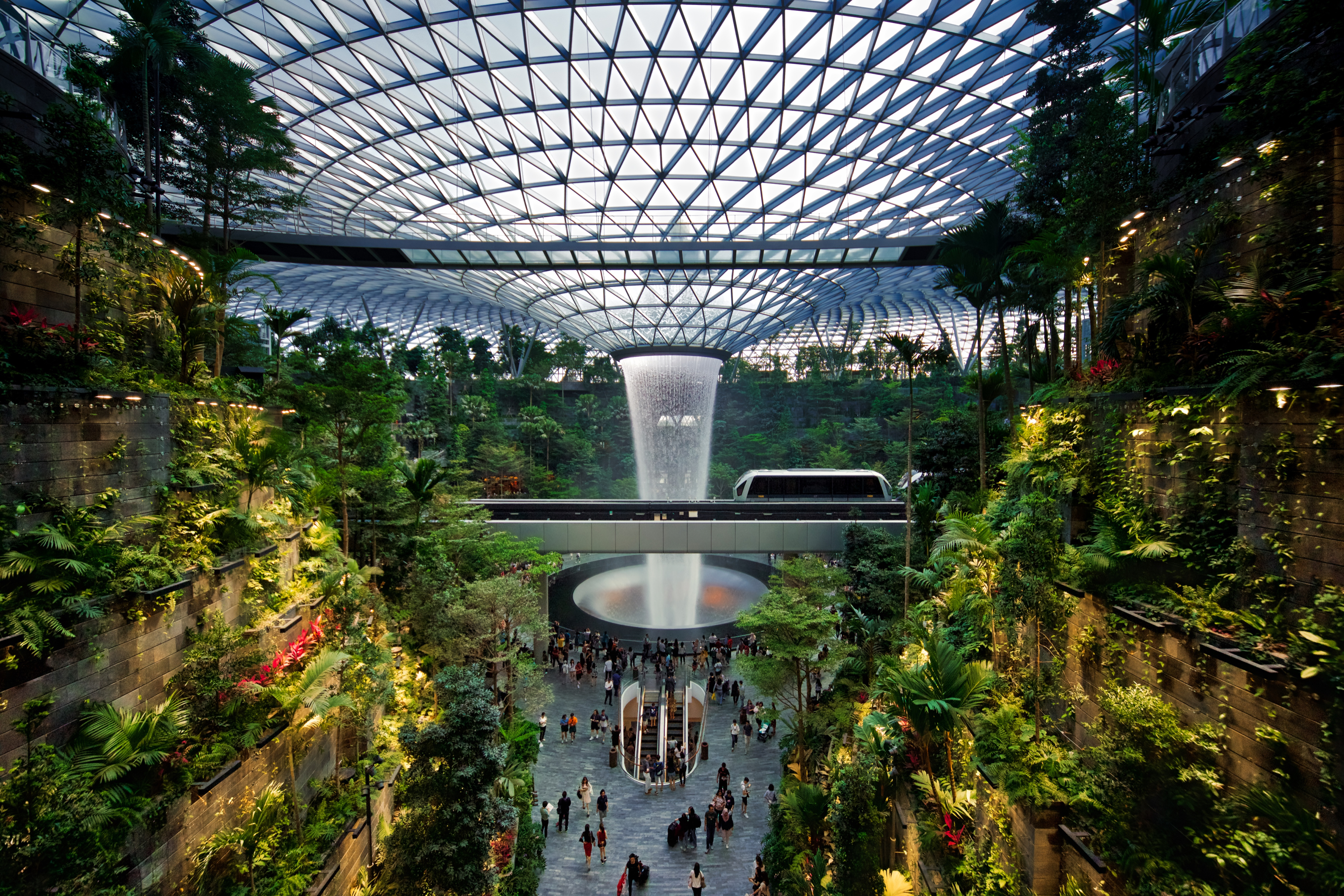
The Rain Vortex at Jewel Changi Airport

Jewel Changi Airport, which opened on 17 April 2019, is a nature-themed entertainment and retail complex interconnecting Terminals 1, 2 and 3. Announced in 2013, it is a new terminal-like structure that is intended to simultaneously be a mixed-use complex. It is situated on a 3.5-hectare site where the Terminal 1 car park used to reside, which has since been moved underground. Jewel was developed by Jewel Changi Airport Trustee Pte Ltd, a joint venture between Changi Airport Group and CapitaLand, through its wholly owned shopping mall business, CapitaLand Mall Asia. The project cost S$1.7 billion.

Part of this project was planned to help expand Terminal 1 to handle 24 million passengers per year by 2018 with stand-alone check-in facilities and lounges. The indoor waterfall (named "Rain Vortex") in the structure holds the World Record for the tallest indoor waterfall in the world at 40m high, cascading down 7 storeys.

=== Cargo terminal ===
The Air Hub & Cargo Development department of the Changi Airport Group (CAG) manages the Changi Airfreight Centre, which is located to the north of the airport premises.

In 2025, Changi Airport handled 2,080,000 tonnes of air freight, achieving one of its strongest cargo performance on record. The top five air cargo markets in 2025 were China, the United States, Australia, Hong Kong, and India.

Recent cargo volumes at Changi Airport have been heavily driven by global demand for semiconductors, artificial intelligence (AI) technology, electric vehicles, and cleantech.

Changi Airport has been honored frequently at the Asian Freight Logistics and Supply Chain (AFLAS) Awards, winning "Best Airport in Asia" for over 27 consecutive years. This award is determined via votes from Cargonews readers and authenticated by an independent auditor. Changi Airport has also been inducted into the Cargonews Asia Hall of Fame for its "sustained commitment to service and efficiency" as a premier airfreight hub.

=== Gallery ===
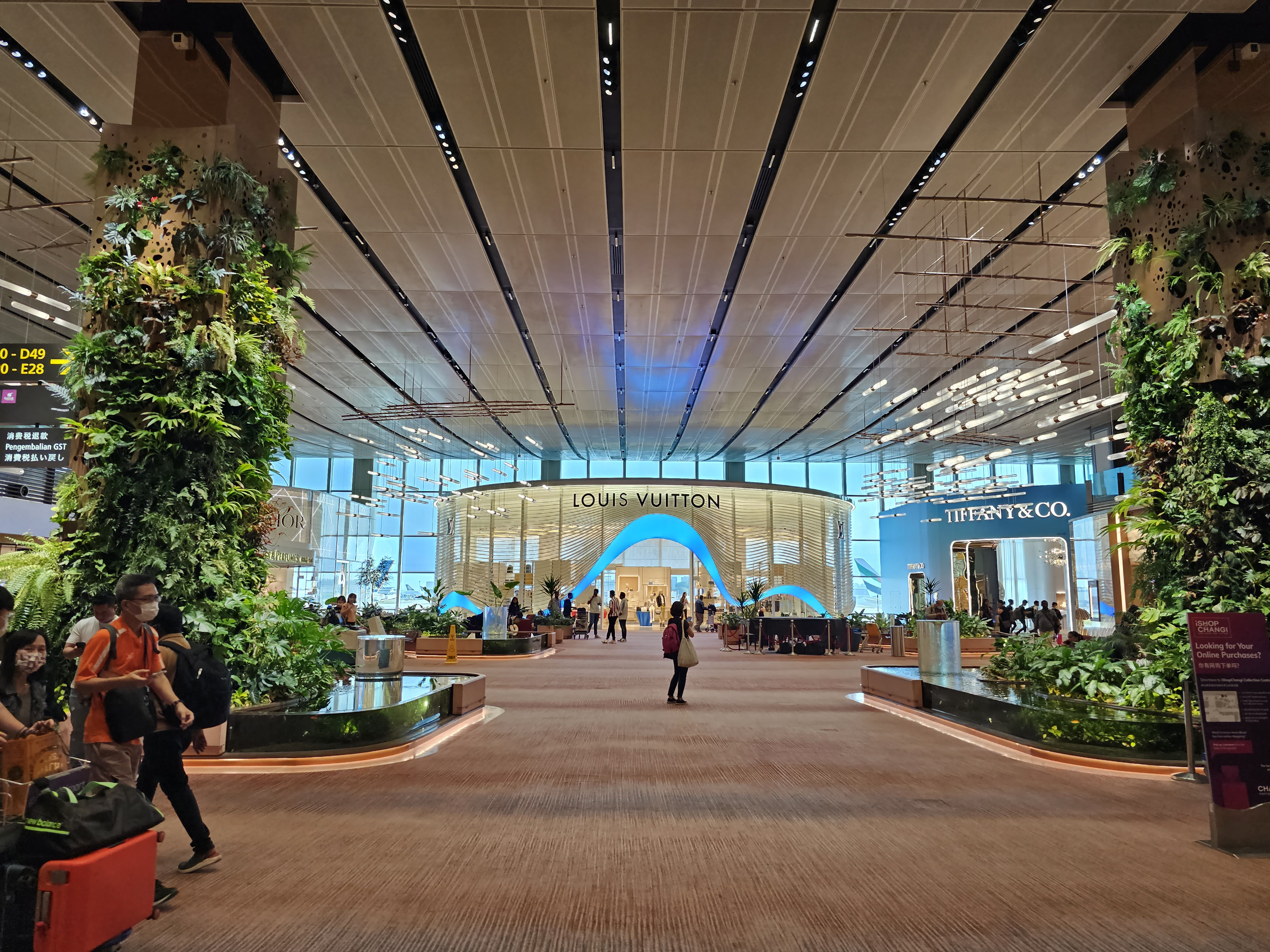
Terminal 1

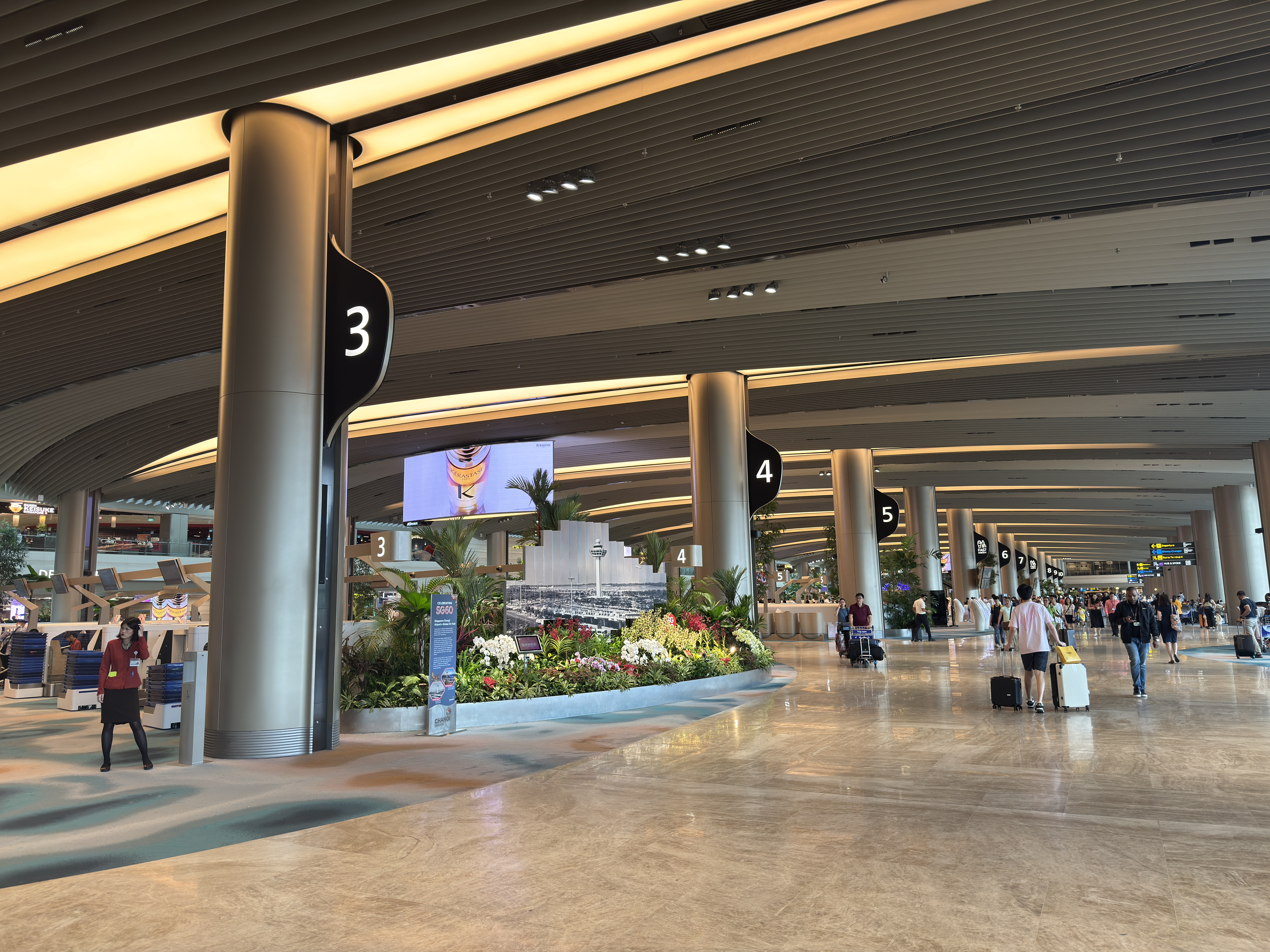
Terminal 2

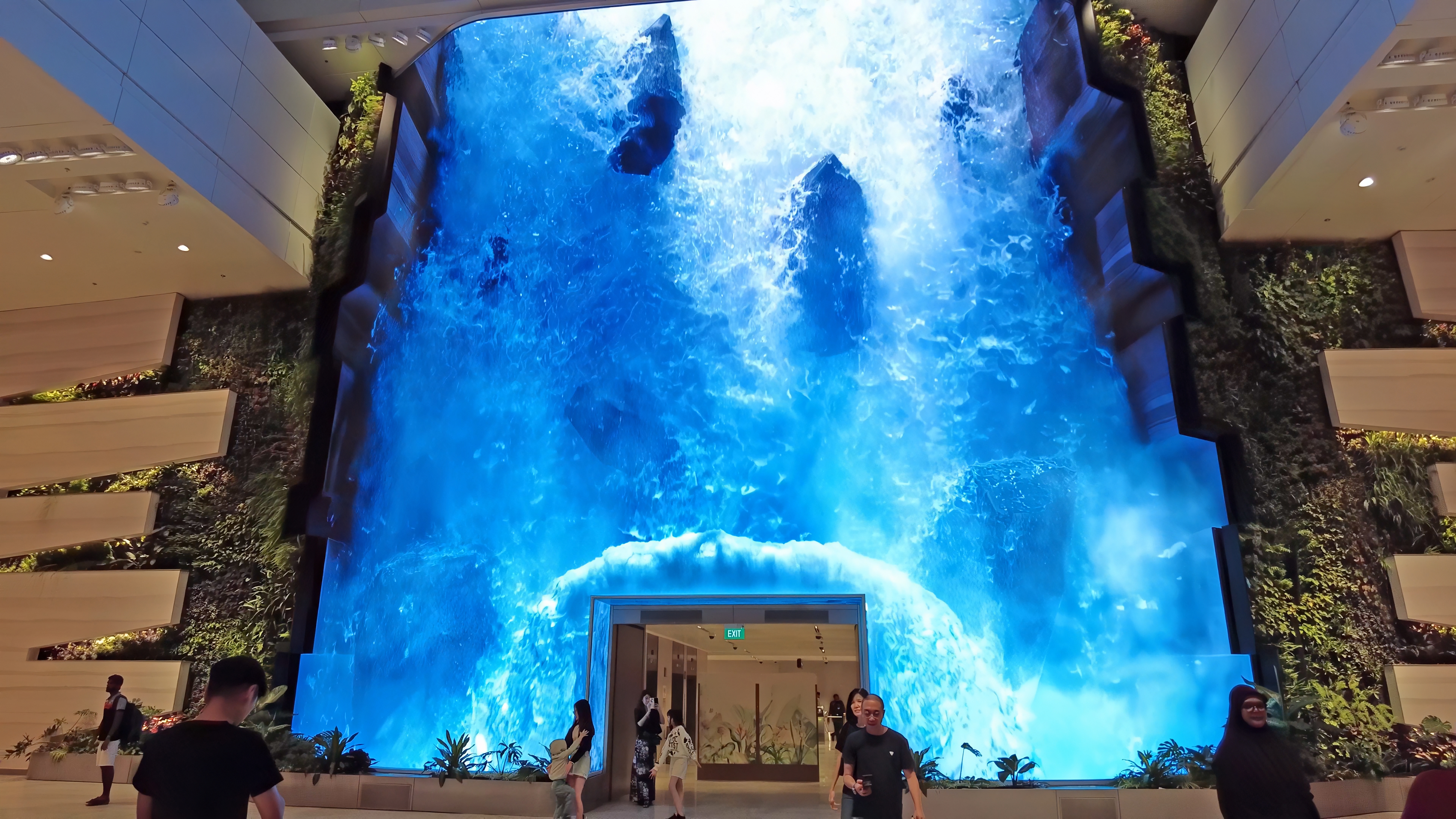
The Wonderfall at Terminal 2

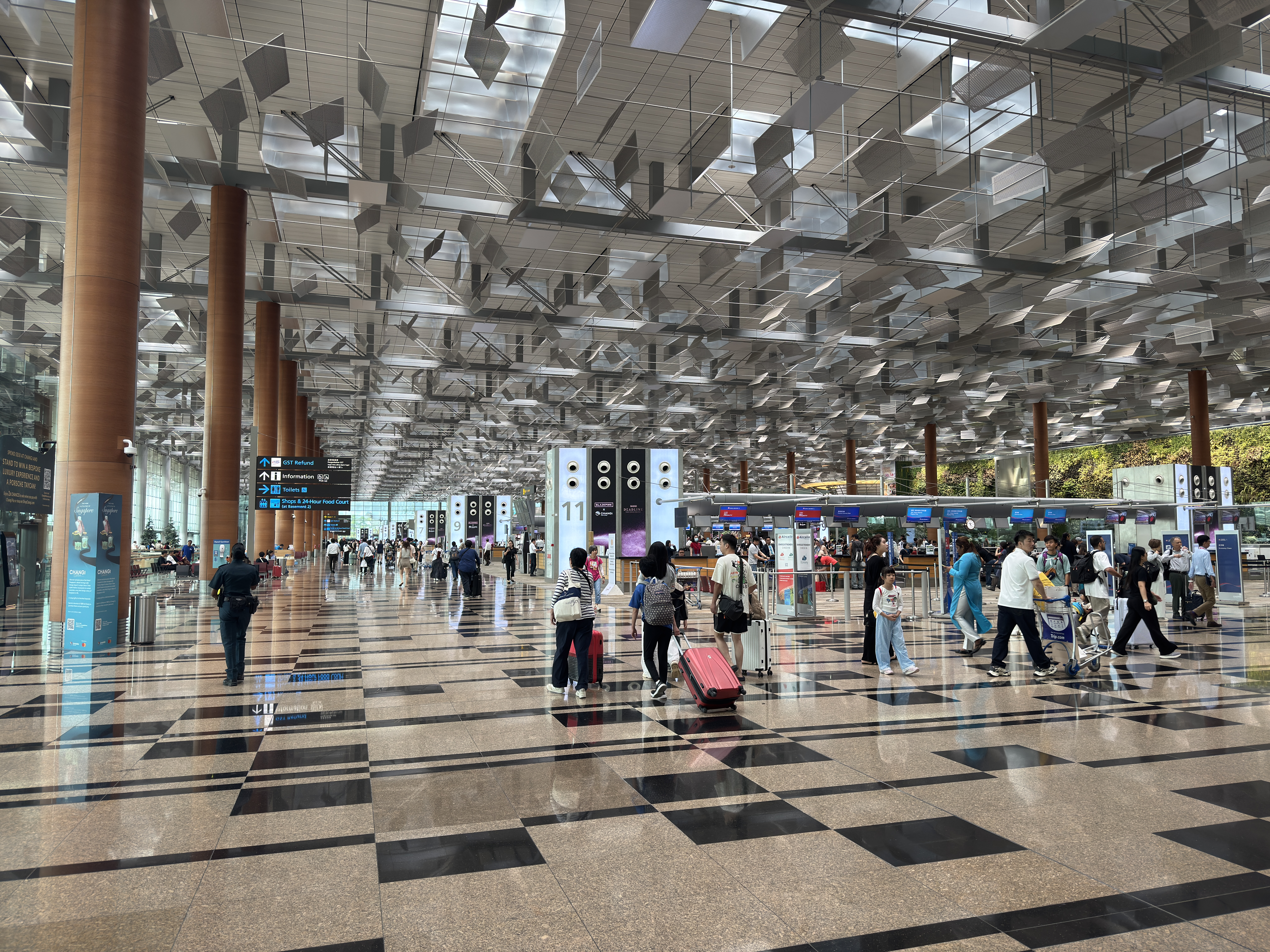
Terminal 3

Departure hall of Terminal 4

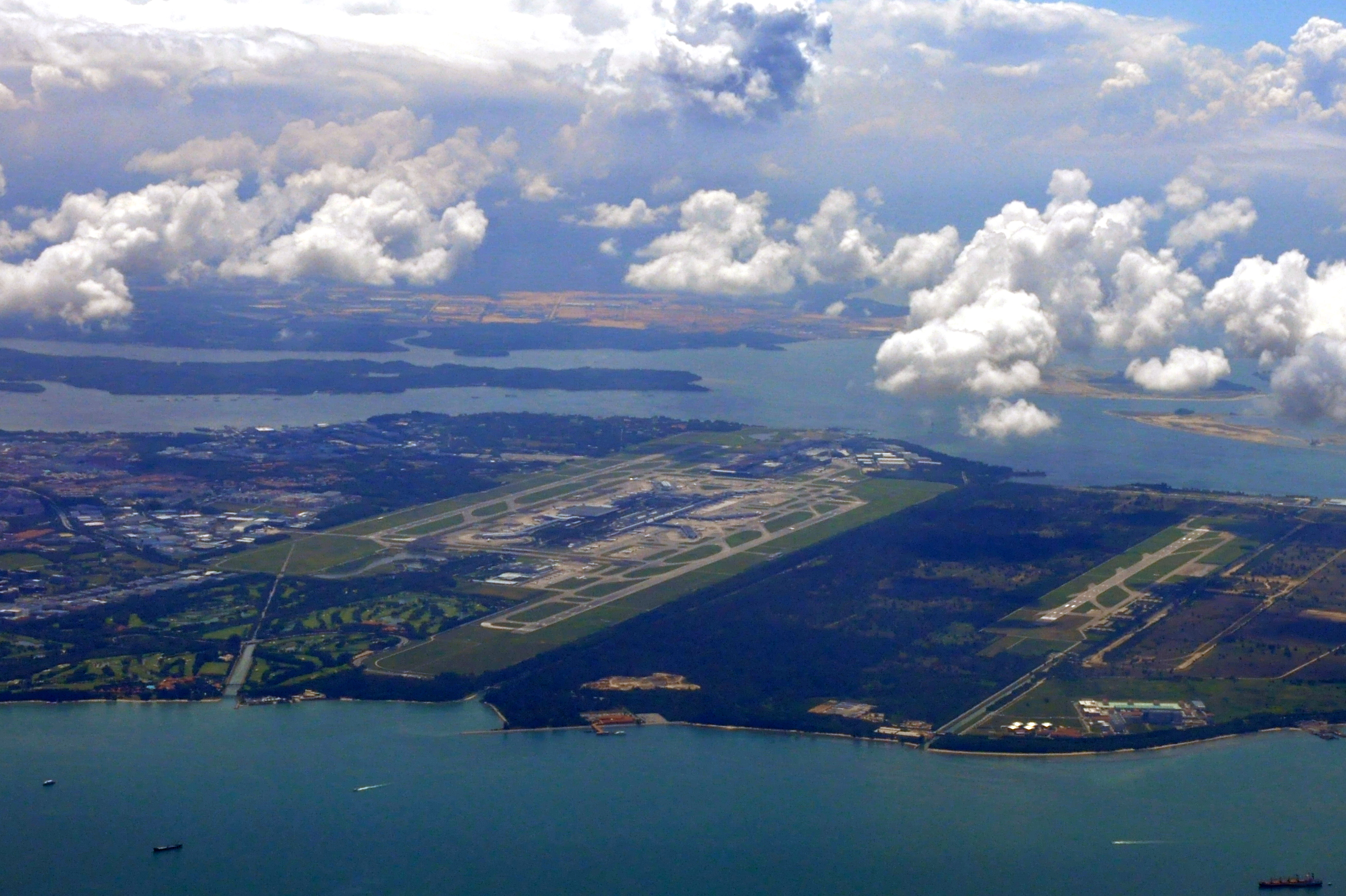
Aerial view of Singapore Changi Airport in 2011. The forested area to the right of its airfield has since been cleared for Terminal 5

== Operations ==
Changi Airport Group (Singapore) Pte Ltd (CAG) was formed on 16 June 2009 upon the corporatisation of Singapore Changi Airport by Civil Aviation Authority of Singapore (CAAS) as the licensee and operator of the airport.

=== Passenger operations ===
As the airport only handles international passenger traffic, all terminals in operation are equipped with immigration-processing facilities for international travel.

After recovering from a drop in passenger traffic as a result of the September 11 attacks in 2001 and the Severe Acute Respiratory Syndrome (SARS) epidemic in 2003, the airport saw rapid growth in traffic, which hit the 30-million mark for the first time in 2004. In March 2008, prior to the full effect of the 2008 financial crisis on the global economy, the airport was predicted to handle 50 million passengers by 2012 due to the opening of casinos in Singapore and the phased liberalisation of the ASEAN aviation sector. As predicted, the airport surpassed the 50-million mark in 2012.

On 18 December 2017, the airport surpassed the 60-million mark for the first time. The airport saw a record 65.6 million passenger movements in 2018 – beating 2017's record of 60 million passengers with a 5.5 per cent increase.

In 2019, Firefly, the sole turboprop operator in Changi Airport, moved to Seletar Airport to make way for their jet operations.

Due to the COVID-19 pandemic, passenger traffic fell in 2020 and 2021, resulting in Terminals 2 and 4 closing temporarily in May 2020. Terminals 1 and 3 remained open for passengers throughout, but were closed to the general public on 12 May 2021 along with Jewel, reopening on 1 September 2021. On 1 November 2023, Terminal 2 fully reopened after three and a half years of upgrading. The refurbished terminal features nature-themed decorations and a 14m-tall digital waterfall display called the Wonderfall.

=== Safety and security ===
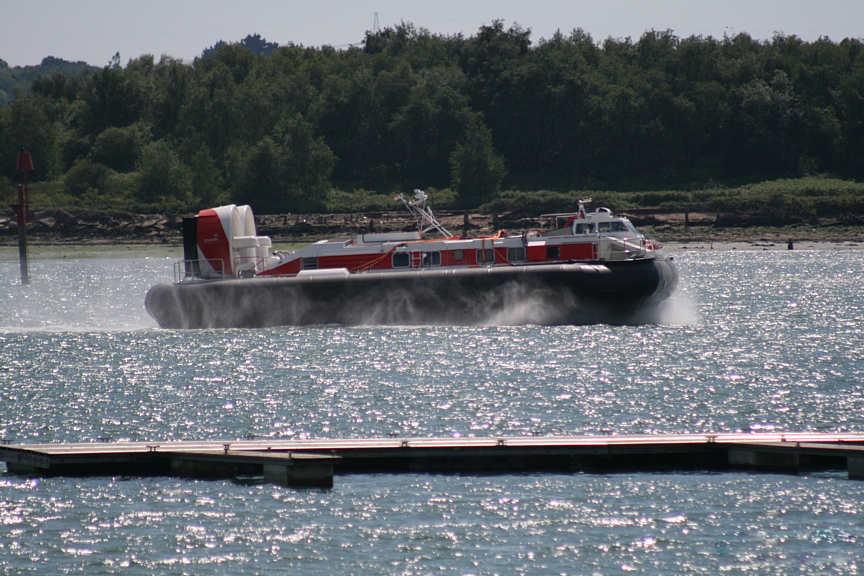
Singapore Airport Emergency Services Griffon

The Changi Airport Group (CAG) manages the overall safety and security of the airport. The Airport Management Division of the CAG manages the customer aspects of the airport's security, while the Aviation Security Unit oversees the airport's compliance with aviation security (AVSEC) policies, and manages AVSEC-related projects. The airport's emergency and fire-fighting services are handled by the Airport Emergency Service Division. The Airport Emergency Services handle all instances of rescue and fire-fighting within the airport premises as well as in surrounding waters. It operates from three main fire stations (Station 1 by Runway 1 along West Perimeter Road and Station 2 by Runway 2 and Station 3 by Runway 3), one sub-station (Domestic Fire Station), and one sea rescue base near the airport.

The airport's security comes under the regulatory purview of the Airport Police Division of the Singapore Police Force (SPF). The day to day discharge of security functions at the airport is performed by auxiliary police forces including Aetos Security Management, Certis (former CISCO) and SATS Security Services. Aetos and SATS Security Services are affiliated to the ground handling companies of dnata and SATS respectively. On 29 April 2008, CAAS signed its then-biggest single security contract for all airport-related security services by engaging Certis CISCO to provide security services at Singapore Changi Airport, as well as Seletar Airport, Changi Airfreight Centre, and the Singapore Air Traffic Control Centre. It involves the deployment of about 2,600 Certis Cisco personnel, including armed Auxiliary Police Officers and unarmed aviation security officers to perform tasks such as screening checked baggage, controlling access to restricted areas, and screening passengers before they board their aircraft.

Since the September 11 attacks and the naming of the airport as a terrorist target by the Jemaah Islamiyah, the airport's security was tightened. Prohibited items include sharp/blunt objects and liquids/gels/aerosols above 100ml. Devices larger than 7 inches are still needed to be removed for security screening. Duty-free shops that sells liquor are exempted from regulations.

== Airlines and destinations ==
=== Key markets and destinations ===
In 2025, China was the largest market for the airport, followed by Indonesia, Malaysia, Australia and India. Kuala Lumpur, Bangkok, Jakarta, Denpasar (Bali) and Hong Kong were the busiest routes for the year.

=== Passenger ===
Airlines	Destinations
9 Air	Guangzhou, Yinchuan
Aero Dili	Dili
Air Canada	Vancouver (ends 26 January 2027)
Air China	Beijing–Capital, Chengdu–Tianfu, Chongqing, Shanghai–Pudong
Aircalin	Noumea
Air France	Paris–Charles de Gaulle
Air India	Delhi–Indira Gandhi, Mumbai–Shivaji
Air India Express	Chennai, Tiruchirappalli
Air Macau	Macau
Air New Zealand	Auckland, Christchurch
Air Niugini	Port Moresby
AirAsia	Kota Kinabalu, Kuala Lumpur–International, Kuching, Langkawi, Penang
AirBorneo	Kuching
Aircalin	Nouméa
All Nippon Airways	Tokyo–Haneda, Tokyo–Narita
Asiana Airlines	Seoul–Incheon (ends 17 December 2026)
Bangkok Airways	Koh Samui
Batik Air	Jakarta–Soekarno-Hatta, Medan
Batik Air Malaysia	Ipoh, Kota Kinabalu, Kuala Lumpur–International, Kuala Lumpur–Subang, Penang
Biman Bangladesh Airlines	Dhaka
British Airways	London–Heathrow, Sydney–Kingsford Smith
Cambodia Airways	Sanya
Cathay Pacific	Hong Kong
Cebu Pacific	Cebu, Clark, Iloilo (resumes 24 November 2026), Manila
China Airlines	Kaohsiung, Taipei–Taoyuan
China Eastern Airlines	Beijing–Daxing, Fuzhou (begins 12 December 2026), Hangzhou, Hefei, Kunming, Nanchang, Nanjing, Ningbo, Shanghai–Pudong, Wuhan, Xi'an
China Southern Airlines	Guangzhou, Shenzhen
Chongqing Airlines	Chongqing
Citilink	Jakarta–Soekarno-Hatta
Drukair	Guwahati, Paro
Emirates	Dubai–International, Phnom Penh
Ethiopian Airlines	Addis Ababa, Kuala Lumpur–International
Etihad Airways	Abu Dhabi
EVA Air	Taipei–Taoyuan
Fiji Airways	Nadi
Finnair	Helsinki
Firefly	Kuala Lumpur–International
Garuda Indonesia	Denpasar, Jakarta–Soekarno-Hatta
Gulf Air	Bahrain, Kuala Lumpur–International
Hainan Airlines	Changchun, Haikou, Lanzhou, Yichang
IndiGo	Bengaluru, Chennai, Coimbatore, Delhi–Indira Gandhi, Hyderabad, Kolkata, Mumbai–Shivaji, Tiruchirappali, Vijayawada
Japan Airlines	Tokyo–Haneda, Tokyo–Narita
Jeju Air	Busan, Seoul–Incheon
Jetstar	Denpasar, Melbourne, Newcastle, Perth, Sunshine Coast
Juneyao Air	Shanghai–Pudong, Wuxi
KLM	Amsterdam, Denpasar
Korean Air	Seoul–Incheon
Loong Air	Hangzhou, Wenzhou, Zhangjiajie
Lufthansa	Frankfurt, Munich
Malaysia Airlines	Kuala Lumpur–International
MIAT Mongolian Airlines	Ulaanbaatar
Myanmar Airways International	Yangon
Myanmar National Airlines	Yangon
Oman Air	Muscat
Peach	Osaka–Kansai
Pelita Air	Jakarta–Soekarno-Hatta
Philippine Airlines	Manila
Qantas	Brisbane, Darwin, London–Heathrow, Melbourne, Paris–Charles de Gaulle, Perth, Sydney–Kingsford Smith
Qatar Airways	Doha
Royal Brunei Airlines	Bandar Seri Begawan
Saudia	Denpasar, Jeddah
SCAT Airlines	Sanya, Şymkent
Scoot	Amritsar, Athens, Balikpapan, Bandung–Kertajati, Bangkok–Suvarnabhumi, Cebu, Changsha, Chennai, Chiang Mai, Chiang Rai, Clark, Coimbatore, Da Nang, Davao, Denpasar, Fuzhou, Guangzhou, Guiyang, Haikou, Hangzhou, Hanoi, Hat Yai, Ho Chi Minh City, Hong Kong, Iloilo, Ipoh, Jakarta–Soekarno-Hatta, Jeddah (resumes 2 December 2026), Jeju, Jieyang, Koh Samui, Kota Bharu, Kota Kinabalu, Krabi, Kuala Lumpur–International, Kuala Lumpur–Subang, Kuantan, Kuching, Kunming, Labuan Bajo, Langkawi, Lombok, Macau, Makassar, Malacca, Manado, Manila, Medan, Melbourne, Miri, Naha, Nanjing, Nanning, Nha Trang, Osaka–Kansai, Padang, Palembang, Pekanbaru, Perth, Penang, Phu Quoc, Phuket, Pontianak, Qingdao, Sapporo–Chitose, Semarang, Seoul–Incheon, Shenyang, Sibu, Surabaya, Sydney–Kingsford Smith, Tanjung Pandan, Taipei–Taoyuan, Thiruvananthapuram, Tianjin, Tiruchirappalli, Tokyo–Haneda, Tokyo–Narita, Vienna, Vientiane, Visakhapatnam, Wuhan, Xi'an, Yogyakarta–International, Zhengzhou
Shandong Airlines	Jinan
Shanghai Airlines	Shanghai–Pudong
Shenzhen Airlines	Harbin, Shenzhen
Sichuan Airlines	Chengdu–Tianfu
Singapore Airlines	Adelaide, Ahmedabad, Amsterdam, Auckland, Bandar Seri Begawan, Bangkok–Suvarnabhumi, Barcelona, Beijing–Capital, Beijing–Daxing, Bengaluru, Brisbane, Brussels, Busan, Cairns, Cape Town, Cebu, Chengdu–Tianfu, Chennai, Chongqing, Christchurch, Colombo–Bandaranaike, Copenhagen, Da Nang, Darwin, Delhi–Indira Gandhi, Denpasar, Dhaka, Dubai–International (resumes 2 December 2026), Frankfurt, Guangzhou, Hangzhou, Hanoi, Ho Chi Minh City, Hong Kong, Hyderabad, Istanbul, Jakarta–Soekarno-Hatta, Johannesburg–O. R. Tambo, Kathmandu, Kochi, Kolkata, Kuala Lumpur–International, London–Gatwick, London–Heathrow, Los Angeles, Madrid, Malé, Manchester, Manila, Medan, Melbourne, Milan–Malpensa, Mumbai–Shivaji, Munich, Nagoya–Centrair, New York–JFK, Newark, Osaka–Kansai, Paris–Charles de Gaulle, Penang, Perth, Phnom Penh, Phuket, Riyadh (resumes 28 March 2027), Rome–Fiumicino, San Francisco, Seattle/Tacoma, Seoul–Incheon, Shanghai–Pudong, Shenzhen, Siem Reap, Surabaya, Sydney–Kingsford Smith, Sydney–Western (begins 23 November 2026), Taipei–Taoyuan, Tokyo–Haneda, Tokyo–Narita, Xiamen Yangon, Zurich; Seasonal: Sapporo–Chitose
Spring Airlines	Guangzhou, Shanghai–Pudong
SriLankan Airlines	Colombo–Bandaranaike
Starlux Airlines	Taipei–Taoyuan
Sun PhuQuoc Airways	Phu Quoc
Swiss International Air Lines	Zurich
Thai AirAsia	Bangkok–Don Mueang
Thai Airways International	Bangkok–Suvarnabhumi
Thai Lion Air	Bangkok–Don Mueang, Phuket
Tianjin Airlines	Guiyang
TransNusa	Denpasar, Jakarta–Soekarno-Hatta
Trinity Airways	Jeju, Seoul–Incheon
Turkish Airlines	Istanbul, Melbourne, Sydney–Kingsford Smith
United Airlines	San Francisco
US-Bangla Airlines	Dhaka
VietJet Air	Da Nang, Hanoi, Ho Chi Minh City, Nha Trang (begins 11 December 2026), Phu Quoc
Vietnam Airlines	Da Nang (begins 17 November 2026), Hanoi, Ho Chi Minh City
West Air	Chongqing, Lhasa
XiamenAir	Changsha, Fuzhou, Hangzhou, Nanjing, Xiamen
Zipair Tokyo	Tokyo–Narita

== Transport links ==
Entrance to Changi Airport MRT station from Terminal 3

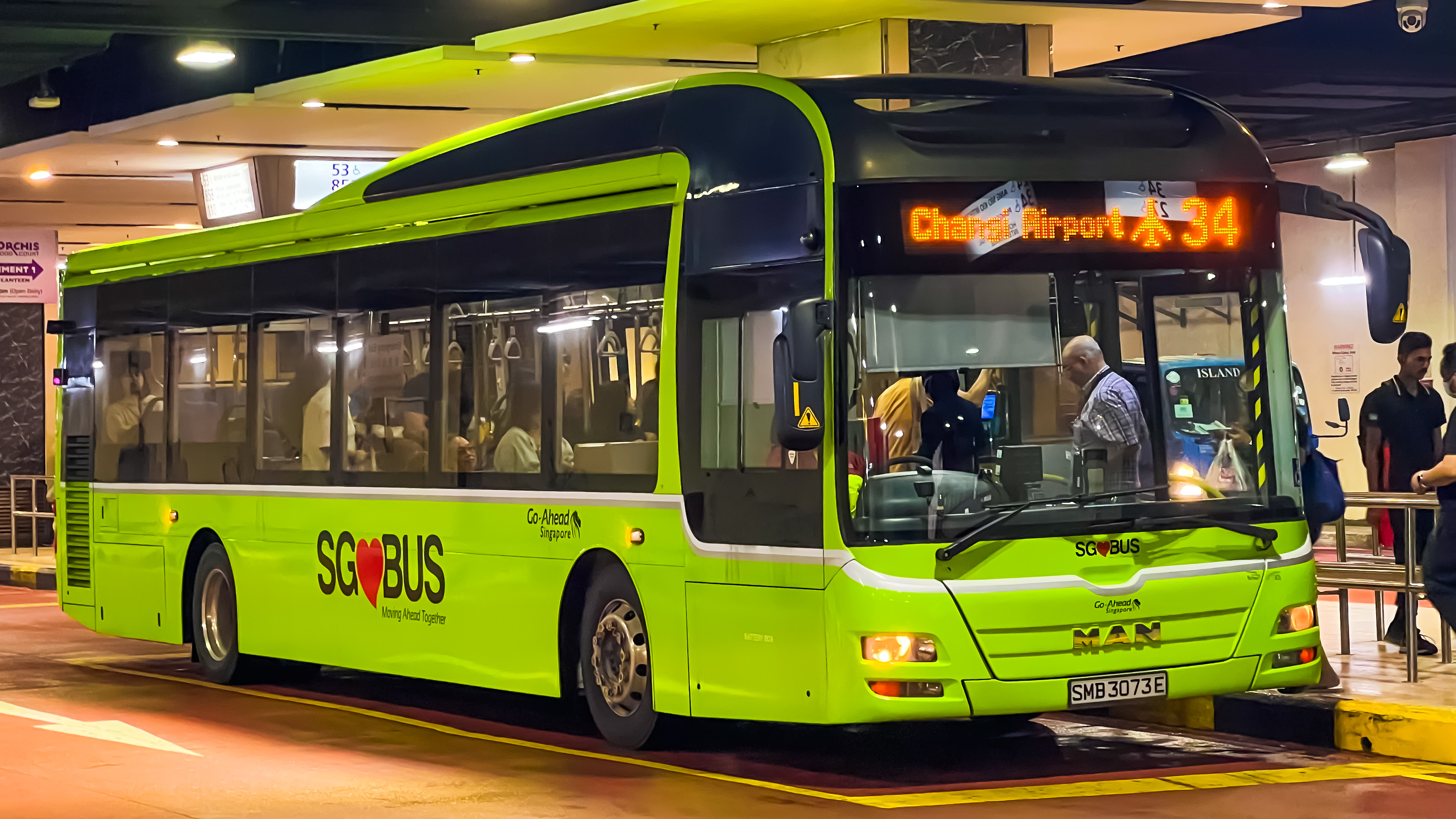
A public bus at the Terminal 2 basement bus bay

Terminals 1, 2 and 3 of the airport are linked by the free Skytrain service, operating daily from 05:00 to 02:00. During non-operational hours, travellers within the transit areas may transfer between terminals on foot via inter-terminal travelators, while those in the public areas can use the Mezzanine Level link bridges between T2 and T3, and the link bridge to travel on foot between T1 and T2/T3. Terminal 4 is accessible by a complimentary shuttle bus services at both public and transit areas. The shuttle bus journey between terminals at the public area takes about 10 minutes and the shuttle bus journey between terminals at the transit area takes between 10 and 18 minutes.

The airport is served by the Mass Rapid Transit (MRT) via a branch of the East West MRT line (EWL) from Tanah Merah MRT station with stops at Expo and Changi Airport, which lies underground between Terminals 2 and 3. Under the Land Transport Authority's (LTA) Masterplan, the Thomson-East Coast MRT line (TEL) will be extended to serve both Terminal 5 and the existing Changi Airport station, with the EWL branch set to be integrated into the TEL. On 25 July 2025, LTA announced a new Cross Island Line (CRL) interchange station CR1 Changi Terminal 5, which will directly connect the upcoming Changi Airport Terminal 5 to the city centre and other major hubs via the Thomson-East Coast Line extension (TELe) and the CRL.

Eight public bus services operated by SBS Transit, SMRT Buses, Tower Transit Singapore and Go-Ahead Singapore serve the airport in a loop through Terminals 1, 2 and 3, with Services 24, 34, 36, 44 (only during peak hours) and 110 continuing to Terminal 4. Bus stops are found at the basement bus bays of the main terminals, while Terminal 4's stop is located beside Car Park 4B. Taxis can be hired at designated stands in the arrival halls, with an airport surcharge applicable for all journeys originating there. Limousines and other transport options are available through the Ground Transport Concierge. Private pick-ups occur at the terminals' arrival areas, and car rental counters are found in each arrival hall. The 3.5 kilometres (2.2 miles) long Changi Airport Connector, launched in October 2020, links the airport to East Coast Park and features the 1 kilometre (0.62 miles) Changi Jurassic Mile trail with life-sized dinosaur sculptures. The Tanah Merah Ferry Terminal is connected to the airport by shuttle buses. A direct link to Terminal 5 is currently being studied.

== Awards ==
As one of the world's busiest airports for international passenger and cargo traffic, the airport has earned widespread acclaim for its service standards and facilities. It has been named the "World's Best Airport" by Skytrax thirteen times, including an unprecedented eight consecutive wins from 2013 to 2020. The airport is also consistently recognised for cleanliness, efficiency and seamless transit experience, having ranked highly in categories such as cleanest airport, best transit airport, best airport staff and immigration services. In 2024, Changi placed second globally in all three of the latter categories.

In 2025, Changi once again topped the Skytrax global rankings, adding a thirteenth title to its previous wins in 2000, 2006, 2010, 2013 to 2020 and 2023. Its reputation extends beyond the terminals, with the on-site Crowne Plaza voted the world's best airport hotel ten times, covering the years 2015 to 2020 and 2022 to 2025.

== Operational statistics ==
Operational statistics (1980–1989)
Year	Passenger movements	Passenger % change over previous year	Airfreight movements (tonnes)	Airfreight % change over previous year	Aircraft movements	Aircraft % change over previous year	Notes
1980	7,294,549	0.0	—N/a	—N/a	75,971	0.0	
1981	8,152,158	▲11.7%	—N/a	—N/a	71,365	▼6.1%	
1982	8,611,812	▲5.6%	—N/a	—N/a	68,159	▼4.5%	
1983	8,679,152	▲0.8%	—N/a	—N/a	67,594	▼0.8%	
1984	9,465,651	▲9.1%	—N/a	—N/a	70,674	▲4.5%	
1985	9,856,830	▲4.1%	—N/a	—N/a	73,223	▲3.6%	
1986	10,067,719	▲2.1%	352,806	0.0	73,022	▼0.3%	
1987	11,203,793	▲11.3%	419,099	▲18.8%	76,276	▲4.5%	
1988	12,595,286	▲12.4%	512,509	▲22.3%	82,930	▲8.7%	
1989	14,136,367	▲12.3%	577,610	▲12.7%	87,421	▲5.4%	

Operational statistics (1990–1999)
Year	Passenger movements	Passenger % change over previous year	Airfreight movements (tonnes)	Airfreight % change over previous year	Aircraft movements	Aircraft % change over previous year	Notes
1990	15,620,758	▲10.5%	623,841	▲8.0%	97,675	▲11.7%	
1991	16,285,039	▲4.3%	643,209	▲3.1%	108,728	▲11.3%	
1992	18,100,155	▲11.1%	719,004	▲11.7%	125,526	▲15.4%	
1993	19,987,214	▲10.4%	838,416	▲16.6%	136,762	▲8.9%	
1994	21,644,677	▲8.3%	1,009,764	▲20.4%	145,334	▲6.3%	
1995	23,196,240	▲7.2%	1,105,773	▲9.5%	156,334	▲7.6%	
1996	24,514,248	▲5.7%	1,190,457	▲7.6%	166,749	▲6.7%	
1997	25,174,344	▲2.7%	1,336,254	▲12.2%	172,672	▲3.5%	
1998	23,803,180	▼5.4%	1,283,660	▼4.0%	165,242	▼4.3%	1997 Asian financial crisis
1999	26,064,645	▲9.5	1,500,393	▲16.8	165,961	▲0.4	

Operational statistics (2000–2009)
Year	Passenger movements	Passenger % change over previous year	Airfreight movements (tonnes)	Airfreight % change over previous year	Aircraft movements	Aircraft % change over previous year	Notes
2000	28,618,200	▲9.8	1,682,489	▲12.1	173,947	▲4.8	
2001	28,093,759	▼1.83	1,507,062	▼11.6	179,359	▲3.1	September 11 attacks
2002	28,979,344	▲3.2	1,637,797	▲8.7	174,820	▼2.5	
2003	24,664,137	▼14.9	1,611,407	▼1.6	154,346	▼11.7	2002–2004 SARS outbreak
2004	30,353,565	▲23.0	1,775,092	▲10.1	184,932	▲19.8	
2005	32,430,856	▲6.8	1,833,721	▲3.3	204,138	▲10.3	
2006	35,033,083	▲8.0	1,931,881	▲5.4	214,000	▲4.8	
2007	36,701,556	▲4.8	1,918,159	▼0.7	221,000	▲3.3	
2008	37,694,824	▲2.7	1,883,894	▼1.8	232,000	▲5.0	
2009	37,203,978	▼1.3	1,633,791	▼15.3	240,360	▲3.6	2008 financial crisis

Operational statistics (2010–2019)
Year	Passenger movements	Passenger % change over previous year	Airfreight movements (tonnes)	Airfreight % change over previous year	Aircraft movements	Aircraft % change over previous year	Notes
2010	42,038,777	▲13.0	1,813,809	▲11.0	263,593	▲9.7	
2011	46,543,845	▲10.7	1,865,252	▲2.8	301,711	▲14.5	
2012	51,181,804	▲10.0	1,806,225	▼3.2	324,722	▲7.6	
2013	53,726,087	▲5.0	1,850,233	▲2.4	343,800	▲5.9	
2014	54,093,070	▲0.8	1,843,799	▼0.3	341,386	▼0.7	
2015	55,448,964	▲2.5	1,853,087	▲0.5	346,334	▲1.5	
2016	58,698,039	▲5.9	1,969,434	▲6.3	360,490	▲4.1	
2017	62,219,573	▲6.0	2,125,226	▲7.9	373,201	▲3.5	
2018	65,600,000	▲5.5	2,150,000	▲1.4	386,000	▲3.4	
2019	68,300,000	▲4.0	2,010,000	▼6.5	382,000	▼1.0	

Operational statistics (2020–2025)
Year	Passenger movements	Passenger % change over previous year	Airfreight movements (tonnes)	Airfreight % change over previous year	Aircraft movements	Aircraft % change over previous year	Notes
2020	11,800,000	▼82.8	1,540,000	▼23.3	125,000	▼67.2	COVID-19 pandemic
2021	3,053,000	▼74.1	1,947,000	▲26.1	109,000	▼13.2	COVID-19 pandemic
2022	32,200,000	▲954.7	1,850,000	▼5.0	219,000	▲100.9	
2023	58,900,000	▲82.9	1,740,000	▼5.9	328,000	▲49.8	
2024	67,700,000	▲14.8	1,990,000	▲14.6	366,000	▲11.6	
2025	69,980,000	▲3.38	2,080,000	▲4.52	374,000	▲2.19	

== Accidents and incidents ==
- 26 March 1991 – Singapore Airlines Flight 117, operated by an Airbus A310, was hijacked by four terrorists. The flight landed in Changi Airport at 22:15. The Singapore Special Operations Force stormed the aircraft, on the morning of 27 March. All four hijackers were killed, with only minor injuries among the surviving 123 passengers and crew, who were held hostage for more than eight hours.
- 4 November 2010 – Qantas Flight 32, operated by an Airbus A380-800 with Rolls-Royce Trent 900 engines, had an uncontained engine failure and returned to Changi Airport. Upon landing, one of the engines could not be shut down due to ruptured control cables and had to be doused for three hours by airport firefighters to forcefully shut it down. There were no crew or passenger injuries, and all 469 people on board survived the accident. The aircraft was also repaired.
- 27 June 2016 – Singapore Airlines Flight 368, a scheduled service from Changi Airport to Milan, Italy carrying 222 passengers and 19 crew, caught fire shortly after it landed. Approximately three hours into the flight, the Boeing 777 turned back after the pilot received an engine oil warning message. Shortly after landing, the right engine and wing were ablaze, with flames engulfing the right side of the jet. No one was injured. The aircraft was later repaired and placed back into service.
- 16 May 2017 – a fire broke out at the departure hall in Terminal 2. The fire caused 40 flights at Terminal 2 to be delayed and diverted to Terminal 3. Terminal 2 was closed from 17:30 to 22:45.
- 29 November 2017 – a tow tug towing a Singapore Airlines Boeing 777-200 caught fire. This fire was promptly put out by the airport's emergency services. A member of the towing crew was in the aircraft's cockpit when the fire occurred; the crew member evacuated through the aircraft's emergency slides. The aircraft was substantially damaged by the fire and written off.
- 6 February 2018 – a KAI T-50 Golden Eagle, part of the Black Eagles aerobatic team taking part in Singapore Airshow 2018, veered off the runway during takeoff and crashed. The resulting fire was put out by emergency services and the pilot was treated for minor injuries. Runway 02L/20R was closed as a result and caused delays at the airport.

== See also ==
- Airport Logistics Park
- History of Changi Airport
- Infrastructure of Changi Airport
- Jewel Changi Airport
- Kinetic Rain
- List of airports with triple takeoff/landing capability
- List of busiest airports by passenger traffic
