= Infrastructure of Changi Airport =

Air and passenger facilities at Singapore Changi Airport

Infrastructure of Changi Airport

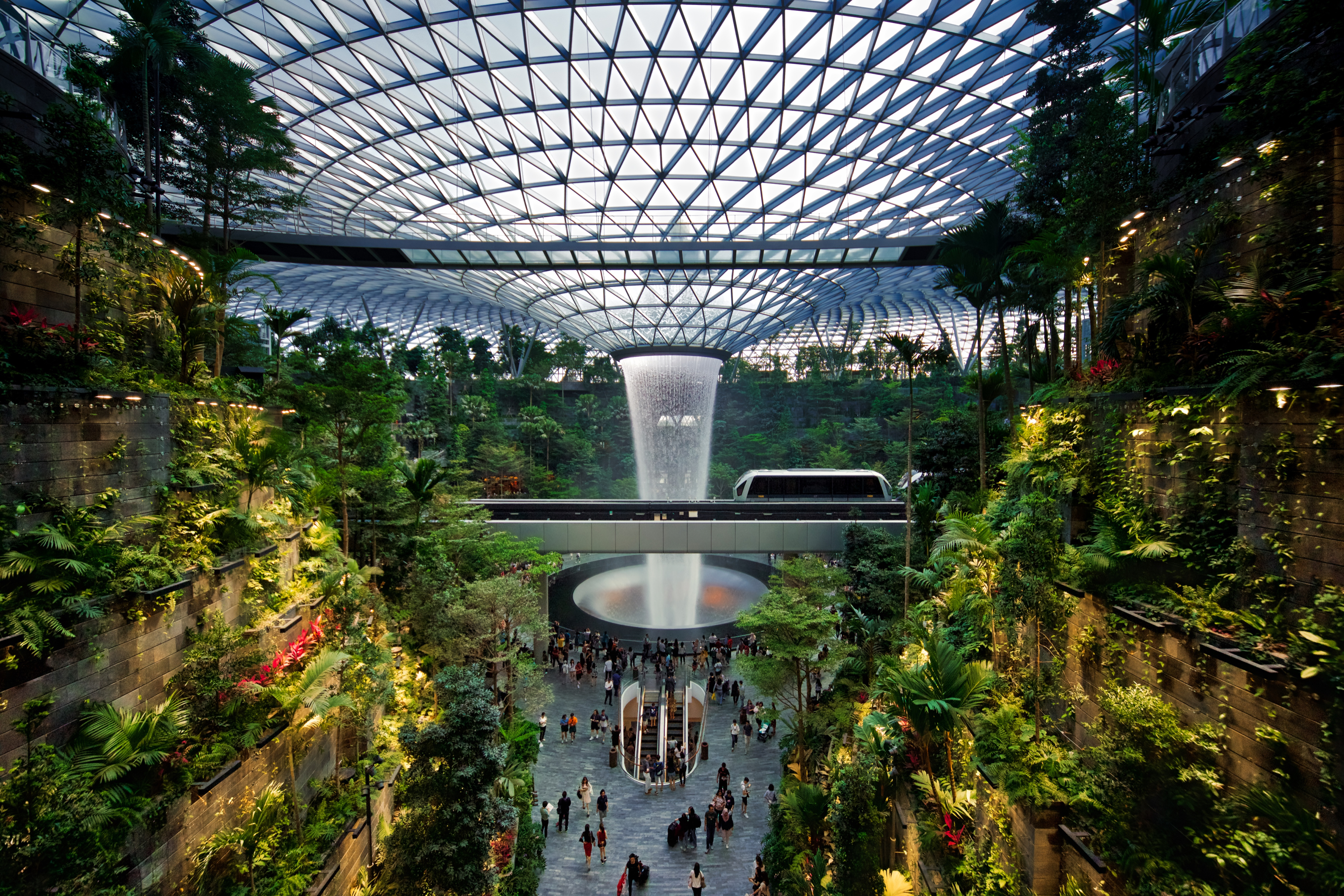
Jewel Changi Airport

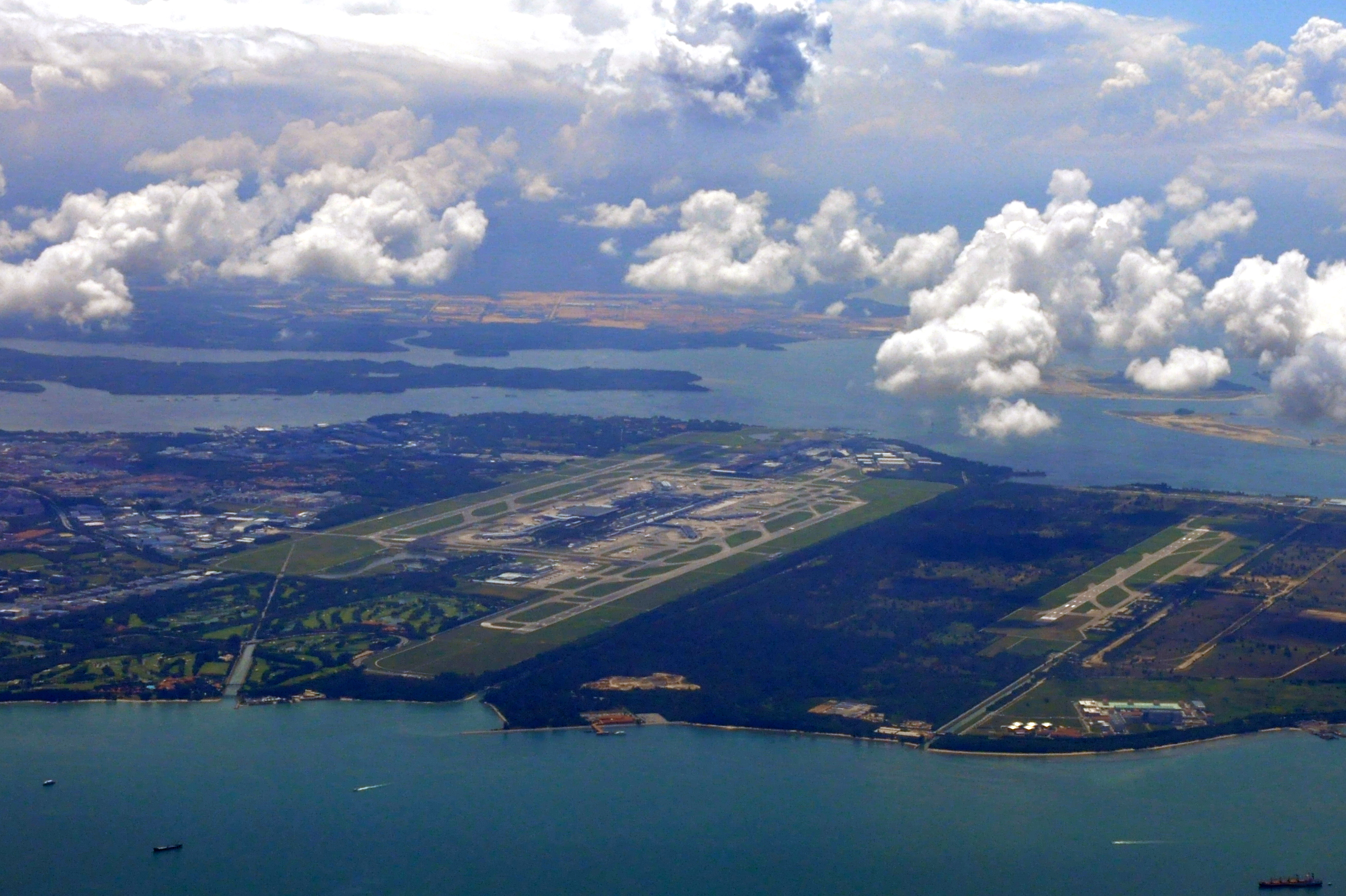
Aerial view of Singapore Changi Airport during the early 2010s. The forested area to the right of the airfield has since been cleared for Terminal 5 and various other developments.

Changi Airport is Singapore's primary international airport and a major aviation hub in the Asia-Pacific region. It is one of the commercial airports in Singapore, the other being Seletar Airport. Since the rankings for the World's Best Airport by Skytrax began in 1999, the airport was classified as the world's best twelve times, including for eight consecutive years from 2013 to 2021.

The infrastructure of Changi Airport includes passenger terminals, runways, taxiways, maintenance buildings and services, and ground support equipment. Its four current passenger terminals can handle 82 million passengers a year. When Terminal 5 is completed, it is expected to handle an additional 50 million passengers per year.

The airport is located approximately 25 km (16 mi) east north-east of the city's commercial centre, on a 24-square-kilometre (9.3 sq mi; 2,400 ha; 5,900-acre) site on the easternmost point of Singapore Island.

== Background ==
Given limited land resources in Singapore, Singapore Changi Airport was developed on reclaimed land on the eastern part of the island. As the country's primary international airport, it was designed for current needs and future expansion to double its passenger handling. Land can further be reclaimed from the sea for more runways and terminal buildings.

The master plan initially involved a dual-terminal and dual-runway configuration over two phases, with provisions for another two passenger terminals. Phase 1 included the construction of Terminal 1, the first runway, 45 aircraft parking bays, support facilities and structures, including a large maintenance hangar, the first fire station, workshops and administrative offices, an airfreight complex, two cargo agents' buildings, in-flight catering kitchens, and an 80 m (260 ft) control tower. Phase 2 construction commenced immediately after the completion of phase 1. It included the construction of Terminal 2, the second runway, 23 additional aircraft parking bays, a second fire station, and a third cargo agents' building.

== Control tower ==
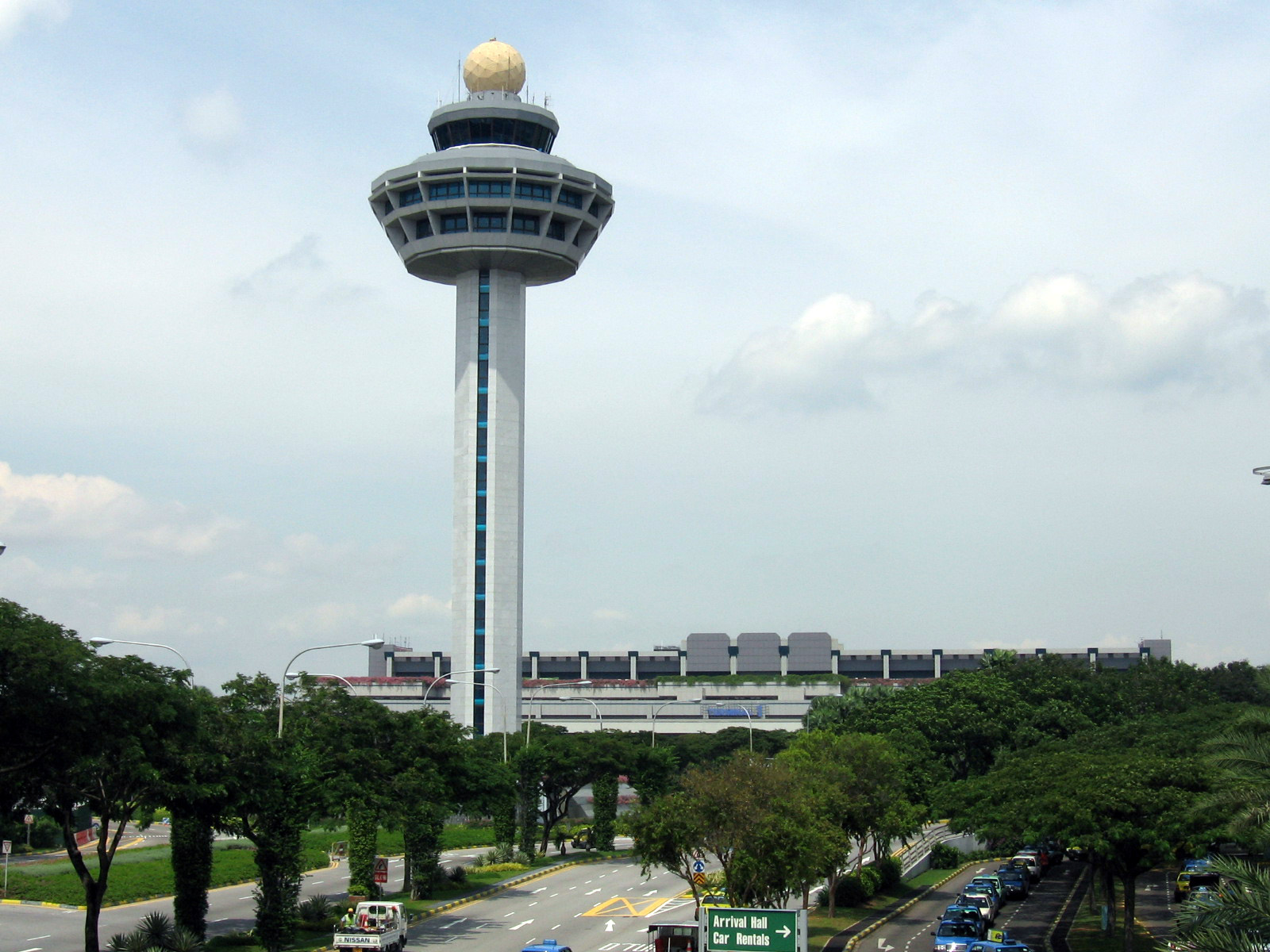
Changi control tower

The air traffic control tower (ATC) was constructed in phase 1, sited in between the first two runways and stands at about 81 m above mean sea level (AMSL). It provides aerodrome control service to aircraft landing, departing and maneuvering within the airport.

== Runways ==
Changi Airport started off with a single 4,000 by 60 m (13,123 by 197 ft) runway (02/20). After phase 2 was completed, it had two parallel runways of size 4,000 by 60 m (13,123 by 197 ft) each, designated 02L/20R and 02R/20L. 02L/20R was completed in 1981 with a displaced threshold of 740 m (2,428 ft) leaving the rest of the runway at 3,260 m (10,696 ft) long. 02C/20C (formerly named 02R/20L) was built completely on reclaimed land and opened with phase 2, 1.6 km (0.99 mi) to the east of 02L/20R. Four instrument landing systems (ILS) are installed on the two runways to guide landing aircraft safely under all weather conditions. Both runways are also used by the Republic of Singapore Air Force as part of Changi Airbase.

A new parallel runway 02R/20L (named 01/19 when it was opened in 2004) was built 1.8 km (1.1 mi) to the east of 02C/20C. It was used only by the Republic of Singapore Air Force as part of Changi Air Base. Originally at a length of 2.75 km, it has been lengthened to 4 km to handle larger commercial passenger aircraft. Almost 40 km of new taxiways were built to connect the runway with the main airport. New facilities such as navigation aids, airfield lighting systems and a fire station were included.

Runway information, radio navigation & landing aids
Runway name	Runway direction	Magnetic heading	Type of surface	Length (m)		Width (m)	Instrument landing system name (IDENT)	Frequencies (MHz)			ILS categories for precision approach and landing	Users	
Runway name	Runway direction	Magnetic heading	Type of surface	Land	Depart	Width (m)	Instrument landing system name (IDENT)	Instrument landing system localizer (ILS-LLZ)	Instrument landing system glide path (ILS-GP)	Instrument landing system distance measuring equipment (ILS-DME)	ILS categories for precision approach and landing	Commercial	Military
02L/20R	02L	023.02°	Grooved Bituminous concrete	4,000	4,000	60	ICW	110.90	330.80	CH46X	CAT II	✓	✓
02L/20R	20R	203.02°	Grooved Bituminous concrete	3,260	4,000	60	ICH	108.90	329.30	CH26X	CAT I	✓	✓
02C/20C	02C	023.02°	Bituminous concrete	4,000	4,000	60	ICE	108.30	334.10	CH20X	CAT II	✓	✓
02C/20C	20C	203.02°	Bituminous concrete	4,000	4,000	60	ICC	109.70	333.20	CH34X	CAT II	✓	✓
02R/20L	02R	023.01°	Grooved Bituminous concrete	4,000	4,000	60	ICX	110.50	329.60	CH42X	CAT II	✓	✓
02R/20L	20L	203.01°	Grooved Bituminous concrete	4,000	4,000	60	ICZ	108.55	329.75	CH22Y	CAT II	✓	✓

== Air traffic service communication facilities ==
Air traffic service communication facilities
Service designation	Call sign	Frequencies (MHz)	Hours of operation (SST)	Remarks
Air Control Center (ACC)	Singapore Radar	124.050	0000-1530	Flow control service: arrival & departure aircraft
Air Control Center (ACC)	Singapore Radar	133.250	24 hr – 7-day	North
Air Control Center (ACC)	Singapore Radar	134.400	24 hr – 7-day	South
Air Control Center (ACC)	Singapore Radar	123.700	24 hr – 7-day	East
Air Control Center (ACC)	Singapore Radar	134.200	24 hr – 7-day	South-east
Approach (APP)	Singapore Changi Arrival	119.300	24 hr – 7-day	Intermediate & final approach
Approach (APP)	Singapore Changi Approach	120.300	24 hr – 7-day	Intermediate approach
Tower (TWR)	Singapore Changi Control Tower	118.250	0000-1600	Runway 02C/20C
Tower (TWR)	Singapore Changi Control Tower	118.600	24 hr – 7-day	All departures (takeoff) & arrivals (landing)
Tower (TWR)	Singapore Changi Control Tower	118.600	0000-1600	Runway 02L/20R
Tower (TWR)	Singapore Changi Ground Movement Control	121.725	0000-1700	Aircraft east of Terminal 2
Tower (TWR)	Singapore Changi Ground Movement Control	121.725	2100-0000	Aircraft east of Terminal 2
Tower (TWR)	Singapore Changi Ground Movement Control	121.850	0000-1800	Aircraft north of Terminal 1
Tower (TWR)	Singapore Changi Ground Movement Control	121.850	2300-0000	Aircraft north of Terminal 1
Tower (TWR)	Singapore Changi Ground Movement Control	124.300	1600-0000	Start-up/push-back/taxiing of all aircraft
Tower (TWR)	Singapore Changi Ground Movement Control	124.300	0000-1600	Aircraft west of Terminal 3
Tower (TWR)	Singapore Delivery	121.650	24 hr – 7-day	Pre-flight check/ATC clearance
Tower (TWR)	Singapore Changi Apron	121.900	24 hr – 7-day	Vehicular movements on taxiways and runways

== Airport hotel ==
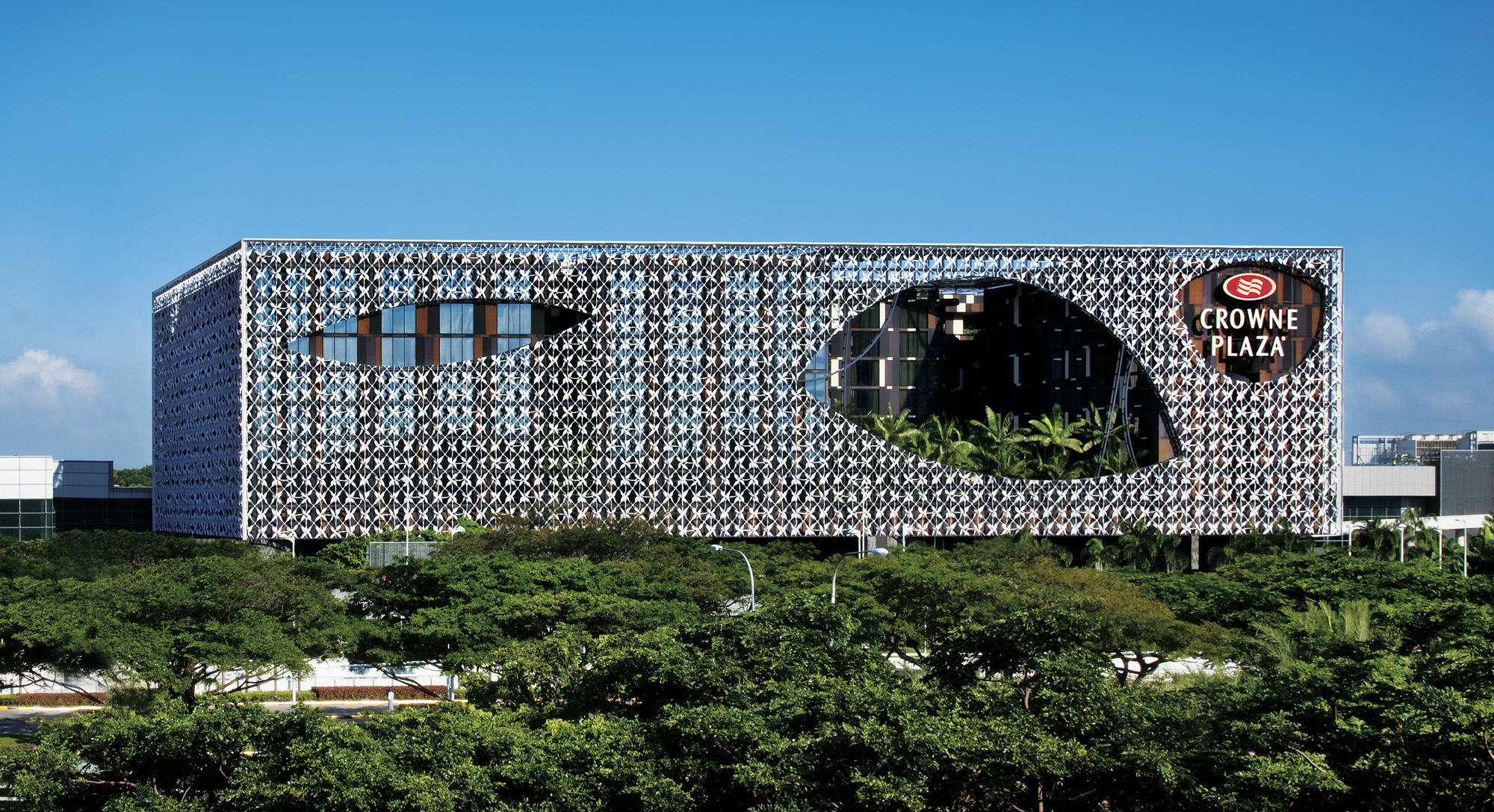
Crowne Plaza at Changi Airport

The Crowne Plaza Changi Airport hotel, designed by WOHA, is linked to Changi Airport Terminal 3, with Terminals 1 and 2 reachable by Skytrain located within the immediate vicinity of Changi Airport. It is nine storeys high and has 320 guest rooms. A 10-storey extension was completed in 2016, increasing the total number of rooms to 563. In 2024, the hotel was named the world's best airport hotel by Skytrax for the ninth year running.

== Airbus A380 operations ==
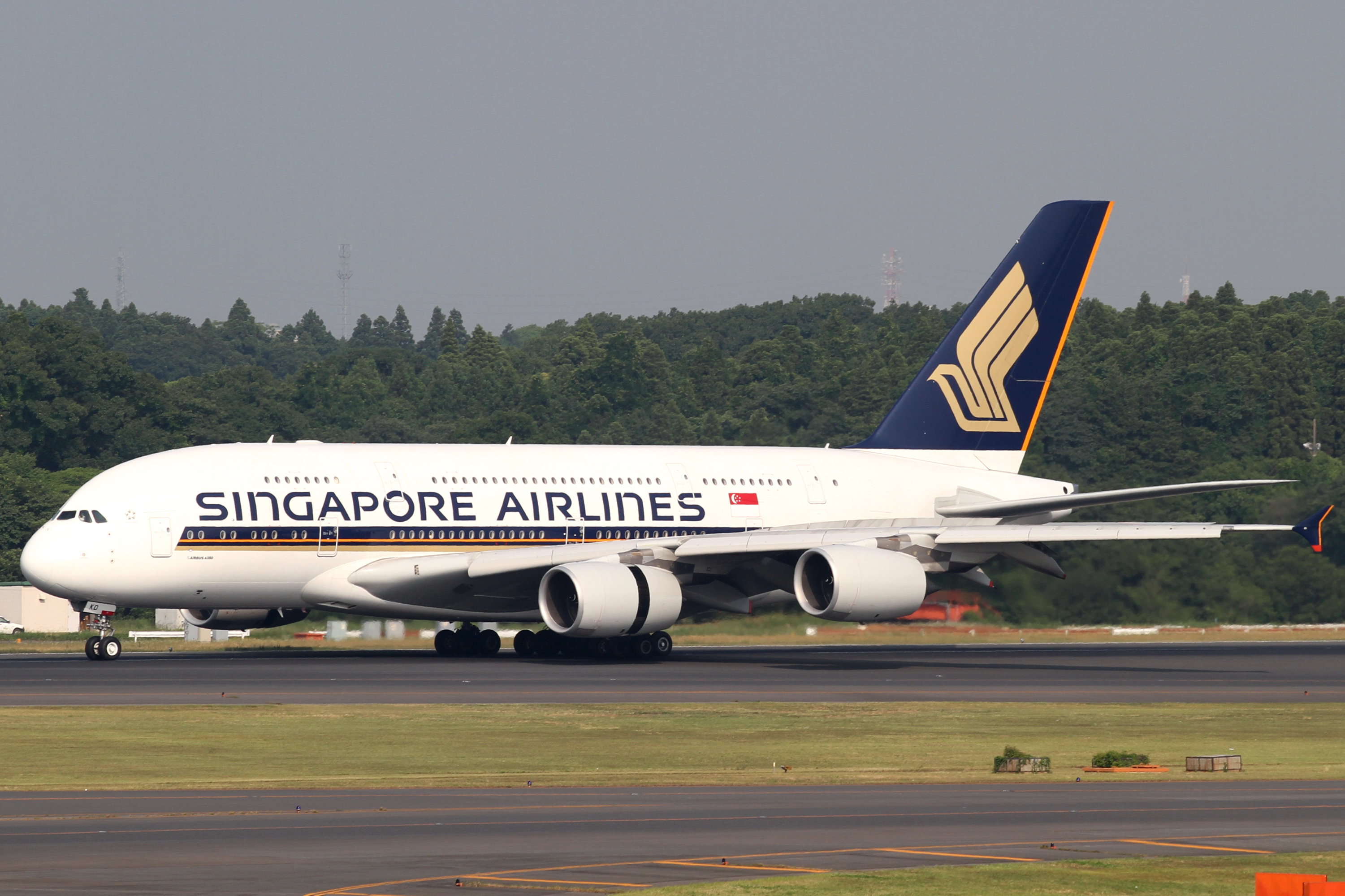
Singapore Airlines A380-800 (9V-SKD)

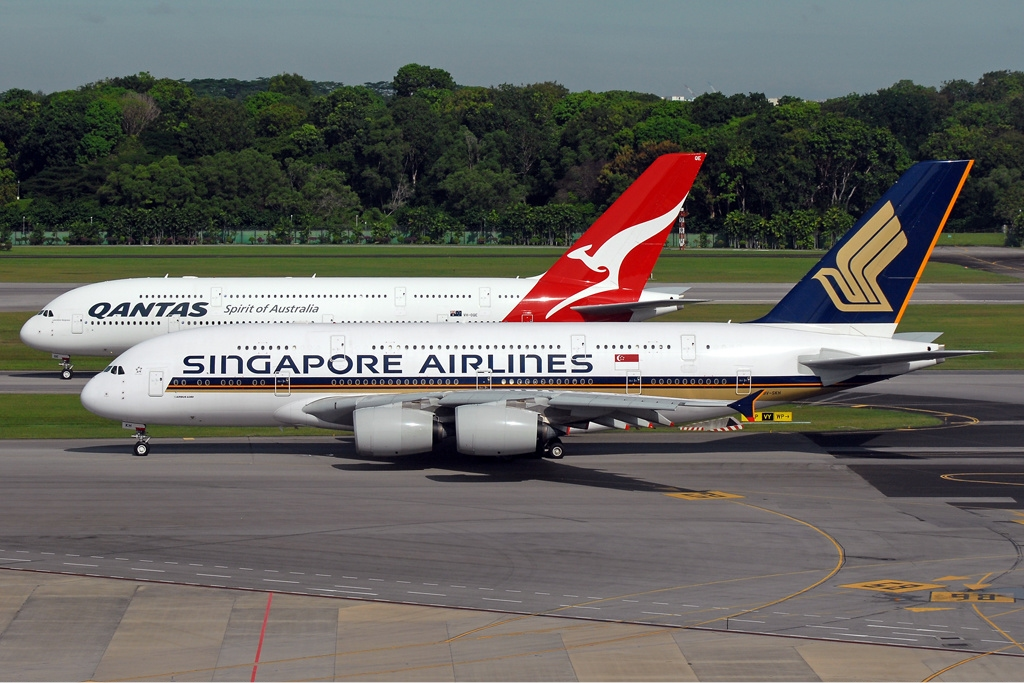
Qantas and Singapore Airlines A380s

With Changi-based Singapore Airlines being the launch customer for the Airbus A380, works to ensure full capability in handling the large aircraft were given priority in time for its introduction in October 2007. The Civil Aviation Authority of Singapore spent S$60 million in upgrading the two existing terminals and airport infrastructure, including enlarged gate hold rooms, new finger piers, and extended baggage belt carousels from the normal 70 to 90 m (230 to 300 ft). With these new carousels in place, the airport does not expect embarking and disembarking passengers and baggage from the A380 to take longer than it does from a Boeing 747-400, which carries fewer passengers. On 16 August 2005, Changi Airport unveiled the first of 11 specially built gates capable of handling the giant aircraft. Costing S$15 million, the gates or 'fingers' enable passengers to board the upper deck of the new 555-seater aircraft directly from the gate hold rooms. The hold rooms themselves have been enlarged and appointed to cater to the larger number of passengers aboard an A380. Beside the 11 new A380-capable gates at Terminals 1 and 2, eight more A380-capable gates were opened at Terminal 3 on 9 January 2008.

== Jewel Changi Airport ==
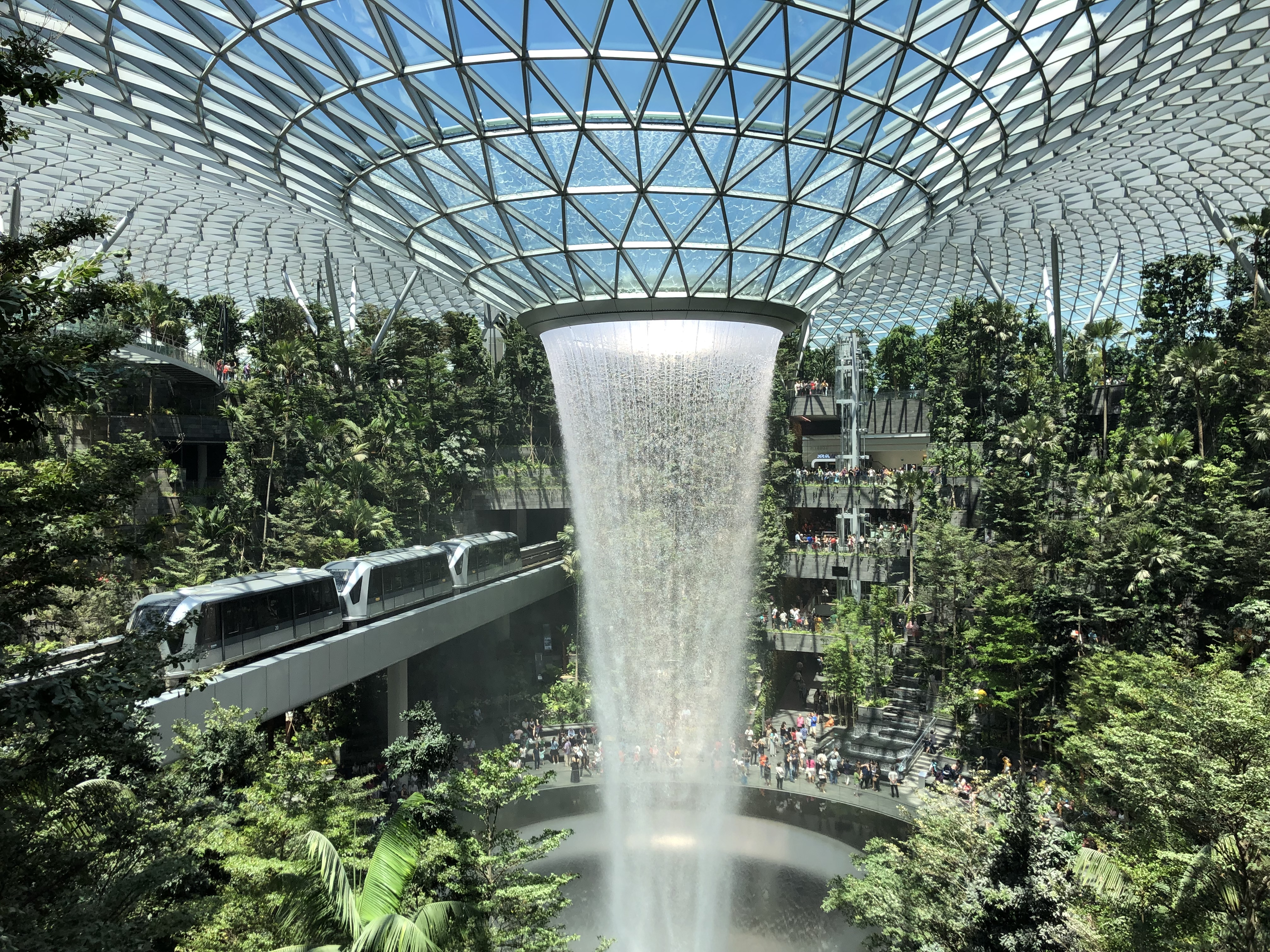
Jewel Changi

Announced in August 2013, Jewel is a new terminal structure that is intended as a mixed-use complex. It is situated on a 3.5-hectare site where the Terminal 1 car park used to reside. Jewel is a joint venture between Changi Airport (51%) and CapitaMalls Asia (49%). Essentially, a new multi-storey underground car park of about 2,500 car park spaces replace the existing facilities, while an indoor garden (with a waterfall) is built above. The new building sits between the three existing terminal buildings, enabling passengers to transfer via the new complex, whilst being an attraction and shopping destination in itself. The design consists of a circular structure, reminiscent of a doughnut, with a large garden and located at the centre is the HSBC Rain Vortex. There is also a hotel of about 130 rooms as part of the project.

As part of the project, Terminal 1 is expanded to allow more space for the arrival hall, baggage claim areas, and taxi bays. These enhancements increases T1's passenger handling capacity to 24 million passenger movements per annum by 2018. It opened on 17 April 2019.

== Passenger terminals ==
Changi Airport currently has four terminals, T1, T2, T3, and T4, with a total passenger annual handling capacity of 90 million. Terminals 1, 2, and 3 are directly connected via a people mover system, with airside passengers being able to freely move between the terminals without going through immigration. Transport within and between these three terminals is also provided by people movers and the skytrain system, although it is also possible to walk between the terminals on foot for airside visitors.

A former Budget Terminal, capable of handling 7 million passengers per year, was purpose-built for low-cost carriers. It was physically separated from the main terminals towards the south, where connections were possible via a free shuttle bus service to and from Terminal 2. Demolition began in 2013 to make way for a new and bigger Terminal 4.

Passenger infrastructure
Terminal	Opened	Floor area	Handling capacity	Parking bays
Terminal 1	1 July 1981; 45 years ago (operational); 29 December 1981; 44 years ago (official)	308,000 m^{2} (3,320,000 sq ft)	24 million passengers	29 (aerobridge); 16 (remote)
Terminal 2	22 November 1990; 35 years ago (operational); 1 June 1991; 35 years ago (official)	358,000 m^{2} (3,850,000 sq ft)	28 million passengers	35 (aerobridge); 11 (remote)
JetQuay (CIP Terminal)	15 August 2006; 20 years ago (operational); 29 September 2006; 20 years ago (official)	2,000 m^{2} (22,000 sq ft)	N/A	0
Terminal 3	9 January 2008; 18 years ago (operational); 25 July 2008; 18 years ago (official)	380,000 m^{2} (4,100,000 sq ft)	22 million passengers	28 (aerobridge); 15 (remote)
Terminal 4	31 October 2017; 9 years ago (operational); 3 August 2018; 8 years ago (official)	225,000 m^{2} (2,420,000 sq ft)	16 million passengers	21 (aerobridge); 8 (remote)
Terminal 5	14 April 2025; 19 months ago (groundbreaking) TBC (operational)	TBC	50 million passengers	49 (aerobridge) TBC (remote)
Jewel Changi Airport	17 April 2019; 7 years ago (operational); 18 October 2019; 7 years ago (official)	35,000 m^{2} (380,000 sq ft)	3 million passengers	
Total		1,308,000 m^{2} (14,080,000 sq ft)	90 million passengers	162 (aerobridge); 50 + TBC (remote)

Closed passenger infrastructure
Terminal	Opened	Closed	Floor area	Handling capacity	Parking bays
Former Budget Terminal	26 March 2006; 20 years ago (operational); 31 October 2006; 20 years ago (official)	25 September 2012; 14 years ago	28,200 m^{2} (304,000 sq ft)	7 million passengers	10 (contact)

=== Terminal 1 ===
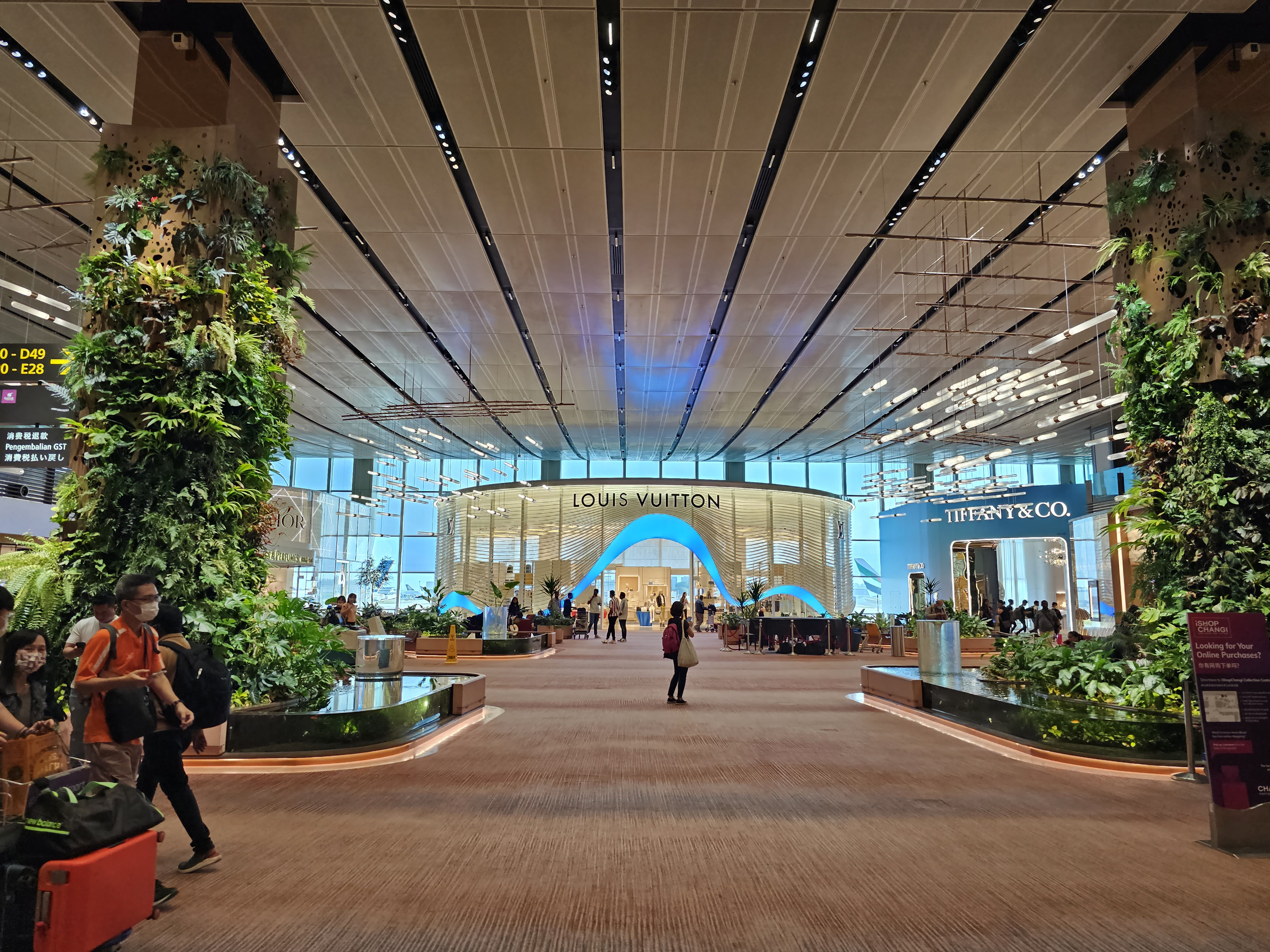
Terminal 1

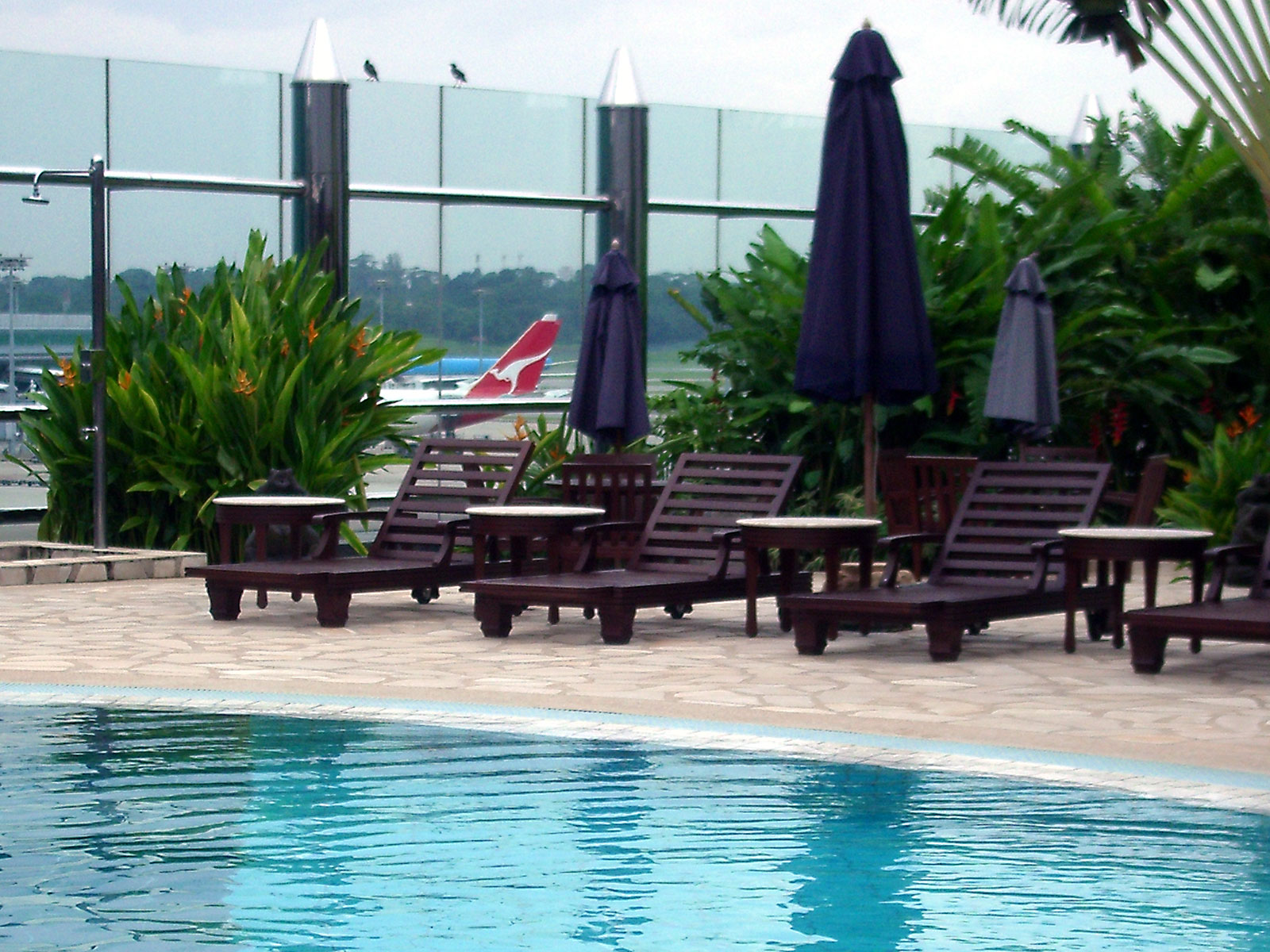
Swimming pool in the transit area of Terminal 1

Singapore Changi Airport's oldest terminal operated as the sole terminal from the stroke of midnight on 1 July 1981, right up until the opening of Terminal 2 nine years later. The first flight, Singapore Airlines SQ101 touched down that day at 07:10:00 Singapore Time with 140 passengers from Kuala Lumpur. Configured in an H-shaped layout to maximise the number of aerobridges that could be built, it underwent two major upgrading works over its lifespan. Takenaka Corporation served as the primary contractor.

A major refurbishment was completed in 1995 for S$170 million, and work to extend two finger piers to add 14 aerobridges at a cost of S$420 million that took place from 1996 to 1999. Today, the terminal spans an area of 308,000 m^{2} and can accommodate a maximum passenger capacity of 21 million passengers a year.

On 7 March 2012, Minister of State for Transport Josephine Teo said that the open-air car park between Terminal 1 and Changi's iconic control tower will be redeveloped into a multi-use complex. This new complex will be integrated with the existing building, and will increase Terminal 1's public areas, pick-up driveways, and car park spaces. With this expansion, Terminal 1's handling capacity will increase from 21 to 24 million passengers per annum. The expansion of Terminal 1 will go together with Terminal 4.

As of 12 July 2012, a S$500 million facelift for Terminal 1 has been completed, completing the terminal's largest renovation to date, involving works on its facade and halls under a theme called "Tropical City". About 22,000 m^{2} have been added to the building, bringing the total floor space of T1 to about 308,000 m^{2}. The larger floor area provides for more spatial comfort, better passenger flow, additional facilities and expanded retail and F&B offerings. The refurbishment includes the installation of a two-part kinetic sculpture, Kinetic Rain, which was billed as the largest kinetic sculpture in the world.

As of September 2019, another S$323 million upgrade of Terminal 1 was completed, comes mainly from the addition of more self-service check-in kiosks as well as bag-drop machines that allow travellers to print their own luggage tags. In addition, the baggage claim floor area was almost doubled in size and T1's baggage handling system were fully automated, in line with the rest of the airport's terminals.

The Southwest Finger of Level 3 of Terminal 1 has the head office of Scoot.

=== Terminal 2 ===
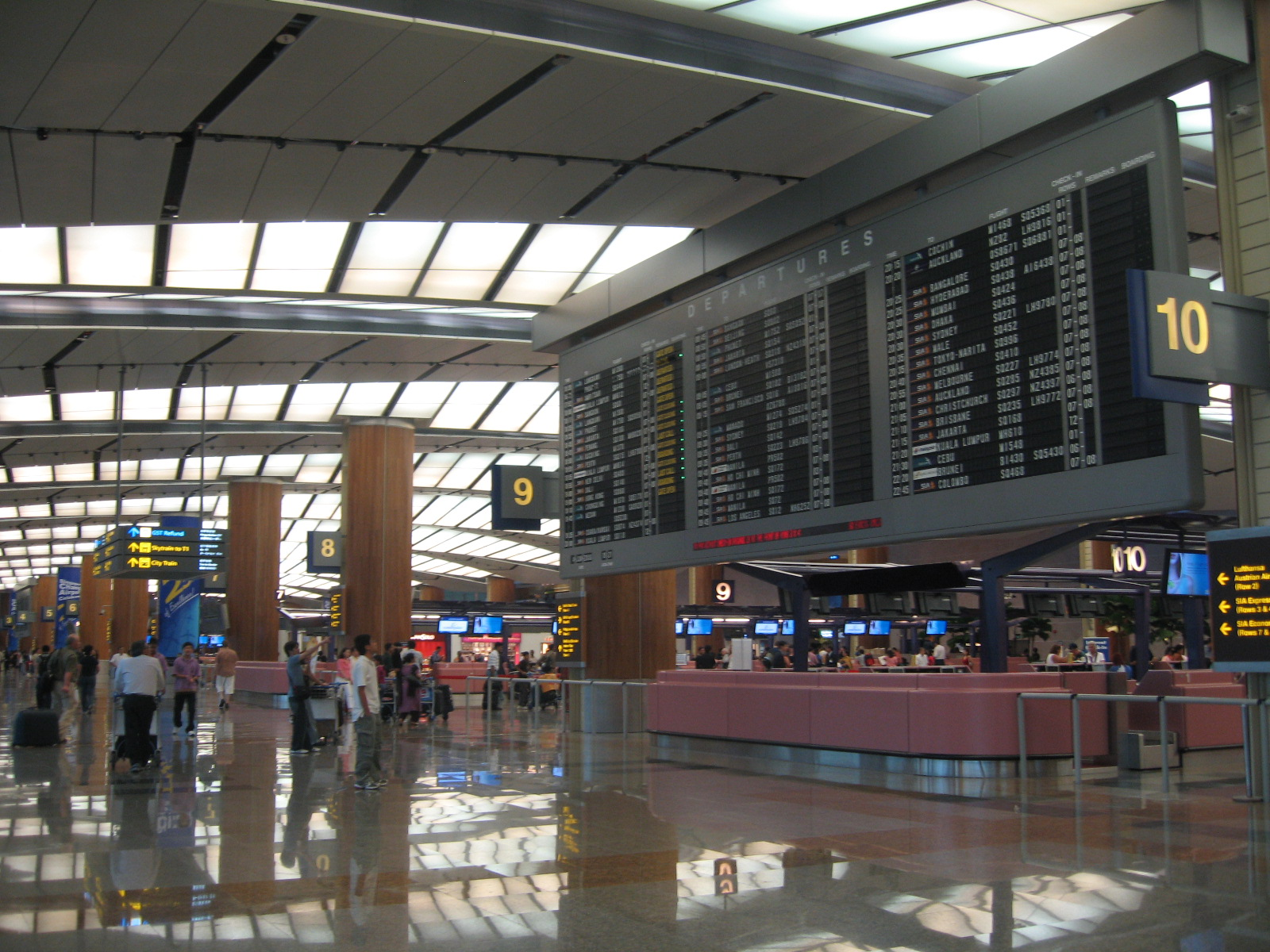
Old Terminal 2 departure hall

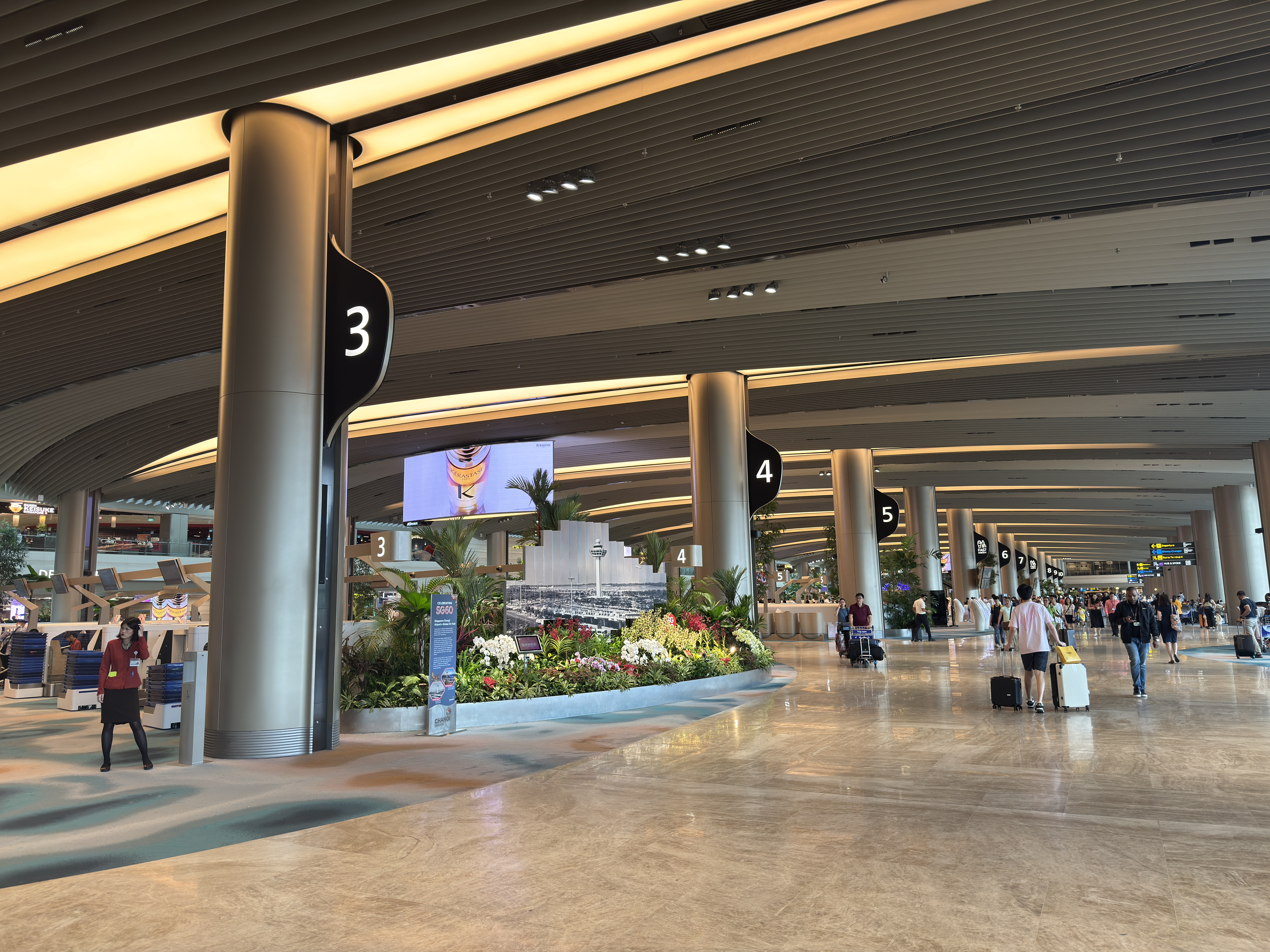
Current Terminal 2 departure hall taken in 2025

Terminal 2 opened on 22 November 1990 as part of phase 2 in the original airport masterplan. The official opening was attended by Prime Minister Goh Chok Tong on 1 June 1991. Deploying a linear configuration parallel to the runways, it is located adjacent to Terminal 1 towards the south, and heralded the opening of the original skytrain system linking the two terminals via the landside. All Singapore Airlines and SilkAir flights moved to the new terminal when it opened, along with several Southeast Asian carriers including Malaysia Airlines, Philippine Airlines, and Royal Brunei Airlines. They were joined by several airlines, some of which are allied to Singapore Airlines, in particular Lufthansa, both fellow Star Alliance members. Air France was a former user before moving back to Terminal 1. Other former users include Austrian Airlines, which ceased operations to Changi in October 2006. Etihad Airways was the latest airline to operate from Terminal 2 when it commenced flights in September 2007. All Nippon Airways moved to Terminal 2 from 1 October 2008. Airlines operating at the Budget Terminal, including Tigerair and Cebu Pacific, moved to Terminal 2 as the Budget Terminal closed for site redevelopment. Singapore Airlines' flights departing for Nepal, Maldives, Bangladesh, Sri Lanka, South Korea, Japan (with the exception of SQ 12 to Tokyo (Narita) as it continues on to Los Angeles), and Southeast Asia depart from this terminal. Other Singapore Airlines flights now operate from Terminal 3.

The fourth storey of the terminal houses the Civil Aviation Authority of Singapore. In addition Terminal 2 houses the offices of the Air Accident Investigation Bureau of Singapore and Changi Airport Group.

On 15 July 2013, the Airport unveiled its latest themed garden that has a display of colours and interactive technology – a first for Changi Airport, which has pioneered the concept of airport gardens since its opening in 1981. The new 'Enchanted Garden' – Changi Airport's fifth themed garden – takes pride in the spot where the Fern Garden once stood. It is open, free of charge, to passengers round-the-clock. Motion sensors trigger sounds of nature and blooming flowers while fibre-optic and LED lighting, embedded in the flooring, form a fascinating carpet of sparkling lights. There is also a pond containing Archerfish and Koi.

On 16 January 2020, upgrading works were announced for Terminal 2. They will include more nature-inspired design (which replaces the Orchid Garden), 15,500 sq m more space, two more baggage belts, more automated immigration counters and automated machines, along with a fully automated early baggage storage system. A new duplex food and beverage area will be set up at the north end of the terminal that leads to Jewel Changi Airport, along with a new food cluster at the south end. New lounge areas will be set up in the arrival hall. The works will be completed by 2024, resulting in an increased handling capacity of five million passengers a year, being 90 million in total. Two iconic flight information display flip boards (known as Solari boards) will be retired. The McDonald's and Starbucks outlets were shut on 31 January and April, respectively.

On 6 April 2020, it was announced in Parliament that Terminal 2 will be suspended from 7 April 2020, due to the temporary collapse of air passenger demand resulting from border closures and additional travel requirements caused by the COVID-19 pandemic. The suspension of Terminal 2 also enabled the Changi Airport Terminal 2 expansion and upgrading works to be accelerated.

On 29 May 2022, after a two-year hiatus, Terminal 2 began to reopen progressively in stages. Initially, in the first phase of the reopening, key touchpoints such as arrival immigration, baggage claim belts, and contact gates at the southern wing of the terminal were ready for flight operations, to cater mainly towards the peak-hour arrival flights of airlines that operate within Terminal 3. A small number of boarding gates at Terminal 2 were used by departure flights that originate from Terminal 3; the passengers on these flights were still required to check in and clear departure immigration at Terminal 3 before boarding.

On 1 November 2023, Terminal 2 reopened after three and a half years of extensive upgrade work. The upgrading and expansion works were completed months ahead of schedule. The upgraded terminal added more than 21,000 square meters and it was equipped with more automation. The upgrades also expanded dining, retail, and recreational options for airport users or visitors. The expansion and upgrades enable Terminal 2 to handle increasing passenger loads in the projected future as passenger volumes are expected to fully recover to pre-COVID levels in 2024. A section of the iconic analogue flip board showing departures has been displayed at the National Museum of Singapore as part of a transport history exhibition.

=== Former Budget Terminal ===
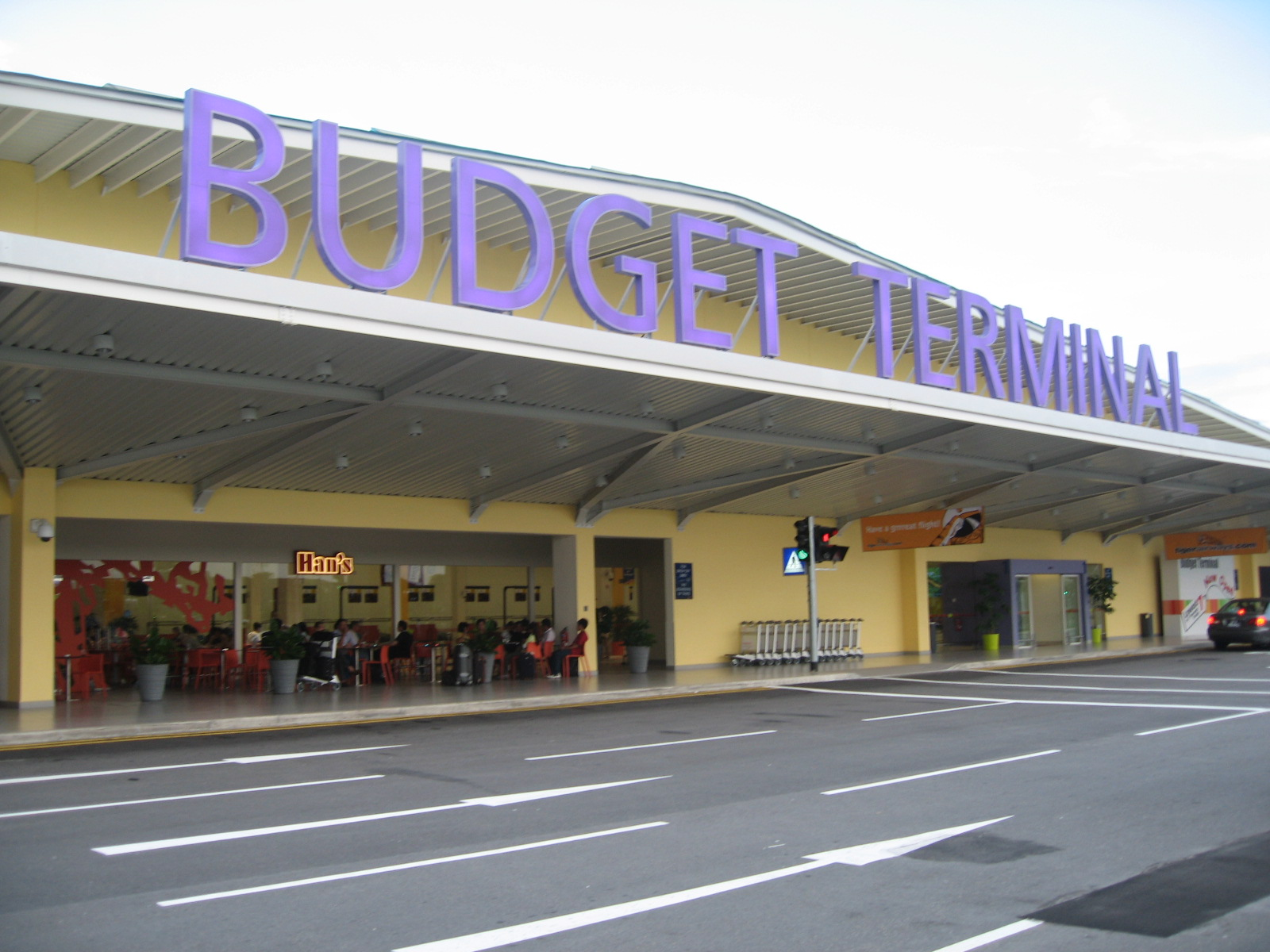
The Budget Terminal in June 2006

Changi Airport was the second in Asia (after Kuala Lumpur International Airport) to open a dedicated terminal catering to the budget traveller. The name of the Budget Terminal was decided as a result of a naming contest open to the public. However, the terminal is not included in the numbering scheme, even though it is the third passenger terminal to be opened when it opened on 26 March 2006, and Terminal 3 is actually the fourth terminal to be opened at the airport.

To offer lower landing fees, handling fees, and airport taxes, it cuts back on amenities such as aerobridges, elaborate physical structures, and decorations in the passenger terminal building. There is no transfer facility at the Budget Terminal.

In September 2008, expansion works costing $10 million began and took seven months to complete. The terminal was then able to handle seven million passengers a year, up from originally 2.7 million. There are more boarding gates, check-in counters, shops, and dining options. In addition, air-conditioning has been installed for arriving passengers.

On 2 March 2012, it was announced that the Budget Terminal would be closed on 25 September 2012 and demolished to make way for Terminal 4. All airlines previously operating from the Budget Terminal moved to Terminal 2, after the last flight departed Budget Terminal at 2 am on 25 September.

=== JetQuay CIP Terminal ===
JetQuay CIP Terminal is a privately run terminal, located in between T2 and the VIP terminal. JetQuay provides private check-in, baggage handling, and immigration clearance services. It is the second luxury airport terminal in the world to open after the Lufthansa First Class Terminal in Frankfurt Airport. However, unlike the Lufthansa First Class Terminal, JetQuay is an elite, dedicated CIP (Commercially Important People) terminal that can be used by any passenger travelling in any class, on any airline, through any terminal (T1, T2, T3, or T4).

=== Terminal 3 ===
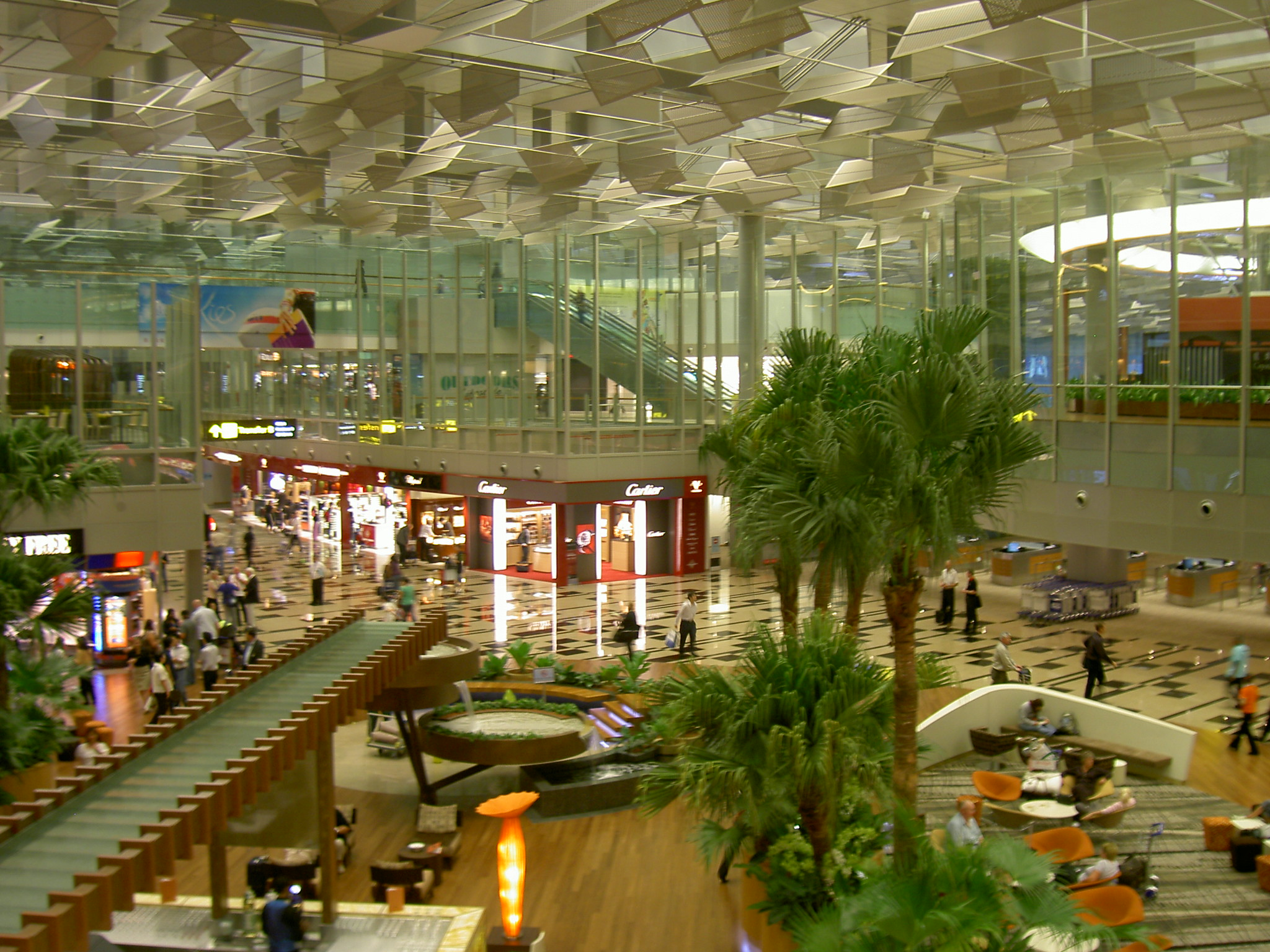
Transit area of Terminal 3

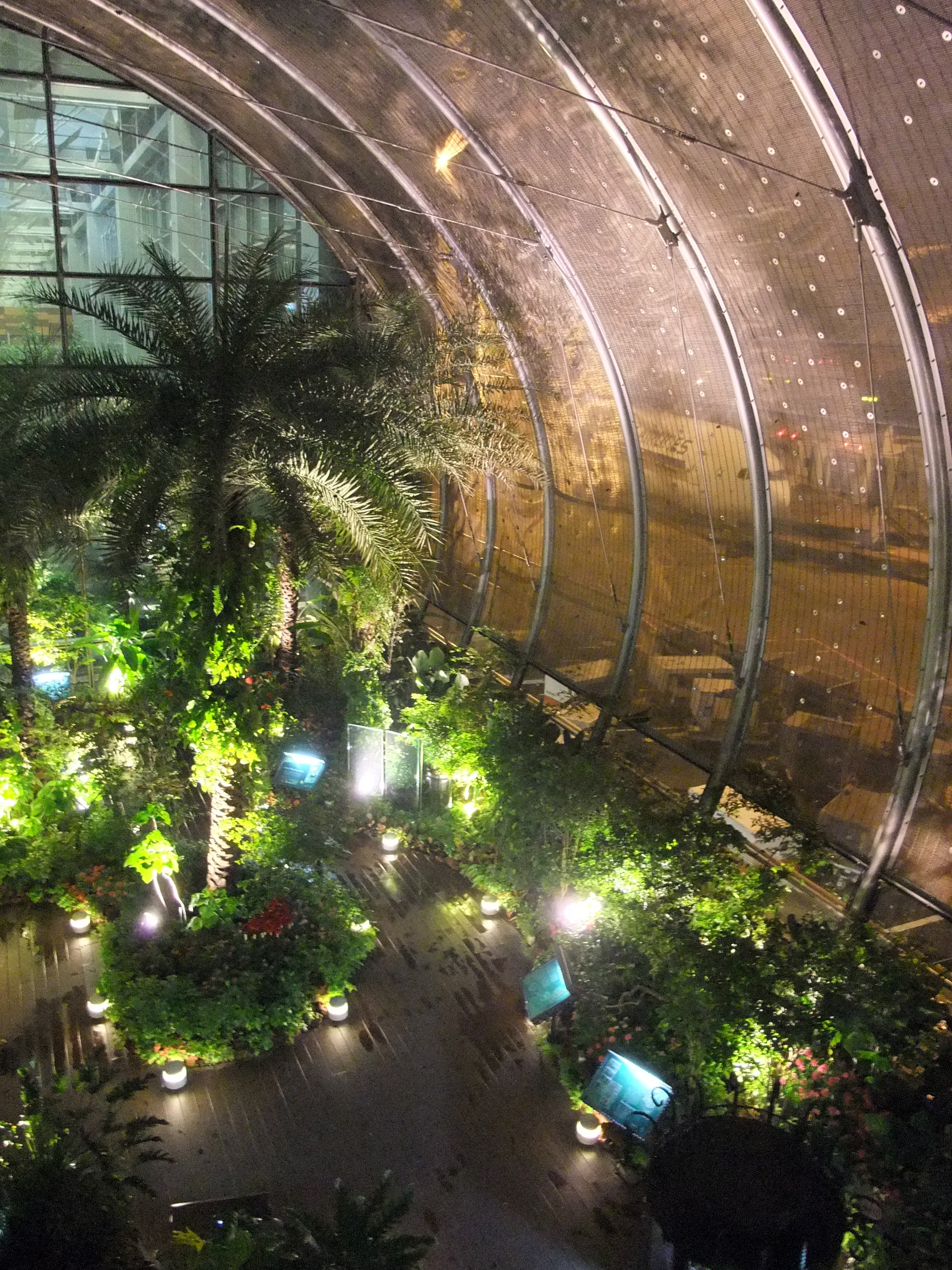
The Butterfly Garden in Terminal 3

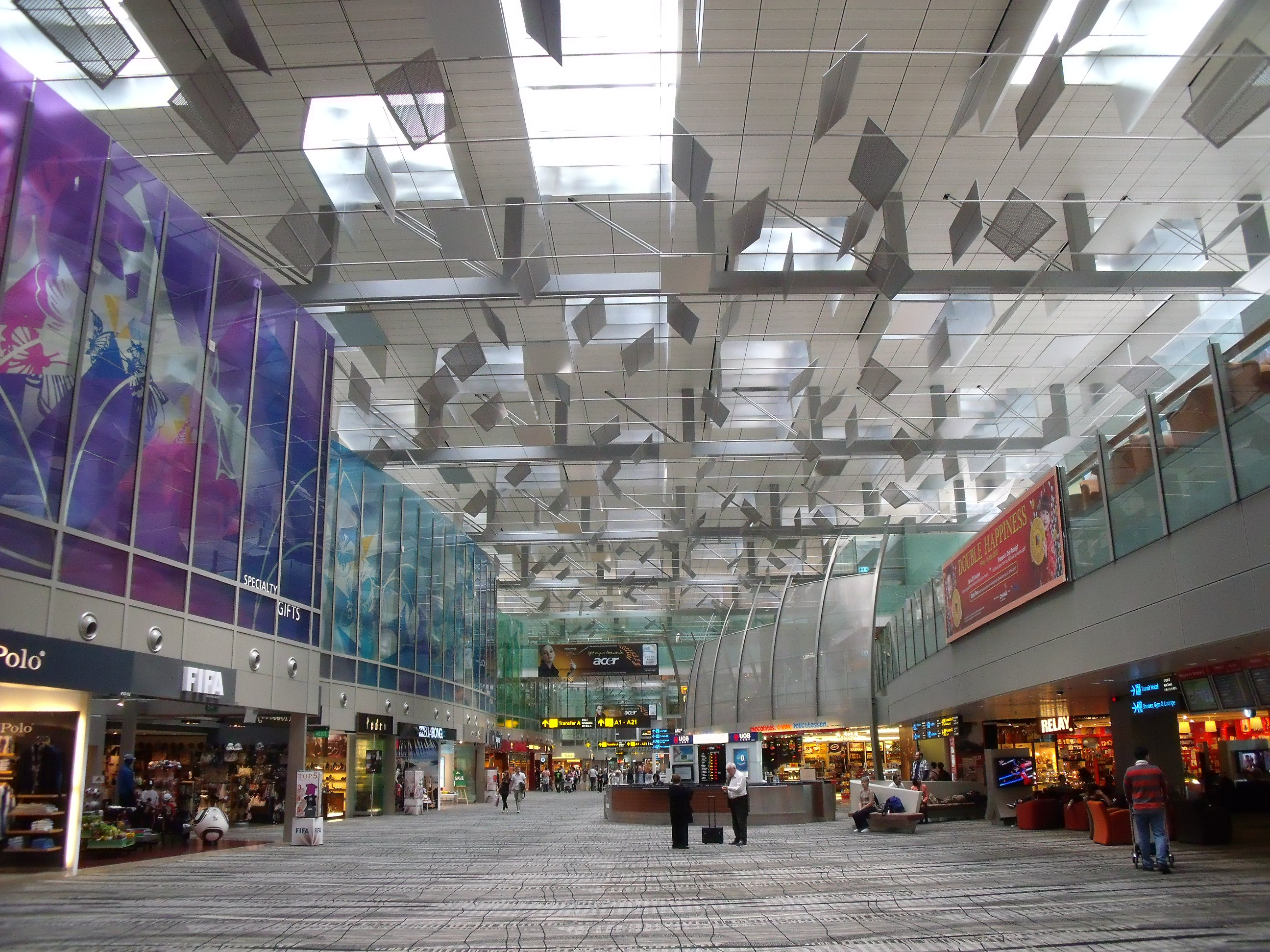
Shops along the transit area in Terminal 3

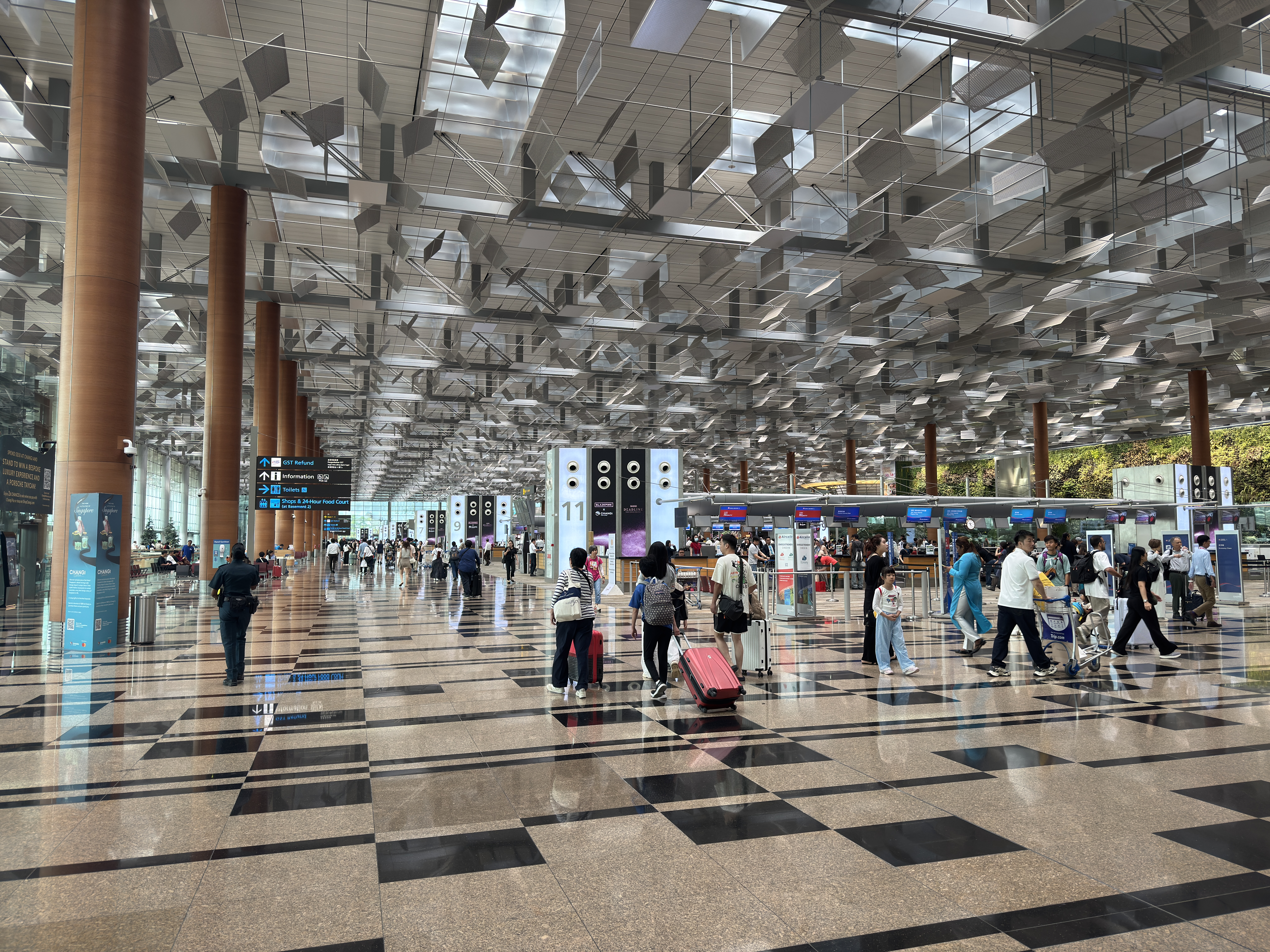
Terminal 3

Terminal 3, the airport's fourth passenger terminal, became operational on 9 January 2008, increasing the airport's annual passenger capacity by 22 million. The test flight out of Terminal 3 was a Singapore Airlines flight from Singapore to Perth. The flight departed T3 at 5:30 pm local time, landing in Perth International Airport at approximately 11:30 pm. The terminal has 28 aerobridge gates, with eight capable of handling the Airbus A380.

The interior architecture, designed by CPG Consultants, in collaboration with Woodhead, Tierra Design and SOM, Bartenbach LichtLabor and Hugh Dutton & Associates, of Terminal 3 won the Honour Award from American Society of Landscape Architects in 2009.

Singapore Airlines operated the first flights into Terminal 3 on 9 January 2008, with flight SQ001 from San Francisco via Hong Kong arriving at 1150 hours to a welcome ceremony by Minister for Transport and Second Minister for Foreign Affairs, Lim Siang Keat Raymond, and the chairman of CAG, Liew Mun Leong. The first departure flight, SQ318, took off at 1250 hours bound for London-Heathrow.

Since then, its regional flights to East Asia and India and long–haul flights bound for Australasia, Middle East, North America, South Africa and Western Europe will depart from T3 while other regional flights to Bangladesh, Southeast Asia and Sri Lanka depart from T2, becoming the first and only airline to operate from multiple terminals in Changi Airport. Singapore Airlines flights may arrive at Terminals 1, 2 or 3. However, all Singapore Airlines flights to Maldives, Nepal, Japan (with the exception of SQ 12 to Tokyo (Narita) as it continues on to Los Angeles) and South Korea depart from Terminal 2, as of 2024.

China Eastern Airlines, Jet Airways, Qatar Airways (moved back to Terminal 1 on 28 October 2018) and United Airlines also moved operations to the terminal on 1 January 2008, while Kingfisher Airlines launched services to Singapore using T3 in 2009. Garuda Indonesia, Saudi Arabian Airlines, Vietnam Airlines (moved to Terminal 4 on 7 November 2017) and SriLankan Airlines have also moved operations to T3 in 2011. In 2013, Asiana Airlines and Lion Air have also moved operations to T3. Ethiopian Airlines and Spring Airlines used to operate from Terminal 3. On 2 July 2015, China Airlines and EVA Air shifted their operations to T3.

United Airlines moved its operations from Terminal 3 to Terminal 2 on 24 May 2016, followed by Vietnam Airlines to Terminal 4 on 7 November 2017 and Qatar Airways to Terminal 1 on 28 October 2018. Vistara commenced regular service to Singapore using Terminal 3 on 6 August 2019 as part of its partnership with Singapore Airlines.

During the COVID-19 pandemic Singapore Airlines consolidated all of its flights to Terminal 3 from 1 May 2020 until 2023 citing low travel demand and accelerating Terminal 2 renovations.

On 31 May 2022, Singapore Airlines fully reopened its SilverKris and KrisFlyer Gold lounges at Changi Airport Terminal 3, after a $50 million upgrading project that began in 2019. The upgraded lounges (The Private Room, the First Class section of the SilverKris Lounge, the Business Class section of the SilverKris Lounge, and the KrisFlyer Gold Lounge) collectively accommodate around 1,150 customers – a 30 per cent increase from previous capacities. The lounges occupy a total area of 6,100 sq m, being slightly smaller than the size of a football pitch. The lounges feature dedicated rooms for passengers to nap, more charging ports, and more seats, among other improvements such as bars and a range of food options, including local food such as laksa, chwee kueh and dim sum.

=== Terminal 4 ===
Departure hall of Terminal 4

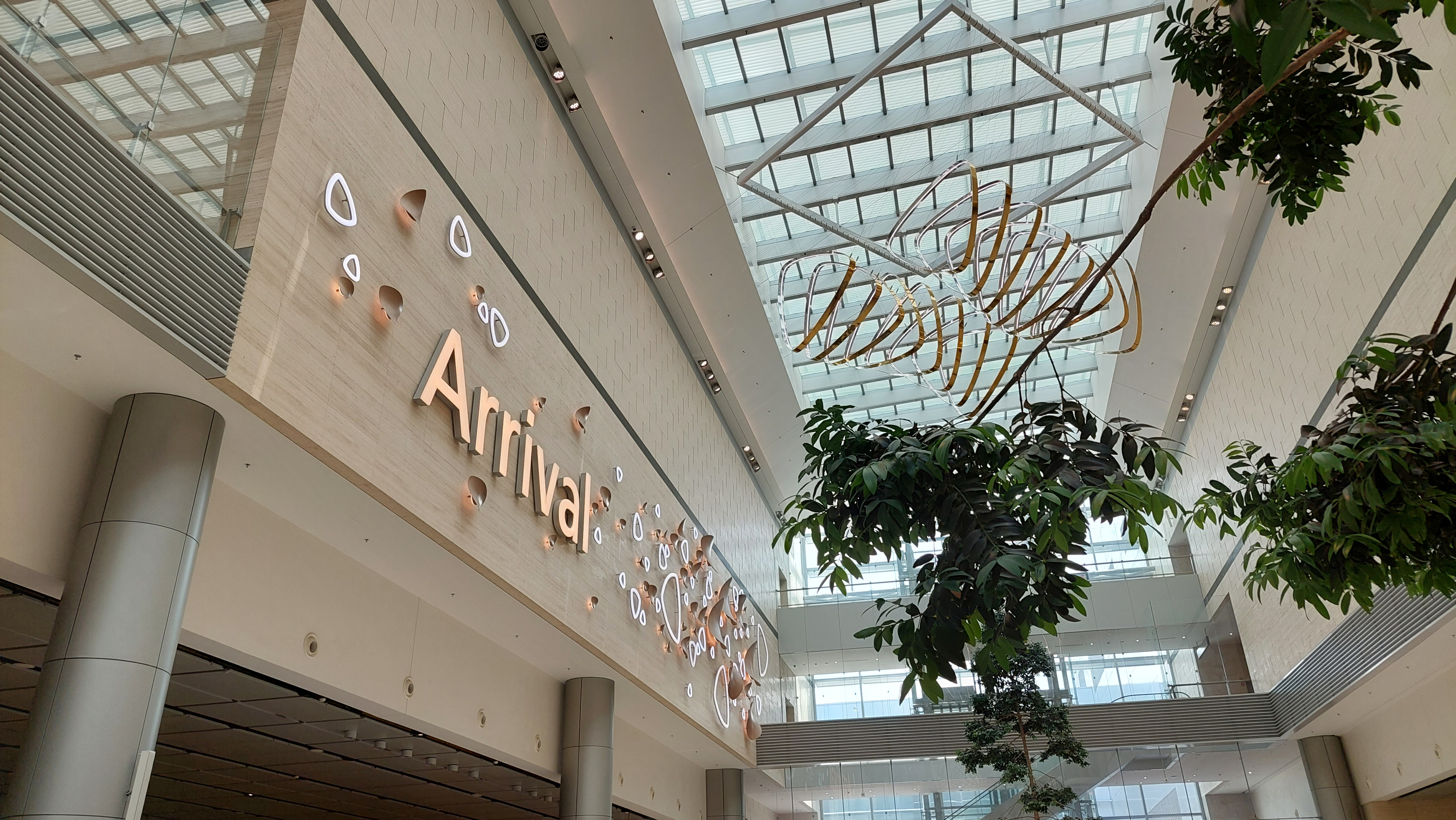
Arrival area

Singapore Changi Airport Terminal 4 is the fifth passenger terminal at Singapore Changi Airport and opened on 31 October 2017. It sits on the former Singapore Changi Airport Budget Terminal and cost S$985 million and took about two years to construct. The terminal building was designed and executed primarily by Takenaka Corporation, which has constructed and renovated many buildings at Changi Airport. It has won numerous awards, including a special one from Prix Versailles Architectural Award for South Asia.

The construction of the new Terminal 4 commenced in early 2014 and was completed on 16 December 2016. It officially opened on 31 October 2017. Under a new concept of "Fast And Seamless Travel at Changi" (FAST@Changi), it will see options such as self-service check-in, automated bag drop, immigration clearance, and boarding being rolled out extensively in the new building. Terminal 4 is a two-storey, 25-metre-high building with a gross floor area of 225,000 square metres. 17 stands are available for narrow-body aircraft, four stands for wide-body aircraft. A bridge across Airport Boulevard was constructed to enable buses and other airside vehicles to move from T4 to the aircraft stands. A new dedicated 68-metre-high ramp control tower was also built to "enhance air traffic controllers' management of aircraft movements in the apron and taxiways around the terminal". It is connected to the other terminals by complimentary shuttle bus services.

Local cultural and heritage items are used to decorate the terminal's interior. The retail space at the 'Heritage Zone' will feature traditional Peranakan shop front facades. Changi Airport Group (CAG) has given out all its 80+ concession contracts to various retail and food and beverage outlets including but not limited to Charles & Keith, Coach & Furla, Gassan Watches, Michael Kors, London Fat Duck, Old Street Bak Kut Teh and Sushi Goshin by Akashi. The Petalclouds are another key feature in Terminal 4 involving 6 separate features hanging from the room and with 16 moving parts.

Concurrent with the development of Terminal 4, major airfield works were undertaken to increase the number of aircraft parking stands to support the needs of all airlines operating at Changi. A 38-hectare land plot south of Terminal 3, housing the airport nursery as well as a reservoir, was converted into an aircraft parking area to house 17 narrow-body and nine wide-body aircraft stands. An overhead vehicular bridge across Airport Boulevard was also constructed to enable buses and other airside vehicles to move from T4 to these aircraft stands.

There are a total of 21 contact gates and 8 bus gates in Terminal 4, numbered Gates G1 to G21 and Gates H1 to H8. Gates G1 to G17 can only be used by single-aisle aircraft such as the Airbus A320 & Boeing 737, while Gates G18 to G21 can be used by both single-aisle & wide-bodied aircraft. Single-aisle aircraft can also utilise the Multiple Aircraft Receiving Stands (MARS) at Gates G18 to G21, which are designated as Gates G18L to G21R. Bus Gates H1 to H8 are located on the ground floor in an annex next to the Heritage Zone and serve planes that are parked at remote stands.

Cathay Pacific and Korean Air were the first two airlines to move to T4 on 31 October 2017. They were followed by Cebu Pacific and Spring Airlines on 2 November 2017, together with the AirAsia Group and Vietnam Airlines on 7 November 2017. On 6 March 2018, VietJet Air moved its operations from T3 to T4. In view of the effects of the COVID-19 pandemic, Cathay Pacific temporarily shifted its operations back to Terminal 1. Vietnam Airlines transferred its flight operations from Terminal 4 back to Terminal 3 from 26 September 2023.

New airlines to Changi Airport included JC International Airlines and Lanmei Airlines, which began operations out of T4 from 25 January 2018 and 22 April 2018, respectively. Both airlines have since ceased their services to Singapore. GX Airlines and Juneyao Airlines commenced Singapore operations on 12 December 2018 and 1 February 2019 respectively. On 15 May 2018, West Air moved its operations from T1 to T4. On 28 October 2018, Regent Airways moved its operations from T1 to T4. On 30 November 2018, Hainan Airlines resumed operations to Singapore.

Operations at Terminal 4 were suspended from 16 May 2020 to September 2022, due to the collapse in air passenger demand caused by the COVID-19 pandemic.

=== Terminal 5 ===
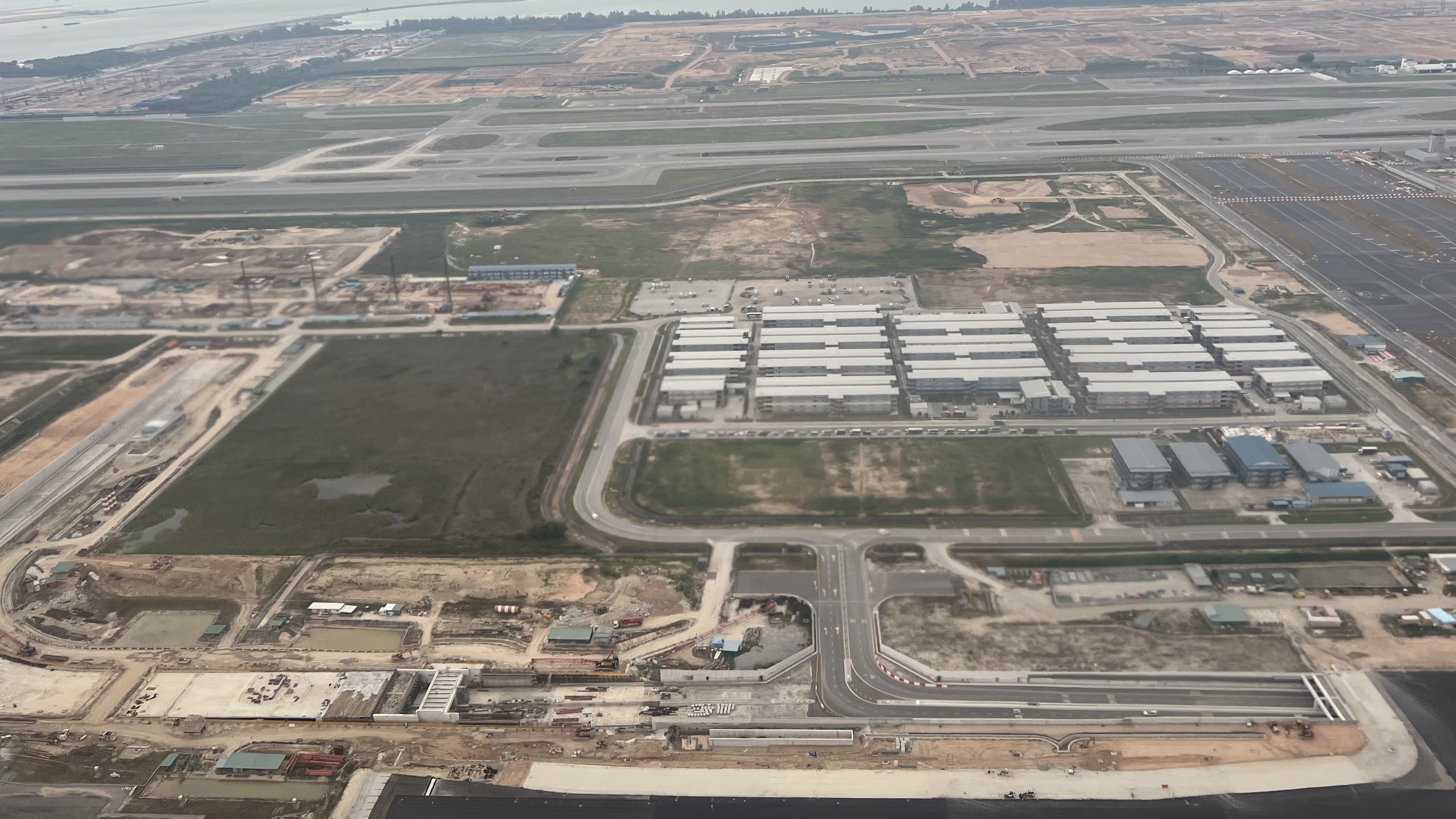
Construction of Terminal 5 in February 2024

A fifth terminal, Terminal 5, will be ready in the next decade as announced by the then Transport Minister, Lui Tuck Yew on 7 May 2013. Terminal 5 will be built on 1,080 hectares of reclaimed land in Changi East, making it one of the largest terminals in the world, scheduled for completion in the 2030s and costing around US$10bn. The terminal could handle a capacity of 50 million passengers annually in the first phase and another 20 million in the second phase.

With the addition of the fifth terminal, Changi Airport will be able to cater to more than 153 million passengers every year. With the national carrier (Singapore Airlines and Scoot) at Terminal 5, each alliance of airlines such as SkyTeam and Oneworld could also operate out of dedicated terminals. Terminal 5 is also expected to have more self-service facilities and bigger lounges. Terminal 5 will be linked to the other terminals at Changi Airport. This will allow the expanded Changi Airport to be operated as a single, integrated airport for ease of transfer between different terminals, maximum passenger convenience, and airfield operational efficiency. For example, some 18 kilometres of tunnels will be built to allow airside connections for baggage, passengers and vehicles between terminals as well as the current four terminals.

In order to create a contiguous and integrated airfield, the former Changi Coast Road and the park connector beside it were replaced with a new at-grade road and park connector further east, along the eastern coastline, the present Tanah Merah Coast Road. The terminal will be connected by an extension to the Thomson–East Coast MRT line, which will also extend to the existing Changi Airport branch. Provisions will also be made on the Cross Island MRT line for a possible extension towards the airport. More details will be released after engineering studies are completed. The adequacy of bus services to the airport will also be reviewed. These plans will ensure that all airport users and staff can travel to the airport easily and conveniently.

Part of the newly increased airport levy will be used to fund the terminal and other projects.

On 5 March 2020, Transport Minister Khaw Boon Wan suggested that Terminal 5 was among the projects that could be delayed as a result of the COVID-19 pandemic, although it was still "manageable". On 16 June 2020, he added that the Changi Terminal 5 project was delayed by at least 2 years as a result of the pandemic and its impact on the aviation sector.

On 17 May 2022, at the Changi Aviation Summit, Transport Minister S Iswaran announced that Terminal 5 construction works were expected to commence in about 2–3 years. Mr Iswaran also said that Terminal 5 will be operational by the mid-2030s, to meet an anticipated doubling of volume by the 2040s. "We have taken the opportunity of the two-year hiatus to comprehensively review the T5 design to make it more modular and flexible, and enhance its resilience and sustainability. We will re-mobilise the design and engineering consultants progressively, to update and further refine the T5 design," he said. Later that year, on 21 August, then Prime Minister Lee Hsien Loong announced the full resumption of the construction of Terminal 5, and that it was also redesigned to make it more resilient to future pandemics and more environmentally friendly. There will also be a Changi East Urban District built close to Terminal 5 as a business and lifestyle hub.

On 6 September 2024, Prime Minister Lawrence Wong announced that construction of Terminal 5 will begin in the first half of 2025. Later on 18 February 2025, during Budget 2025, Wong announced an additional S$5bn that will go to funding the expansion of Changi Airport, including the construction of Terminal 5. In May 2025, two contracts worth S$4.5bn were awarded for the construction of Terminal 5. The groundbreaking ceremony was held on the 14th that same month, by which point the airport's third runway, a vehicular underpass, and passengers and baggage tunnels for the new terminal had been constructed. A contract worth S$999mil was awarded the following month for the construction of the underground tunnel system.

On 31 March 2026, a World War II 250kg bomb relic was uncovered during the construction of the terminal. A controlled disposal via detonation of the bomb was carried out on-site by the Singapore Armed Forces' Explosive Ordnance Disposal team in the early morning of 2 April.

== Services ==
Changi Airport has continuously ranked highly in terms of customer service and security and has won over 500 awards and accolades as best airport since its opening in 1981, including from organisations such as Skytrax and Business Traveller.

=== Passenger services ===
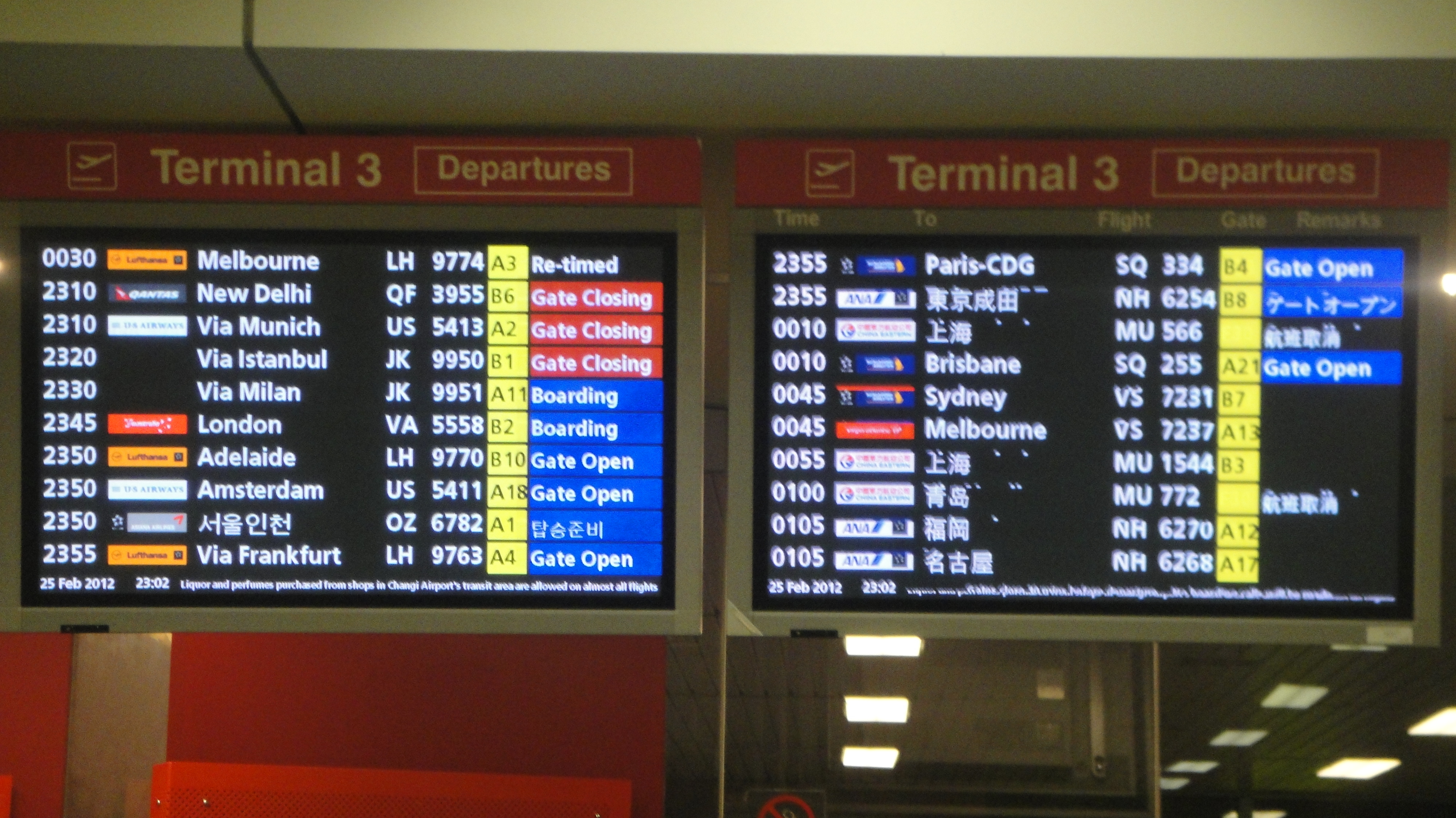
Flight information display system (FIDS) displays in the departure area of Changi Airport T3 driven by Intersystems RapidFIDS

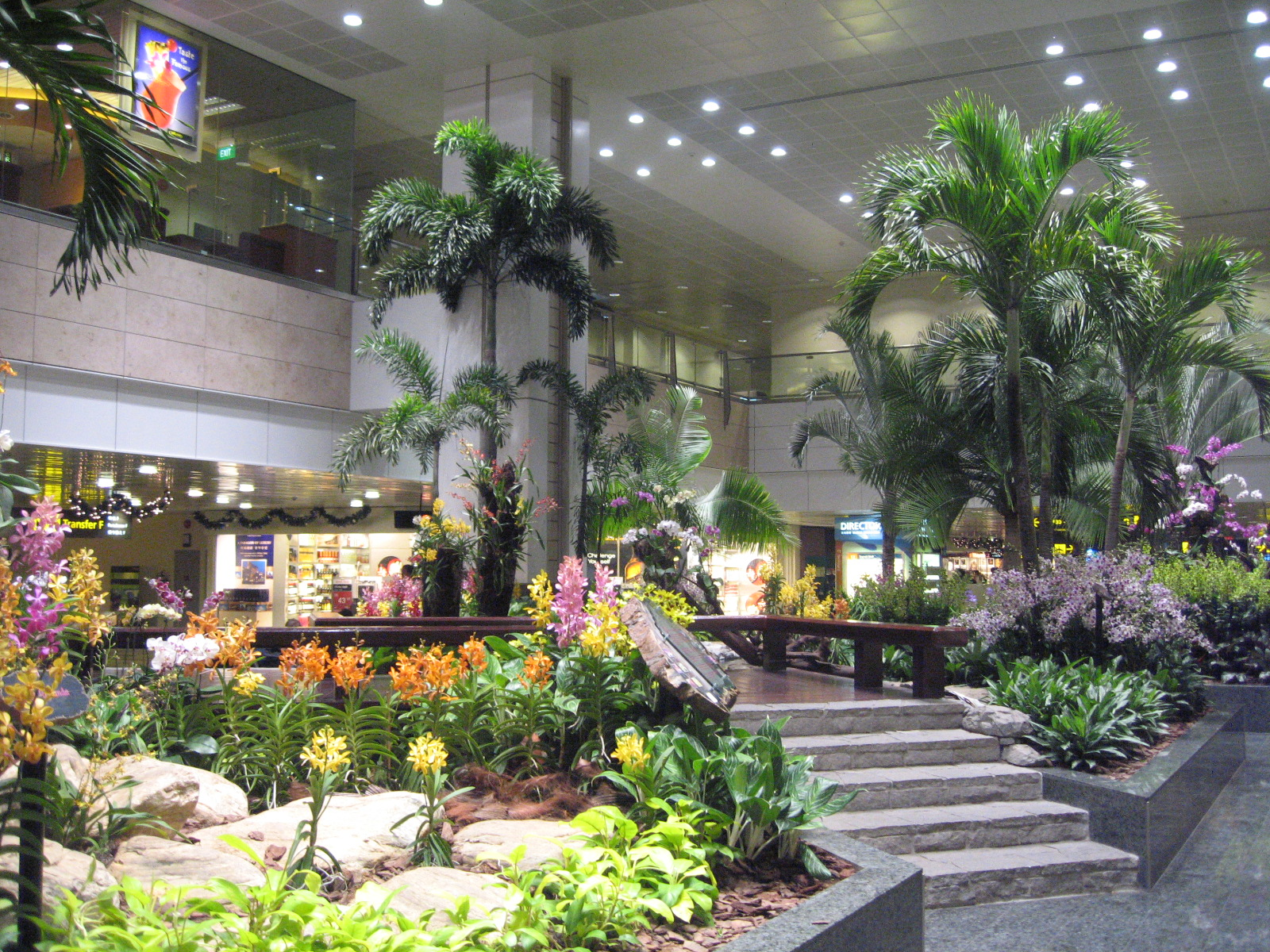
Extensive foliage in Terminal 2 provides relaxation for passengers in the transit area.

The airport has over 70,000 m^{2} (753,500 sq ft) of space spread between its three main terminals for shopping and eating outlets, with Terminal 3 having the largest amount of retail space at 20,000 m^{2} (215,300 sq ft).

From two different lounges with 24-hour napping areas, showers and spa facilities, to hotel and pool amenities, this airport also includes Singapore Tours (created for those in transit for more than 5 hours who are granted a special pass to leave the airport on one of two city tour options), Nature Trail (with six themed garden reserves) and comprehensive dining and entertainment options.

In terms of sales, the airport outstrips other shopping malls in Singapore, including those in top tourist spots such as Orchard Road. The Changi Airport Group derives 55% of its total annual revenue from non-aeronautical sources, such as office and warehouse rental. The airport derives the majority of its commercial revenue from duty-free shopping, with the most popular items being liquor and tobacco, perfume and cosmetics, and luxury goods.

In addition to a wide array of shopping and dining outlets, Changi Airport has ten garden areas spread across all four terminals that are all located in the transit areas. Changi Airport also has a curated collection of artworks by local and international artists across the public areas of the airport's terminals.

Gardens in Changi Airport
Terminal	Gardens
1	Cactus Garden; Piazza Garden; Sculptural Tree Garden; Water Lily Garden
2	Enchanted Garden; Orchid Garden; Sunflower Garden
3	Butterfly Garden; Crystal Garden
4	Steel in Bloom

Changi Airport has numerous business centres located around the airport. Within the international transit area of the interconnected Terminals 1,2 and 3, internet and games facilities, prayer rooms, showers, spas, gym, swimming pool and a hotel are provided. Various lounge areas are provided, some including children's play areas or televisions showing news, movie and sports channels. The Qantas Singapore Lounge draws on Qantas' flagship lounges in Sydney and Melbourne, including a live cooking station and communal dining areas designed by Hurley Palmer Flatt.

Passengers at Changi Airport will soon be able to board their flights faster, with the introduction of self-boarding gates. The Changi Airport Group (CAG) has been conducting trials of the self-boarding gates at a common gate hold room in Terminal 2 since May with Lufthansa. The self-boarding gates are just one component of a fast and seamless travel (FAST) initiative, which CAG will be rolling out across terminals at the airport. Since April 2014, the gates have been progressively introduced in common gate hold rooms in all three terminals.

The ongoing trial of a number of self-service functions – check-in, bag tagging, and bag drop – will run for about three months until August 2014. It will enable CAG to assess improvements and adjustments needed for the hardware and software of the various systems.

Two self-bag-drop units and four self-check-in kiosks have been fitted alongside the Jetstar check-in counters in Terminal 1. Passengers on selected Jetstar flights are invited to use these self-service options. At the self-check-in kiosk, passengers print their boarding pass as well as their baggage tag after checking in. After tagging their baggage, they can drop it off at the self-bag-drop counter. A receipt is provided for checked-in baggage. Instructional videos and signs are available to guide passengers, and on-ground staff is also present to provide assistance. Since the trial started in early May, about 1,000 passengers have used the FAST facilities.

=== Aviation services ===
==== Ground handling ====
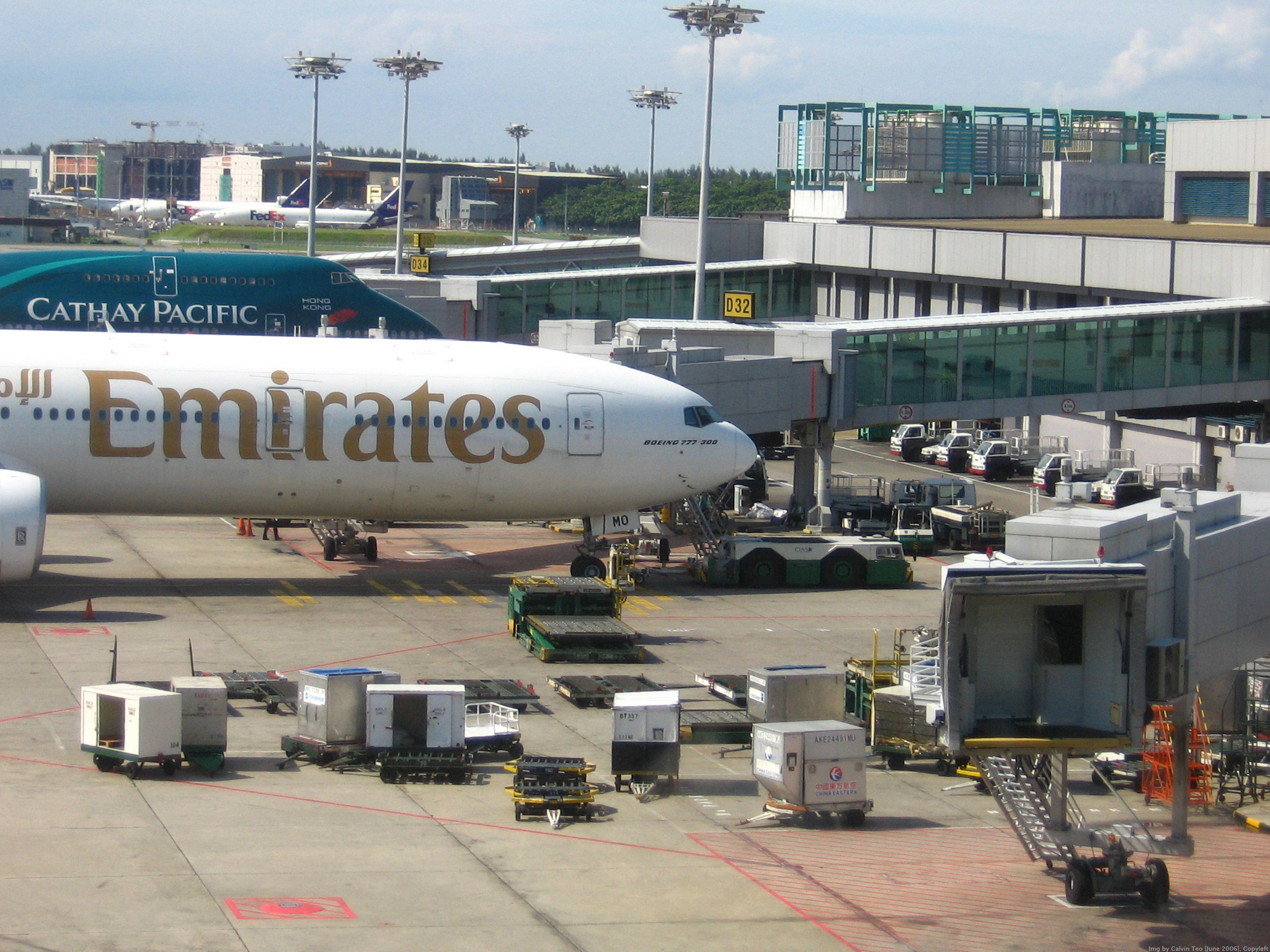
An Emirates Boeing 777-300 and Cathay Pacific Boeing 747-400 being serviced at Terminal 1

Ground handling services are handled by two companies: Singapore Airport Terminal Services (SATS) and Dnata. SATS is the dominant player with close to 70% of the market in the airport. Dnata Singapore, formerly Changi International Airport Services (CIAS), was formed in 1977 by the Port of Singapore Authority and five airlines (Air France, China Airlines, Garuda Indonesia, Koninklijke Luchtvaart Maatschappij N.V. (KLM; Royal Dutch Airlines) and Lufthansa). It handles the remaining market share.

In the early 2000s, the government decided to introduce competition into the market by offering an additional licence. Swissair's Swissport won the 10-year licence and commenced operations on 2 March 2005.

As Swissair folded and was subsequently taken over by Swiss International Air Lines, the latter became the company's first customer. Adam Air chose Swissport as its ground handler in 2005, while Tiger Airways followed suit in 2006. Other customers of Swissport include Swiss World Cargo, AirAsia, and Cardig Air. Former customers of Swissport include Australian Airlines. Swissport ceased operation on 31 March 2009 due to massive losses.

In 2009, a wholly owned subsidiary of SATS, Asia Pacific Star (APS) began operating. It concentrates mainly on budget carriers by providing point-to-point ground handling services such as passenger, ramp and baggage handling, and aircraft interior cleaning with short turnaround times. Some of the airlines APS handles include the AirAsia Group, Cebu Pacific, and Spring Airlines.

CIAS was bought over and restructured by Dubai's Dnata in 2004, being relaunched in August 2011 with a new branding. Its security services were amalgamated into the new Temasek-owned Aetos Security Management.

==== Aircraft maintenance ====
Six aircraft hangars capable of full aircraft maintenance, repair and overhaul are operated and managed by SIA Engineering Company at Changi Airfreight Centre, including Hangar 1, a 20,000 m^{2} (215,300 sq ft) column-free hangar which was the world's largest when opened in 1981. Another five aircraft hangars are operated by SASCO/ST Aerospace.
