= Kinetic Rain =

Moving sculpture at Singapore Changi Airport

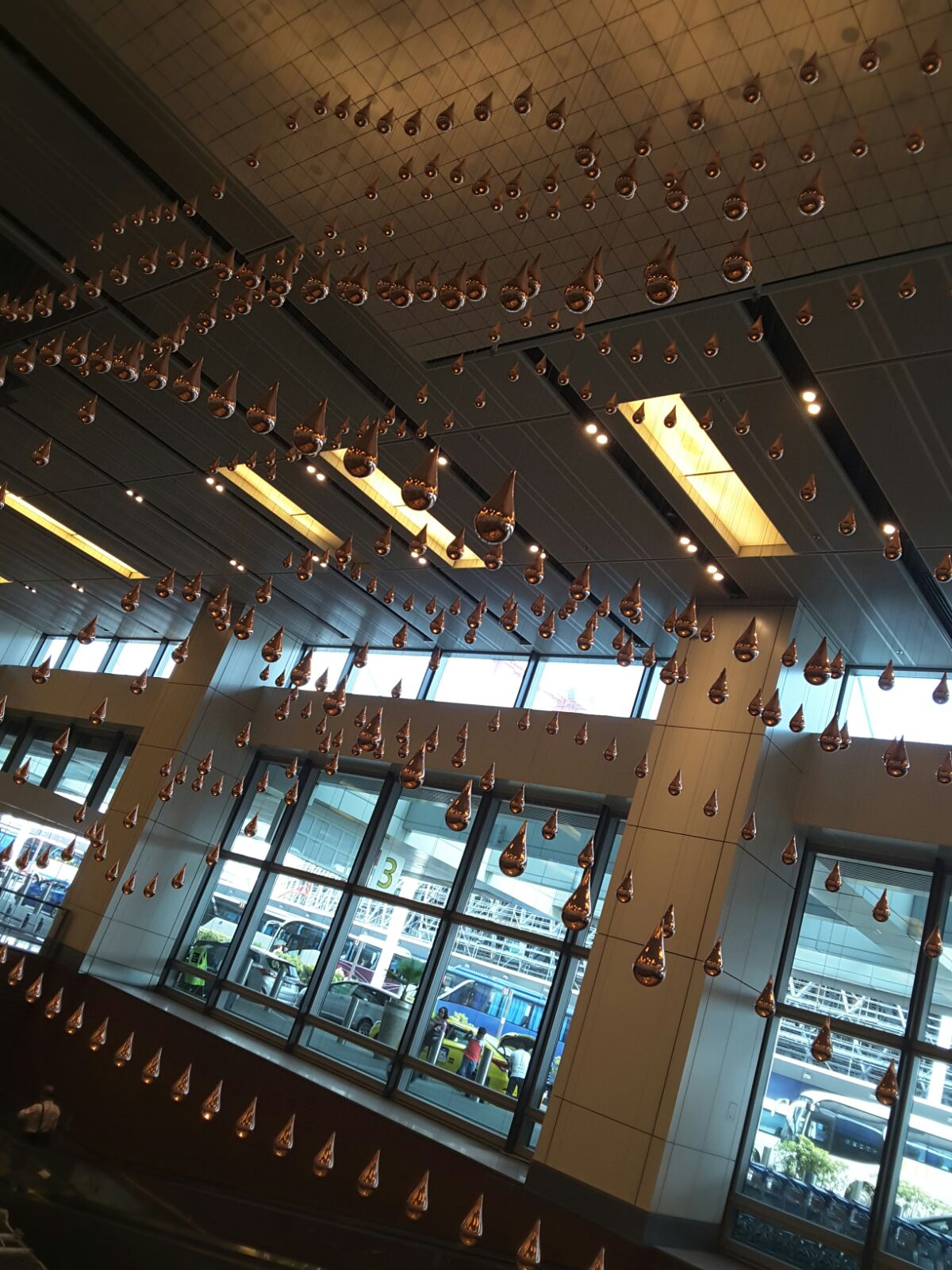
- A section of the Kinetic Rain sculpture.
- Designer: Art+Com
- Completion date: July 2012
- Medium: Copper-plated aluminum
- Subject: Moving raindrops
- Dimensions: 7.3 m (24 ft)
- Weight: 180 g (each)
- Location: Changi Airport, Singapore

Kinetic Rain is a moving sculpture at Singapore Changi Airport. It was installed in early July 2012 in the departure check-in hall of Terminal 1 as part of the terminal's refurbishment. Spanning an area of 75 square metres (810 sq ft) and a height of 7.3 metres (24 ft), it has been billed as the world's largest kinetic sculpture.

The installation consists of two separate segments, installed several meters apart. Each segment consists of 608 copper-plated aluminum raindrops, each weighing 180 grams (6.3 oz) and is suspended by a thin wire. Computer-controlled motors attached to the wires can move each raindrop up and down independently, thereby allowing the raindrops to form elaborate moving shapes. The installation is programmed to arrange the raindrops such that they create the contour of flight-related objects such as an airplane, kite or hot air balloon during a 15-minute loop.

Kinetic Rain was created over a period of two years by artists, animators and programmers from the German design firm Art+Com. Its cost has not been made public. According to Art+Com, the sculpture "aims to be a source of identity for its location, and provides a moment for passengers to contemplate and reflect".

== Intrusion and damage ==
On 2 November 2013, a woman climbed over a railing and perched on the netting below the sculpture, damaging the sculpture in the process. She was later arrested under the Mental Health Act.
