= Tierra Design =

Design studio in Singapore

Tierra Design is a design studio headquartered in Singapore. The firm's main focus is landscape architecture.

Its sister company, known as Tierra Design Studio, specialises in architecture and interior architecture.

== History ==
Tierra Design was founded by Martin Palleros (Argentina), Natalie Gunewardene (Sri Lanka) and was joined by Franklin Po in 1995. Po, the firm's principal registered architect and accredited landscape architect, has led the practice since 2001. Po holds a master's degree in Architecture from the University of California, Los Angeles and also a Bachelor in Biology from UC Irvine.

== Landscape architectural projects ==
Tierra has completed many landscape design projects around the world.

Completed in 2007, Changi Airport Terminal 3 interior landscape is one of the best known projects of Tierra, and has been featured in several architecture magazines. The green tapestry in this project is 14 meters high and 300 meters long. The project won an Honor Award from American Society of Landscape Architects (ASLA).

In 2008, Tierra Design planned the landscaping for Banyan Tree hotel in Lijiang China, a 900-year-old UNESCO World Heritage site.

At 158 Cecil Street, Singapore, in 2011, a seven-stories high indoor "green wall" vertical garden was designed. This work received several awards, including Skyrise Greenery Awards First Prize in 2011, and World Best Vertical Garden Design Gold Award in 2012.

== Awards ==
- BCA Construction Excellence Award 2013, Residential Buildings – 1,800 sqm and above, Livia Condominium, 2013
- FIABCI Prix d'Excellence Awards 2013 (International) – In partnership with Architects 61 Pte Ltd as the landscape designer – Silver Winner in the Residential High Rise Category, Soleil@Sinaran, 2013
- World Best Vertical Garden Design Gold Award, World Green Roof Congress (WGRC Hangzhou), 158 Cecil Street Singapore, 2012
- World Architecture Festival, Shortlisted for Landscape of the Year, 158 Cecil Street Singapore, 2012
- Skyrise Greenery Awards, First Prize, Hanging Garden in CBD – A Fusion of "Archi-Nature" at 158 Cecil Street Singapore, 2011
- ASLA Professional Awards, Honor Award, Changi Airport Terminal 3 Interior Landscape, 2009
- SILA Merit Award for Institutions Category, Greenwall @ Changi Airport Terminal 3, 2007
- SILA Silver Award for Parks, Open Spaces, Recreation Areas Category, Banyan Tree Resort, Lijiang China, 2007
- SILA Commendation for Institutions Category, Mandai Crematorium & Columbarium Complex, 2005
- RIBA Worldwide Awards 2005– In partnership with SCDA Architects PTE Ltd as the landscape designer – Lincoln Modern Singapore, 2005
- SILA Runner-up Award for High Density Housing Category, The Loft Condominium, 2003
- SILA Merit Award for Private Residential Category, No. 4 Morley Road, 2001
- SILA Winner Award for Private Housing Category, Residential House at Bintong Park, 1996/7
- SILA Participation Award for Private Housing Category, Camden Road Residence and White House Park Residence, 1996/7
- City of Los Angeles, Historic Preservation Award of Excellence, Wells-Halliday Mansion, 1994
- AIA Merit Award, Unocal Oil Museum, California, 1991
- 2015 President's Design Award, Designer of the Year Singapore.
