= Central Narcotics Bureau =

Singapore's drug enforcement agency

Central Narcotics Bureau Biro Narkotik Pusat 中央肃毒局 மத்திய போதைப்பொருள் ஒழிப்புப் பிரிவு
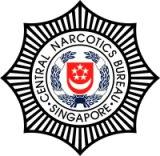
- Abbreviation: CNB
- Motto: A Singapore without drugs, where everyone can live, work and play safely

Agency overview
- Formed: 2 November 1971; 55 years ago

Jurisdictional structure
- National agency: Singapore
- Operations jurisdiction: Singapore
- General nature: Civilian police

Operational structure
- Elected officers responsible: K Shanmugam, Minister for Home Affairs; Edwin Tong, Second Minister for Home Affairs; Muhammad Faishal Ibrahim, Senior Minister of State for Home Affairs; Sim Ann, Senior Minister of State for Home Affair; Goh Pei Ming, Minister of State for Home Affairs
- Agency executives: Tay Say Hwee, Sebastian, Director; Tang Zhixiong, Aaron, Deputy Director (Operations); Sng Chern Hong, Deputy Director (Policy & Administration)
- Parent agency: Ministry of Home Affairs

Website
- http://www.cnb.gov.sg/

The Central Narcotics Bureau (CNB; Malay: Biro Narkotik Pusat; Chinese: 中央肃毒局; Tamil: மத்திய போதைப்பொருள் ஒழிப்புப் பிரிவு) is a department under the Ministry of Home Affairs (MHA) tasked to combat drug trafficking and distribution and is responsible for coordinating all matters pertaining to drug eradication in Singapore.

== History ==
On 19 October 1971, the Government of Singapore announced that a new and dedicated Central Narcotics Bureau (CNB), would be set up within the Ministry of Home Affairs (MHA). Minister for Home Affairs Wong Lin Ken said,

"Such activities will be coordinated in the Central Narcotics Bureau. CNB also plans to build a capacity to educate the public in the dangers of drug abuse".

In 1973, the Singapore Government introduced the Misuse of Drugs Act (MDA) to deal with drug traffickers, pushers and addicts.

The enactment of the MDA was intended to consolidate the provisions of the Dangerous Drugs Ordinance 1951 (DDO) and Drugs (Prevention of Misuse) Act 1969 (DPMA), and secondly to more effectively deal with the worsening drug situation.

New legislation was deemed to be necessary by then-Minister for Health Chua Sian Chin in Parliament in 1973.

"The Dangerous Drugs Act (i.e. DDO) was enacted about 21 years ago and the controls provided therein are grossly inadequate for the 70's, with the introduction of a host of new drugs of medical value if properly used."

The need was exacerbated by Singapore's geographical location and development into a trading hub. The proximity to the Golden Triangle is another oft-cited justification for tough anti-drug laws.

"What soft options do you have in dealing with such a deep-seated problem like drug addiction? We are tough on drugs as we are tough on crime and we are not apologetic about it. Had we not imposed the death penalty for drug trafficking, the situation would be worse. The rationale is very simple. Singapore is a small country and we cannot afford the luxury of having its citizens hooked on drugs for the rest of their lives."

— former Central Narcotics Bureau director Tee Tua Ba defending Singapore's zero tolerance approach to illegal drugs

In November 1993, the "Committee to Improve the Drug Situation in Singapore" was set up to look into the drug situation and it recommended a total and integrated approach to deal with the drug problem.

The four main anti-drug strategies are Preventive Drug Education, Rigorous Enforcement, Treatment and Rehabilitation for addicts, and Aftercare and Continued Rehabilitation for ex-addicts to reintegrate them into society.

The CNB was to be in charge of Rigorous Enforcement and Preventive Drug Education.

== Functions ==
=== Drug enforcement ===
==== Legal Powers ====
All Narcotics Officers are defined as an "officer of the Bureau" under the Misuse of Drugs Act. This empowers them to enter and search any place reasonably believed to contain controlled drugs without a warrant. They may also search a person or subject persons to urine or hair tests.

==== Raids ====
The CNB conducts regular nationwide operations to conduct checks against drug abusers and ex-drug abusers who may have relapsed. Other than island-wide operations, the CNB conducts operations targeted at specific areas where intelligence sources indicate that drug activity is taking place. The CNB officers also work in closely with officers from other Home Team agencies such as the Singapore Police Force (SPF) and the Immigration and Checkpoints Authority (ICA).

==== Sting Operations ====
CNB officers acting undercover have been involved in sting operations which resulted in the arrest and prosecution of several drug traffickers. The undercover officer would typically be introduced to the target by an informant, and then negotiate the purchase of wholesale amounts of narcotics while the meeting was being covertly observed by other CNB officers.

The undercover officer would use considerable acting skills so as not to raise suspicion in the target, such as bargaining down the price rather than seeming too keen in accepting the first offer from the seller. Once the drugs were handed over, the other officers then moved in to arrest the suspect and any accomplices.

The CNB has also worked with foreign agencies such as the American DEA to mount sting operations in Singapore, often by allowing an undercover DEA agent to pose as either a drug mule or a fellow drug trafficker, then having CNB officers move in to make an arrest after the drug transaction had been completed.

=== Preventive drug education ===
Drug trafficking is commonly known in the country as a criminal offence punishable by hanging, which is enforced under Second Schedule of the Misuse of Drugs Act, any person importing, exporting, or found in possession of more than the threshold quantities of illegal drugs can a mandatory death sentence.

Examples of high-profile cases such as the capital punishment of drug traffickers Van Tuong Nguyen, Shanmugam Murugesu, and Nagaenthran K. Dharmalingam.

The CNB's Preventive Education Unit (PEU) was formed in 1992 to focus solely on the formation and implementation of preventive drug education (PDE) programmes in Singapore.

Such PDE programmes include the Anti-Drug Abuse Carnival 2015. Actor Jackie Chan was named in May 2015 as the first celebrity anti-drug ambassador of the country.

In 2021, a short film titled Down The Rabbit Hole was created by the CNB to remind young people of the hazards of drug abuse. Actress Jasmine Sim starred as the main character and antagonist of the film, where she portrayed a drug trafficker.

== Personnel ==
CNB officers are public servants by law and are part of the Singapore Civil Service. The Director of CNB reports to the Minister for Home Affairs and Permanent Secretary for Home Affairs.

=== Recruitment ===
All new Narcotics Officers must undergo a period of residential training in the Home Team Academy (HTA) and pass all required tests. Potential recruits can enter either as a Direct-Entry Inspector or a Direct-Entry Sergeant.

Male recruits must be physically fit (i.e. pass the IPPT). They must also have completed National Service (NS) with a Physical Employment Status (PES) of A or B1, which implies that they are the medically fit.

For male CNB officers, their NS liabilities will be paused as long as they are in the Bureau, making them the equivalent of regular officers in the Singapore Armed Forces (SAF), Singapore Police Force (SPF) and Singapore Civil Defence Force (SCDF).

==== Direct-Entry Inspector ====
Potential Inspectors undergo nine months of basic training to learn various skills such as applying knowledge of criminal laws, investigation techniques, self-defence tactics and weapons handling. The nine-month training phase also includes an overseas component. There is a two-year bond which must be fulfilled lest a financial penalty be imposed.

After graduation, Direct-Entry Inspectors enter a foundation 1.5-year posting at the Enforcement Division or Investigation Division.

==== Direct-Entry Sergeant ====
Direct-Entry Sergeants must minimally be a Higher NITEC, GCE A-Level or Polytechnic Diploma holder. They undergo six months of basic training before being posted out to various work units for on-the-job training.

=== Special Task Force ===
The CNB maintains a small, specialised and covert unit, the Special Task Force (STF).

The STF carry out high risk operations such as vehicle pursuits, conducting house raids, forced entry, and performing round-the-clock surveillance of syndicate activities since 1997.

Officers must have at least two years of experience in the CNB in order to join the STF.

== Organisation structure ==
The CNB is headed by a director, who is assisted by a deputy director.

CNB Leadership
Appointment	Officeholder
Director CNB	Tee Chong Fui Sam
Deputy Director CNB	CHAN Liang Hua Leon
Principal Psychologist	Salina Binte Samion

Supporting the director and deputy director are the operational line and staff divisions, namely Intelligence Division, Enforcement Division, Investigation Division, Operations Division, Policy, Planning and Research Division, Corporate Services Division, Communications Division and Staff Development Division.

There is also an Internal Investigations Office and Psychology Unit that provide additional staff support.

Enforcement Sector 1 covers the geographical boundaries served by the Singapore Police Force's 'A' (Central), 'E' (Tanglin), and 'G' (Bedok) divisions, as well as Marine and Airport. Enforcement Sector 2 covers the geographical boundaries served by SPF's 'F' (Ang Mo Kio), 'J' (Jurong) and 'L' (Woodlands) divisions, as well as Tuas and Woodlands Checkpoints.

CNB Divisions
Division	Director
Enforcement Sector 1	DAC Ong Pang Thong
Enforcement Sector 2	AC Lim Fung Suan
Intelligence Division	SUPT Tang Zhixiong Aaron
Investigation Division	AC Adam B Fashe Huddin
Operations Division	SUPT Ng Boon Ho Thomas; SUPT Saherly Bin Limat
Communications Division	AC Sng Chern Hong
Corporate Services Division	Yip Wai Meng
Policy, Planning and Research Division	SUPT Ng Khai Song
Staff Development Division	Delphine Lee Ping Ping

== Equipment ==
CNB officers are issued and trained in firearms. Officers are also trained and issued with expandable batons for less than lethal self-defense options, bulletproof vests and handcuffs for restrains.

STF officers have access to battering rams and electric cutters for forced entry.

Model	Origin	Type
Glock 19	Austria	Semi-automatic pistol
Heckler & Koch USP Compact	Germany	Semi-automatic pistol
