= True Heroes (TV series) =

- Title card
- 真心英雄
- Genre: Police procedural
- Starring: Christopher Lee; Phyllis Quek; Allan Wu; Yvonne Lim; Jeanette Aw
- Opening theme: 在你左右 by Christopher Lee
- Ending theme: 英雄好汉 by Christopher Lee 每一天的思恋 by Christopher Lee and Phyllis Quek
- Country of origin: Singapore
- Original language: Chinese
- No. of episodes: 25

Production
- Producer: Yeo Saik Pin
- Running time: approx. 45 minutes

Original release
- Network: MediaCorp Channel 8
- Release: 5 May – 6 June 2003

True Heroes (真心英雄) is a 2003 Singaporean police procedural drama series produced by MediaCorp. It revolves around the daily lives of three police officers named SGT Chen Junhao (Christopher Lee), SGT Cai Kexin (Phyllis Quek) and SSGT Wang Feng (Allan Wu) in the Neighbourhood Police Centre based at Ang Mo Kio Police Division located at Ang Mo Kio in Singapore. It stars Christopher Lee, Phyllis Quek, Allan Wu, Yvonne Lim & Jeanette Aw as the casts of the series. The show was endorsed by the Singapore Police Force, which opened up facilities such as the Ang Mo Kio Police Division and the Old Police Academy facilities, and loaned real police vehicles and equipment for filming purposes.

== Plot ==
Real crimes such as the spider burglar, VCD piracy, juvenile delinquency, gangsterism, gambling, loan sharking and cybercrime have been woven into this 25-episode police procedural. The police officers in the story stay alert daily to provide security to the civilians, making them the "True Heroes".

Chen Junhao (Christopher Lee) is a righteous and courageous police officer who graduated with top honours from Old Police Academy and harbours the ambition to follow his father Chen Rongyao's (Moses Lim) footsteps into the elite Criminal Investigation Department. He is sorely disappointed when he learns that he has been assigned to a Neighbourhood Police Centre located at Ang Mo Kio Police Division. At the NPC, Junhao and his new colleague Wang Feng (Allan Wu) do not see eye to eye and their relationship further deteriorates when Junhao accidentally mistakes Wang Feng's father Wang Jiancheng (Huang Wenyong) for a burglar and "arrests" him because he was merely asking his wife Zhong Xiaolan (Lin Meijiao) for money but she refused to give him money anymore because he was extremely addicted to gambling and owed lots of money to multiple loan sharks. As a result, to no avail, he went on to attempt housebreaking and stole money at the Wang family's home, which they lived in a Ang Mo Kio HDB Flat located at Blk 170, Ang Mo Kio Avenue 4.

During a big fire, Junhao saves the life of an old lady (Li Yinzhu), earning the adoration of the old lady's granddaughter, Irene (Yvonne Lim), who is the neighbourhood "ah lian". Much to Junhao's annoyance, Irene tries to come between him and his colleague-cum-love-interest, Cai Kexin (Phyllis Quek).

Wang Feng falls for Junhao's younger sister Chen Huimin (Jeanette Aw), a Nurse working at Singapore General Hospital and attempts to patch up his relationship with his younger brother Wang Wei (Zen Chong). He eventually changes his mind about Junhao when the latter saves him during a mission. Junhao also accepts Wang Feng after uncovering his troubled and complex family life.

Junhao's best friend Wu Zhiguang (Cavin Soh) uses his identity to commit multiple sex crimes and Junhao ends up taking the rap and is jailed. Kexin's younger sister Cai Kejuan (Zhang Chunmei) has been kidnapped by Irene as revenge against her for causing the latter's grandmother's death in a traffic accident. Wang Feng witnesses the stabbing of Wang Wei, who eventually dies in the hands of a Loan Shark named Hui Ge (Ye Shipin), whom is an enemy of Jiancheng and wanted to take revenge on both him and his younger son Wang Wei. Each officer is tested as their jobs soon catch up with their personal lives.

At the end, Huimin eventually resigns as Nurse and joins the Singapore Police Force as a Police Officer, where she becomes a Sergeant, whereas Kexin gets promoted to Staff Sergeant.

== Cast ==
- Christopher Lee as SGT Chen Junhao
- Phyllis Quek as SGT Cai Kexin, later promoted to SSGT and becomes SSGT Cai Kexin
- Allan Wu as SSGT Wang Feng
- Yvonne Lim as Irene (Villain but repented in the end)
- Jeanette Aw as Chen Huimin (Chen Junhao's Younger Sister), works as a Nurse at Singapore General Hospital but later resigns and joins the Singapore Police Force as a Police Officer and becomes SGT Chen Huimin
- Moses Lim as Chen Rongyao (Chen Junhao's Father), formerly a police officer from Criminal Investigation Department, later retired and currently working as a Taxi Driver and also as the Leader of the Neighbourhood Watch Group
- Zen Chong as Wang Wei (Wang Feng's Younger Brother)
- Cavin Soh as Wu Zhiguang (Chen Junhao's Best Friend) (Villain but repented in the end)
- Huang Wenyong as Wang Jiancheng (Wang Feng's Father) (Villain but repented in the end)
- Lin Meijiao as Zhong Xiaolan (Wang Feng's Mother)
- Alan Tern as CPL Jiang Yijie
- Li Wenhai as ASP Ge Ming
- Jin Yinji as Chen Meizhen (Cai Kexin's Mother)
- Chen Guohua as SGT Liu Zhenyang
- Shaun Chen as Zhang Hanliang
- Li Yinzhu as Irene's Grandmother
- Joey Ng as Esther (Villain but repented in the end)
- Zhang Chunmei as Cai Kejuan (Cai Kexin's Younger Sister)
- Ye Shipin as Hui Ge (Loan Shark) (Main Villain of the series)
- Gary Yap as Mike (Main Villain of the series)
- Zhang Yaodong as Peter (Criminal Investigation Department Police Officer)

== Awards and nominations ==
Year	Award	Category	Nominee	Result	Ref
2003	Star Awards	Best Actor	Christopher Lee	Nominated	
