= Neighbourhood police centre =

Type of police station in Singapore

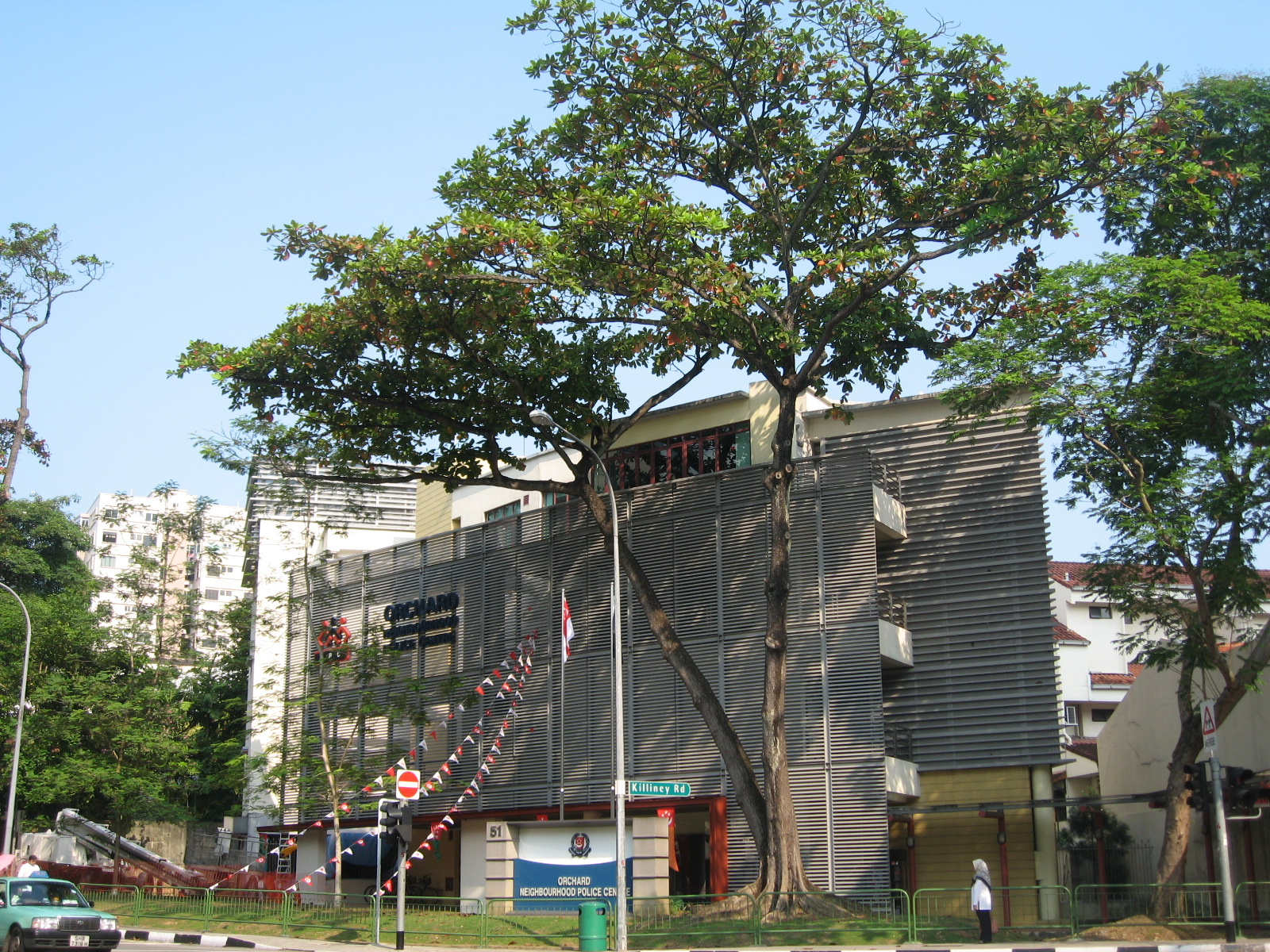
A NPC in Orchard in 2006

A neighbourhood police centre (abbreviation: NPC; Malay: Pusat Polis Kejiranan) is a small to mid-sized police station commonly found in Singapore. It was first introduced during the mid-1990s.

== History ==
To tackle crime rates in Singapore, Prime Minister Lee Kuan Yew suggested that the Japanese Kōban system be studied. Wong Kan Seng proposed the establishment of Neighbourhood Police Posts (NPPs) in Singapore. A feasibility study was established in October 1981 when some officers of the Singapore Police Force and Minister for Home Affairs Chua Sian Chin were sent to Japan to study the Kōban system and train with officers on how the system worked. The neighbourhood police post (NPP) was then piloted in 1983 when Khe Bong NPP post was created with assistance from Japanese police officers visiting Singapore.

The NPC was formed as a result of a review of the NPP system initiated in 1996. While the NPP has helped to reduce crime rates since its introduction in 1983, and perceived positively by the general public, it was limited in its ability to offer greater convenience to the community due to their limited size and scope of duties in individual posts.

The high number of NPPs entailed extensive resources spread over many installations, putting pressure on limited resources available to the police, particularly in terms of manpower. The limited scope of the NPP system was also seen as being less optimal in maximising the operational capabilities of individual police officers, and affecting its abilities to retain talent.

Pooling the NPPs into larger entities known as NPCs was thus proposed as a solution, although it was not meant to completely replace NPPs. About two thirds of NPPs were planned to be retained so as to maintain convenience to the general public, although many will no longer operate round the clock. An intercom system was introduced to overcome this should public assistance be needed when the NPP is closed. With a larger pool of officers and resources, each NPC was able to provide more services in one location with the aim of reducing the time needed to close each case.

Each NPC Officer was also expected to handle not only front-line duties, but also basic investigation work and administrative duties. NPCs would directly liaise with the community for joint programmes and operations within their jurisdiction. This was also helped by having some NPCs sharing the same building with other community agencies, such as Community Centres.

In 1997, plans were drawn up the roll out the NPC system across the country over four phases. The Pilot Phase was introduced in Clementi Police Division in October 1997, with the building of three NPCs. The first NPC, Queenstown Neighbourhood Police Centre, was opened at a temporary site opposite Queenstown MRT station on 1 October 1997, and officially opened by Wong Kan Seng, Minister for Home Affairs, on 20 December 1997. Later assessment of the NPCs under Clementi were deemed to be a success.

The first phase was planned to be implemented in February 1999 to cover the West Region with six NPCs, the second phase by October 1999 covering the East and North-East Regions with 12 NPCs, and the third phase in the Central Region with 11 NPCs by July 2000. There would thus be 32 NPCs, and the number of NPPs would be reduced from 91 in 1997 to 66 by 2000.

During the implementation of the plan, several refinements were made, including an abandonment of the planned replacement of the Land Divisions with Regional Commands, and a review of the organisational setup within the NPCs. The roll-out faced a discernible level of public discontent, many of whom were still unaware of the NPC system despite extensive publicity efforts by the police. The primary concern was over the closure of NPPs within their neighbourhoods, and the reduced operation hours of retained NPPs.

Nonetheless, all 35 NPCs were successfully opened, although some were delayed due to slower urban development in some areas than expected. The 33rd NPC, Marina Bay Neighbourhood Police Centre had been opened on 6 February 2010.

Two more Neighbourhood Police Centres had also been opened in Punggol and Woodlands West on 30 December 2012.

== Organisation ==
Initial roll-out plans for the NPCs entailed the creation of six Regional Commands, which are to replace the existing seven Land Divisions. The Regional Commands of East, North, North East, and West, were aligned to the URA's planning regions, with the exception of the Central Region which will be served by two Commands, namely Central East and Central West.

This plan was, however, abolished, and the Land Division system retained, although one of them, Geylang Police Division, was closed and absorbed into Ang Mo Kio and Bedok divisions in December 2000. New NPCs were thus organised within the existing Land Divisional structure, with only minor adjustments to division borders. As a result, some Divisions are much larger than others in terms of number of NPCs under their command, with Ang Mo Kio Police Division having nine NPCs while Central Police Division has three.

NPCs differ from NPPs, in that the former have boundaries broadly aligned with that of their respective Development Guide Plans (or planning areas) drawn up by the Urban Redevelopment Authority, as opposed to the later which was based on electoral divisions. NPC boundaries are permanent, while NPP boundaries may change each election should there be a review of electoral boundaries. Planning areas with higher demographies may have two NPCs, namely in Ang Mo Kio, Bedok, Bukit Merah, Jurong West and Yishun, while smaller planning areas may be combined and served by a single NPC, such as in the Central Area.

Each NPC is headed by a commanding officer (CO), with the assistance of an operations officer (OO). The pool of officers in the NPC, known as neighbourhood police centre officers (NPCOs) are grouped into four Teams, each headed by a team leader (TL) and assisted by a deputy team leader (DTL). The CO and OO are senior police officer positions.

In 2013, it was reported that 21 NPCs have begun to use social media to get public assistance in solving crimes in their local areas.

== See also ==
- Crime in Singapore
