= Toa Payoh Police Station =

Former police division in Singapore

Coordinates: 01°20′23″N 103°51′0″E

The Toa Payoh Police Division (or 'B' Division, Chinese: 大巴窑警区, Malay: Divisyen Polis Toa Payoh) was a former police division of the Singapore Police Force, operating from 1977 to 1988.

== History ==
First formed in 1950 as the Kandang Kerbau Police Station beside the old KK Hospital building (near the present day Land Transport Authority, Hampshire Office) at Kampong Java Road, it was moved to the new Toa Payoh Police Station in 1977 and was subsequently renamed 'B' Division, as part of the Singapore government's effort in providing every new town with a police presence.

Toa Payoh Police division was closed down in 1988, with its areas of control taken over by Tanglin Police Division ('E' Division) & Ang Mo Kio Police Division ('F' Division), respectively. The station became the Headquarters for the Police Volunteer Special Constabulary from 1988 until 1994, when Force Communications Branch of the Police Technology Department took over the use of the building. The building was vacated again in year 2000 for a major refurbishment before utilisation by the Security Command.

== See also ==
- Toa Payoh ritual murders
