= Police Technology Department =

Coordinates: 1°19′27.56″N 103°50′43.24″E

The Police Technology Department is the IT arm of the Singapore Police Force.

== History ==
The Data Processing Unit (DPU) was formed in 1971 to handle the Data Processing requirements and needs of the SPF. A year later, the 1st computerized system for SPF, Accident Statistics (Batch) was developed under the Computer Services Department, Ministry of Finance.

With the expansion of DPU, it was renamed to the Electronics, Computers and Communications Department (ECC) in 1981. ECC consisted of two main divisions, the Computer Systems Division which was responsible for computer and IT systems and the Force Communications Branch which was responsible for managing SPF's communication systems. ECC was awarded the ISO 9001 standard certification in November 1999.

The ECC merged with the Technology Planning Division of the Planning and Organisation Department and the Special Project (C3) Department to form a new Police Technology Department on April 15, 2000.

A year later, on April 15, 2001, the Police Coast Guard (PCG) IT Branch was integrated into the PTD.

== Directors ==
Director	From	To
AC Ng Yow Meng	unknown (Head ECC)	2001
AC Soh Kee Hean	2001	October 1, 2004
Mr Kan Siew Ning	October 1, 2004	November 11, 2011
