= Singapore Police Force =

National police force of Singapore

Singapore Police Force Pasukan Polis Singapura (Malay) 新加坡警察部队 (Chinese) சிங்கப்பூர் காவல் துறை (Tamil)
- Badge of the Singapore Police Force, with the old name in Malay
- Common name: Polis Repablik Singapura
- Abbreviation: SPF
- Motto: Setia dan Bakti (Loyalty and Service)

Agency overview
- Formed: 1946; 80 years ago
- Preceding agency: Straits Settlements Police Force
- Legal personality: Police force

Jurisdictional structure
- National agency: Singapore
- Operations jurisdiction: Singapore
- General nature: Civilian police

Operational structure
- Headquarters: 28 Irrawaddy Road, New Phoenix Park, Singapore 329560
- Active personnels: 10,400 regulars 2,400 conscripts 11,100 civilian volunteers
- Reserve officers: 26,459 reservists 1,266 civilian volunteers
- Elected officers responsible: K. Shanmugam, Minister for Home Affairs; Edwin Tong, Second Minister; Sim Ann, Second Minister; Goh Pei Ming, Senior Minister of State; Zhulkarnain Abdul Rahim, Minister of State
- Agency executives: How Kwang Hwee, Commissioner of Police; Teo Chun Ching, Deputy Commissioner of Police (Policy); Zhang Weihan, Deputy Commissioner of Police (Investigations & Intelligence); Alvin Moh, Deputy Commissioner of Police (Operations)
- Parent agency: Ministry of Home Affairs
- Staff departments: 21: Commercial Affairs Department; Criminal Investigation Department; Ops-Tech Department; Police Intelligence Department; Police Psychological Services Department; Administration and Finance Department; Centre of Protective Security; Community Partnership Department; Inspectorate and Compliance Office; Internal Affairs Office; International Cooperation Department; Manpower Department; Online Criminal Harms Act Office; Operations Department; Planning and Organisation Department; Police Regulatory Department; Police Logistics Department; Police National Service Department; Public Affairs Department; Service Delivery Department; Training & Capability Development Department; Volunteer Special Constabulary
- Specialist and line units: 18: Airport Police Division; Ang Mo Kio Police Division; Bedok Police Division; Central Police Division; Clementi Police Division; Jurong Police Division; Tanglin Police Division; Woodlands Police Division; Gurkha Contingent; Home Team School of Criminal Investigation; Police Coast Guard; Police Operations Command Centre; Protective Security Command; Public Transport Security Command; Police Security Command; Special Operations Command; Traffic Police; Training Command

Facilities
- NPCs/NPPs: 97
- Police boats: 61

Website
- police.gov.sg

The Singapore Police Force (SPF) is the national and principal law enforcement agency responsible for the prevention of crime and law enforcement in Singapore. It is the country's lead agency against organised crime, human and weapons trafficking, cyber crime and economic crimes which go across domestic and international borders. It can also be tasked with investigating any crime under the purview of the Ministry of Home Affairs (MHA) and is accountable to Parliament.

SPF's main geographical area of responsibility covers the entire country, consisting of five regions which are further divided into 55 planning areas. The organisation has various staff departments with specific focuses. These include the Airport Police Division (APD), which covers policing of Singapore's main civilian airports of Changi and Seletar, or the Police Coast Guard (PCG), which protects and enforces areas under Singapore's territorial waters and its ports.

Formerly known as the Republic of Singapore Police (RSP), (Note: Malay: Polis Repablik Singapura; this name is still present on the badge and is the legal alias of the Force.) the SPF is a uniformed organisation. The SPF has declared its mission and vision as to "prevent, deter and detect crime to ensure the safety and security of Singapore". It is Singapore's point of contact for foreign agencies such as Interpol and other international law enforcement agencies. The organisational structure of the SPF is split between staff and line functions, which is roughly modelled after the Singapore Armed Forces (SAF).

The SPF currently consists of sixteen staff departments, four specialist staff departments, eighteen specialist and line units as well as seven land divisions. Its headquarters are located at one of the blocks of the New Phoenix Park building in the Novena district, which is located directly adjacent to a twin block occupied by the MHA. Situated within the headquarters are the Police Heritage Centre (PHC), which is open to the public and showcases the SPF's history through its various exhibits and multimedia displays.

As of 2023, the SPF has a strength of approximately 11,500 personnel: 10,400 sworn officers and 1,100 civilian staff. The SPF has generally been credited as being the forefront in keeping crime in Singapore low, as well as being relatively transparent in its policing. Accordingly, Singapore has been considered as being one of least corrupt and safest countries in the world. The SPF also works closely with the Internal Security Department (ISD) and the Corrupt Practices Investigation Bureau (CPIB). As of January 2026, the current Minister of Home Affairs is K. Shanmugam, while the current commissioner of the SPF is How Kwang Hwee.

== History ==
The history of the Singapore Police Force is a long one, and in many ways, has paralleled the astronomical economic growth of the country the force is tasked to protect. From a staff of eleven men based in a simple attap hut, the force has grown to over 36,000 men and women, basing their operations from thirty-two neighbourhood police centres (NPCs), 60 neighbourhood police posts (NPPs), and various other land and marine establishments spread across the country.

=== Early years ===
The Singapore Police Force has a heritage almost as old as that of modern Singapore, with the first police force in Singapore having been formed in 1820 with a skeleton force of 11 men under the command of Francis James Bernard, son-in-law of William Farquhar. With no background nor knowledge on policing, Bernard had to work from scratch, as well as occasionally turning to Farquhar for help. In addition, he held multiple roles as magistrate, chief jailer, harbour master, marine storekeeper, as well as personal assistant to Farquhar.

Despite these constraints, Bernard managed to establish the force by recruiting a jemadar (Asian sergeant), eight peons (patrolmen), a jailer, and a Malay writer, kept in operation by a monthly budget of $300. It is likely that some of these men were recruited from amongst the Indian sepoys brought to the settlement by its founder, Sir Stamford Raffles. Manpower constraints meant that the men had to perform a wide range of roles, and required the help of headmen amongst the various ethnic communities to maintain orderliness on the streets, all the more possible as the communities lived in segregated areas around the city.

As the department took form, Bernard became in charge of a writer, one jailor, one jemadar (sergeant) and eight peada (constables) by May 1820. Raffles approved these arrangements by August 1820 and cemented the formal establishment of a police force in Singapore. Manpower constraints meant that the men had to perform a wide range of roles, and required the help of headmen among the various ethnic communities to maintain orderliness on the streets.

This partnership with the community was in line with Raffles's vision of a thriving colony largely self-regulated by local social structures, with the British masters administrating it via indirect rule. The large influx of migrants from China, however, began to test this system when the hands-off approach by the British allowed Secret societies in Singapore to thrive. Although originally formed with legal intentions of community bonding and the provision of assistance to fellow migrants, these societies gradually became influential, competitive, and increasingly engaged in illegal activities including monetary extortion from the masses, the operation of gambling dens, and the smuggling of illegal goods on top of more legal commercial operations to meet their financial needs.

Headed by Europeans and predominantly staffed by Malay and Indian officers, the force had little Chinese representation as the military and policing professionals were traditionally shunned by the Chinese community, which therefore impaired policing efforts amongst the large Chinese populace.

Criminal violence was not merely in the domain of the ethnic Chinese, however. Rivalries between Malay princes and communities also often result in acts of violence, which prompted the passing of Singapore's first arms law in March 1823 restricting the right to bear arms to twenty-four of the Malay Sultan's followers.

In 1826, when Singapore was grouped together with Penang and Malacca to form the Straits Settlements, the police force was put under charge of John Prince, who became the Resident Councillor of Singapore on 4 January 1827. Singapore faced very high crime rates because of the large amount of poor immigrants and occasional pirate attacks. Many crimes went unreported or uninvestigated due to the quick increase in population. The force was also very low in morale, as they were not able to help everyone they could, and also very poorly supervised. Singapore's first executions were thus held in the wake of the first criminal session in June 1828, when a Chinese and Indian were found guilty and convicted for murder.

In 1843, the force consisted of Thomas Dunman, who was a deputy magistrate doubling as a deputy superintendent, three European constables and an assistant native constable, fourteen officers and 110 policemen. With a total strength of no more than 150 men, the force was compelled to avoid direct intervention in these mass acts of violence, or risk almost total annihilation.

Competition gradually heated up between large rival factions, such as that between the larger Ghee Hin Kongsi, the Ghee Hock Kongsi and the Han San Kongsi. Murders, mass riots, kidnappings, arson and other serious crimes became commonplace in the four decades after the colony's founding. Faced with violent acts of crime which may involve thousands, such as the Funeral riots in 1846 involving 9000 members from the Ghee Hin and Ghee Hock secret societies, the police force was woefully incapable of bringing the situation under control, and often had to call in the army for assistance. The escalating number of serious crimes prompted the need for stronger legislation to deter would-be criminals.

A repeat of this scenario occurred in 1851, when lingering displeasure against Roman Catholic ethnic Chinese erupted into major rioting leaving over 500 Chinese dead. The army was called in again, although it involved having to induct Indian convicts into military service almost overnight.

In 1854, twelve consecutive days of violence sparked by a dispute between the Hokkiens and Teochews disrupted trade. This particular incident led to the formation of the military's Singapore Volunteer Corps on 8 July 1854, the earliest predecessor of the Singapore Armed Forces' People's Defence Force today.

On 1 April 1867, as the Straits Settlements became a crown colony, with the enactment of the Police Force Ordinance of 1871, the police forces in Penang, Malacca and Singapore underwent a reorganisation in 1872 and were formally consolidated and structured as the Straits Settlements Police Force.

In the mid-1920s, many Chinese migrants came to Malaya and Singapore. Some had links to secret societies. Weapons started showing up because firearms were being smuggled into China from Southeast Asian countries, then passed along or brought over by migrants. As a result, faction fighting, robberies and murders increased. In 1929, the Police Force established the Police Training School and improved working conditions at new police stations. Its law enforcement against secret society members and communists helped make Singapore safer, but resentment among those also increased who viewed it as a tool of the British colonial government.

Many laws that were enacted during this time still remains in force today. These include the passing of Singapore's first arms law back in March 1823, which heavily restricts the ability to bear arms. Nearly two centuries later, these anti-arms laws continue to be strictly enforced, resulting in a society relatively free from firearms-related criminal offences.

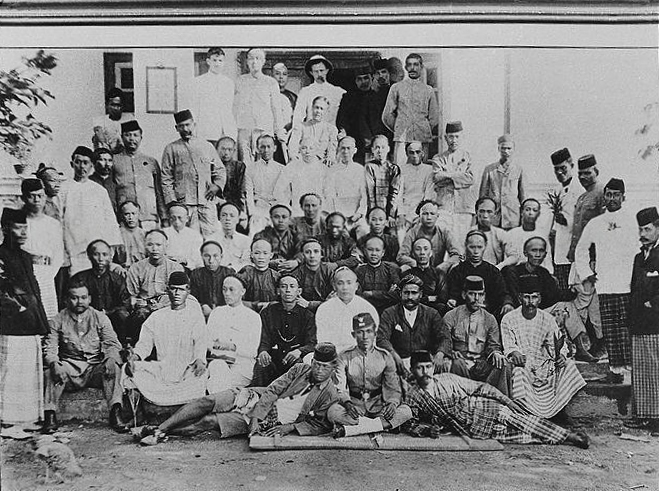
Members of the Straits Settlements Police Force in 1890

During the Japanese occupation of Singapore of the World War II from 15 February 1942, many of its leaders, including the Inspector-General Arthur Harold Dickinson, were later interned at Changi Prison and the police force came under the Japanese Kempeitai until 1945.

Following end of the World War II, the British Military Administration of Malaya took charge of Malaya and Singapore on 5 September 1945, and the police force in Singapore was led by Colonel Robert Edward Foulger. When the Straits Settlements was dissolved, both Malacca and Penang became part of Malayan Union and Singapore became a crown colony on 1 April 1946, the British Military Administration was then dissolved. The police force was later renamed to the Singapore Police Force.

As Singapore transitioned to self-governance to form State of Singapore on 3 June 1959, the police force was later renamed to Polis Negara Singapura in December 1959.

Singapore later merged with Federation of Malaysia on 16 September 1963 as one of the states of Malaysia, during this period the police force was integrated into the Polis Di-Raja Malaysia along with the police forces of Malaya, Sabah and Sarawak.

=== 1965–present ===
Following Singapore's independence from Malaysia as the Republic of Singapore on 9 August 1965, the name of the police force was updated to Polis Repablik Singapura, before eventually returning to its current English designation, the Singapore Police Force.

The Singapore Police Force remains the sole policing force in Singapore after its independence. The country has one of the lowest murder rates in the world, as well as the lowest firearm-related death rates. The major crimes that tend to affect the Singaporean populace in the 21st century are usually cybercrimes, such as scams that are often based overseas. In 2020, cybercrimes made up almost half of all crimes in Singapore.

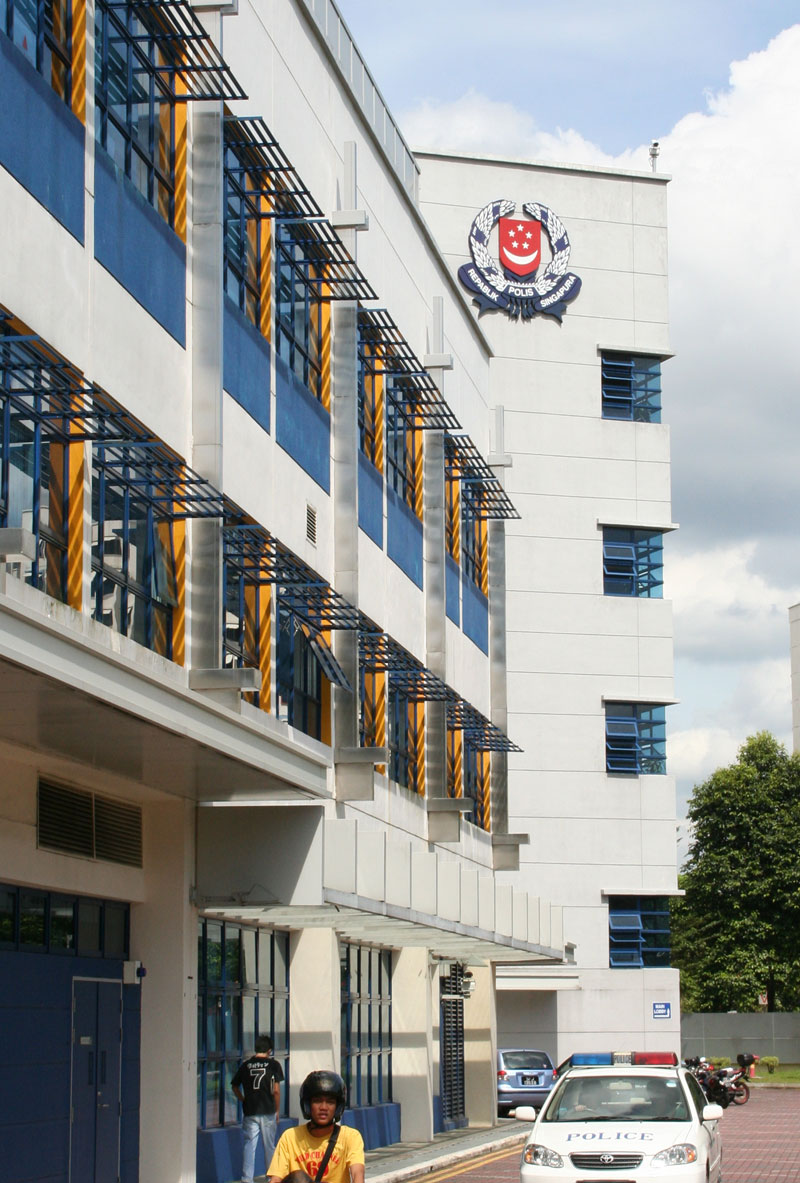
The headquarters of Jurong Police Division, with the Singapore Police Force crest prominently displayed

In 2025, Singapore police have investigated over 850 scam cases that have resulted in financial losses totaling approximately SG$15.4 million. These scams involve phishing, impersonation, and fraudulent online transactions, targeting individuals and businesses across the country. Authorities are actively working to identify the perpetrators, recover the stolen funds, and raise public awareness about scam prevention.

== Organisational structure ==
=== Leadership ===
Rank and appointment	Abbreviation	Office holder
Commissioner of Police	CP	How Kwang Hwee
Deputy Commissioner of Police (Policy)	DC(P)	Teo Chun Ching
Deputy Commissioner of Police (Investigations & Intelligence)	DC(I&I)	Zhang Weihan
Deputy Commissioner of Police (Operations)	DC(Ops)	Alvin Moh

=== Staff departments ===
Department	Abbreviation	Area of responsibility	Ref
Administration & Finance Department	A&F	Administrative, finance and procurement services	
Centre for Protective Security	CPS	Training and maintenance of protective security standards	
Community Partnership Department	CPD	Community engagement and crime prevention	
Inspectorate and Compliance Office	InCo	Internal audit and risk management	
Internal Affairs Office	IAO	Handling of internal investigations	
International Cooperation Department	ICD	Maintenance of relations with foreign law enforcement agencies as well as handling transnational and international police operations	
Manpower Department	MPD	Human resource management and recruitment programmes	
Online Criminal Harms Act Office	OCHA	Enforcing the Online Criminal Harms Act through cooperation with online service providers and other government agencies to prevent and disrupt cyber crime.	
Operations Department	OPD	Responsible for operational matters including the development of doctrines and standard operating procedures; oversees the Police Operations Command Centre	
Planning and Organisation Department	P&O	Strategic planning and organisational development	
Police Regulatory Department	PRD	Processing and enforcement of various police licenses	
Police Logistics Department	PLD	Procurement, distribution and maintenance of equipment	
Police National Service Department	PNSD	Human resource management of Police National Servicemen	
Public Affairs Department	PAD	Public relations and media relations	
Service Delivery Department	SDD	Handling of public feedback and service quality affairs	
Training & Capability Development Department	TCDD	Development of training policy, methodologies and training safety	
Volunteer Special Constabulary	VSC	Human resource management of volunteer police officers	

=== Specialist staff departments ===
Department	Abbreviation	Area of responsibility	Ref
Commercial Affairs Department	CAD	Detection and investigation of financial crime	
Criminal Investigation Department	CID	Primary detective agency and investigative body	
Ops-Tech Department	OTD	Development of Science & Technology	
Police Intelligence Department	PID	Gathering and processing of police intelligence	
Police Psychological Services Department	PPSD	Handling psychological matters	

=== Specialist and land units ===
Units	Abbreviation	Area of responsibility	Ref
Ang Mo Kio Police Division	'F' Division	Ang Mo Kio, Serangoon, Hougang, Sengkang, Punggol, Seletar	
Bedok Police Division	'G' Division	Changi, Pasir Ris, Tampines, Bedok, Paya Lebar, Marine Parade, Marina East, Geylang	
Central Police Division	'A' Division	Downtown Core, Museum, Outram, Singapore River, Marina South, Straits View, Rochor, Kallang, Bukit Merah East	
Clementi Police Division	'D' Division	Clementi, Queenstown, Jurong East, Bukit Merah West	
Jurong Police Division	'J' Division	Jurong West, Choa Chu Kang, Bukit Panjang, Bukit Batok, Boon Lay, Pioneer, Tuas	
Tanglin Police Division	'E' Division	Bukit Merah, Bukit Timah, River Valley, Tanglin, Orchard, Novena, Toa Payoh, Bishan	
Woodlands Police Division	'L' Division	Yishun, Sembawang, Woodlands, Mandai, Kranji	
Airport Police Division	APD	Changi Airport, Seletar Airport, Changi Airfreight Centre, Airport Logistics Park	
Gurkha Contingent	GC	Paramilitary/Counter-Terrorist Unit	
Home Team School of Criminal Investigation	HTSCI	Conduct training and courses for criminal investigators	
Police Coast Guard	PCG	Providing law enforcement and conducting high-risk maritime operations within Singapore waters	
Police Operations Command Centre	POCC	Command and control of day-to-day incidents	
Public Transport Security Command	TRANSCOM	Protecting the public transport network	
Protective Security Command	ProCom	Protection of key installations and security at key national events and high-footfall public spaces	
Police Security Command	SecCom	Security and protection of government officials such as the president, prime minister, Speaker Of Parliament, Chief Justice, Minister and other VVIPs	
Special Operations Command	SOC	Execution of high-risk tactical operations such as hostage rescue, barricaded and armed suspects, and counterterrorism operations, as well as K-9 operations, crisis negotiation, and protection of vulnerable people in dangerous situations.	
Traffic Police	TP	Enforcement of traffic laws and providing police escorts	
Training Command	TRACOM	Training of police officers and planning and execution of parades and other ceremonial functions	

Land divisions are given designations according to the NATO phonetic alphabet.

Defunct land divisions include:

- Toa Payoh Police Division ('B' Division), merged with Tanglin Police Division
- Geylang Police Division ('C' Division), merged with Bedok Police Division

== Finances ==
The Singapore Police Force receives the highest budget allocation annually as compared to the various departments of the Ministry of Home Affairs (MHA), typically accounting for about 50% of its annual budget. For the fiscal year of 2013 (for the year beginning 1 April 2013), S$3.89 billion was budgeted to the MHA, of which 47.8% or S$1.86 billion was allocated for the Police Programme. Actual expenses in the 2013 fiscal year were S$2.04 billion, of which S$1.88 billion was spent on operating expenditure (against the budgeted S$1.79 billion) and S$159.1 million on development expenditure (budgeted at $71.83 million). Manpower costs amounting to S$1.16 billion continue to dominate the SPF's expenditure, accounting for 61.7% of its operating expenditure and 56.9% of total expenditure in FY2013.

The latest budget for fiscal year 2015, S$2.47 billion was allocated to the Police Programme, or 49.5% of MHA's total budget of S$5 billion (the Ministry of Defence, in comparison, received a S$13.12 billion budget allocation). This includes S$2.26 billion for Operating Expenditure and $210.93 million for Development Expenditure. The main Development Expenditures expected in FY2015 included the construction of new buildings such as the Woodlands Police Divisional HQ as well as the acquisition of new patrol craft for the Police Coast Guard and the installation of police cameras at more HDB blocks and multi-storey car parks.

== Manpower ==
Manpower trends from 2013 to 2020 are shown below:

Year ended	Regulars	Civilians	PNSF	PNSmen	VSC	Total	Refs
31 March 2013	8,617	1,423	4,853	24,248	1,212	40,353	
31 March 2014	8,783	1,544	4,704	25,492	1,076	41,599	
31 March 2015	9,104	1,566	4,623	26,210	1,053	42,556	
31 March 2016	9,482	1,601	4,911	27,151	1,057	44,202	
31 March 2017	9,617	1,593	5,043	27,839	1,084	45,176	
31 March 2018	9,591	1,632	4,766	27,245	1,250	44,484	
31 March 2019	9,636	1,627	4,488	27,691	1,353	44,795	
31 March 2020	9,571	1,135	4,685	26,459	1,266	43,116	

From 2021 onwards, the Singapore Police Force (SPF) published a different set of manpower strength. The number of civilian staff was no longer reported, and the figures for Police National Servicemen Full-time (PNSF) and Police National Servicemen (PNSmen) were consolidated.

As of 31 December 2025, the total manpower strength of the force stands at 42,800. Manpower trends for recent years are shown below:

Year ended	Regulars	PNSF & PNSmen	VSC	Total	Refs
31 March 2021	10,752	32,181	1,229	44,162	
31 March 2022	10,771	32,474	1,160	44,405	
31 March 2023	10,400	32,100	1,100	43,600	
31 March 2024	10,500	28,200	1,100	39,800	
31 March 2024	11,100	30,600	1,100	42,800	

=== Regulars ===
Regulars, or uniformed, full-time officers, constitute about 20% of the police's total workforce and number approximately 10,000 in strength. Basic entry requirements for police officers include normal fitness levels, good eyesight, and at least five passes in the GCE Ordinary level or a NITEC from the Institute of Technical Education, although those with lower qualifications may still be considered. Those joining the senior police officers require a basic degree from a recognised university. Alternatively, police officers from the junior ranks may also be considered for promotion into the senior ranks. Officers serving in the force as national servicemen are also regularly considered for absorption into the regular scheme. Basic training for all officers are conducted at the Home Team Academy, under the purview of the Police Training Command. It takes about six months and nine months to train a new police officer and senior police officer respectively.

As is the case with many other civil service positions in Singapore, the salaries of police officers are reviewed in accordance to market rates. Salaries are kept competitive as part of anti-corruption measures. Gross starting salaries for police officers may range from S$1,820 to S$2,480, and that of senior police officers from S$3,400 to S$4,770, depending on entry qualifications, relevant/useful work experiences and National Service.

Police officers commence their careers as Sergeants (Full GCE 'A' level or Diploma holders), while senior police officers start as Inspectors (bachelor's degree). Reviews of an officer's performance for promotion consideration are conducted annually.

=== Police National Servicemen (PNS) ===
When full-time National Service (NS) was first introduced in Singapore in 1967 in the National Service(NS) (Amendment) Bill, it was initially solely aimed and geared towards the building-up of the Singapore Armed Forces (SAF). Meanwhile, in the Ministry of Home Affairs and the Singapore Police Force, NS was not extended to that of compulsory full-time service, with police NS being only part-time, unlike that of the SAF. Part-time Police National Service involved serving in the Special Constabulary and the Vigilante Corps.

There was little urgency and pressure for the police force to increase its overall manpower-strength until the Laju incident of 1974. This was Singapore's first encounter with international terrorism, which thus demonstrated the need for additionally trained reserve-officers who could be called up at short-notice in the event of a national crisis or a major and serious public emergency.

Singapore's full-time National Service policy was thus extended to the Singapore Police Force in 1975, which stemmed from the then-primary aim of guarding and protecting key and vital public installations, such as sensitive ones like power substations and petrochemical industries. The first intake consisted of 211 full-time Police National Servicemen, who enlisted on 24 July 1975. In 1976, the first Police National Service Officer Cadets passed out as National Service Inspectors. In 1977, the first full-time Police NS cohort completed full-time service and continued as Operationally Ready servicemen, continuing to contribute to policing.

In 1994, there was a further expansion of the Police National Service scheme, with the Police National Service Key Installations Command (PNS KINS) (the predecessor of the present-day Protective Security Command) established to provide protection for key installations. Subsequent expansion of this NS scheme, along with changing security needs and requirements and the trend in outsourcing key-installation protection (such as to the various local auxiliary police forces) has expanded the role of police national servicemen to more varied functions.

Currently, Police NSFs are posted to a variety of vocations. This includes:

- Front-facing Policing Roles:
  - Specialist Units:
    - Protective Security Command
    - Public Transport Security Command
    - Police Coast Guard
    - Special Operations Command
  - Land Divisions
    - Ground Response Force
- Support Roles
  - Trainers in the aforementioned units and Training Command
  - Staff Assistants (SAs) based in offices.

The PNSFs serve alongside their regular counterparts.

=== Volunteers ===
Formed in 1946, The Volunteer Special Constabulary (VSC) is an important component of the Singapore Police Force, contributing more than fifty years of volunteer service to the nation.

The VSC is composed of volunteers from all walks of life in Singapore, from businessmen to blue-collar executives to even bus captains, bonded with the same aspiration to serve the nation by complementing the Singapore Police Force. They are vested with equal powers of a police officer to enforce law and order in Singapore. VSC Officers don the same police uniform and patrol the streets, participate in anti-drug operations and sometimes even high-speed sea chases.

Previously headquartered at the Eu Tong Sen Street Police Station and Toa Payoh Police Station, it relocated to the new Police Cantonment Complex in the year 2000.

=== Civilian staff ===
Civilian staff in the Police Force are deployed in areas such as technology, logistics, human resource, and administrative and financial services as well as investigation, planning and intelligence. The civilian staff schemes fall under the general civil service schemes managed by the Public Service Division. These schemes include:

- Commercial Affairs Officer (CAO) Scheme for Accountancy, Law, Business Administration, Business or Economics degree holders
  - Commercial Affairs Officer
- Home Team Specialist (HTS) Scheme for degree and diploma holders
  - Home Team Specialist
- Home Affairs Senior Executive (HASE) Scheme for degree holders
  - Management Executive (MX)
- Management Support Scheme for diploma holders and below
  - Management Support Officer (MSO)
  - Corporate Support Officer (CSO)
- Technical Support Scheme for diploma holders and below
  - Technical Support Officer (TSO)

The civilisation of non-core police functions has accelerated over the years in order to free up additional manpower for redeployment into Police Divisions. Other changes include the deployment of contract staff through organisations such as Ministry of Finance's VITAL.org for administrative staff and partners such as ST Engineering and Cyber Security Agency for technical support.

=== Staff welfare ===
- Aquatic Club
- Home United Basketball Club (HUBC)
- Home United Football Club (HUFC)
- JOM – Clubhouse for Police Officers
- POLWEL Co-operative Society Limited
- Police Sports Association (PSA)
- Police Welfare Division
- Senior Police Officers' Mess (SPOM)
- Singapore Police Co-operative Society Limited

== Uniforms ==
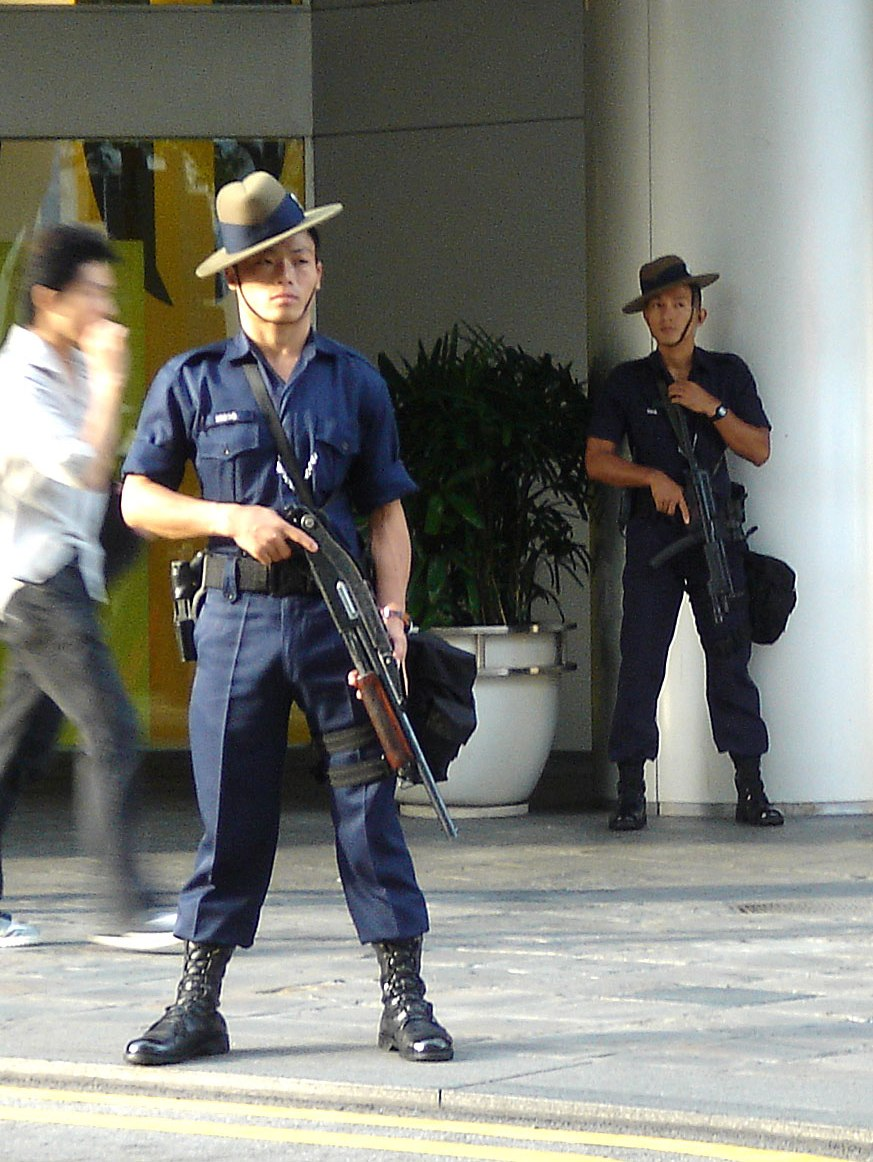
Gurkha Contingent police officers

Dark blue is the organisational colour of the Singapore Police Force and has remained so continuously since 1969. Derivatives of the standard blue uniform (collectively called the No. 3 uniform) was adopted for specialised forces and for all officers in various occasions which calls for more formal or casual attire. The Traffic Police Department adopted a short-sleeved white tunic, dark blue breeches, a black leather Sam Browne belt, and riding boots for its officers performing mobile squad duties. A white crash helmet is worn when on the move, while a new dark blue jockey cap with chequered white and dark blue patterns around its circumference is worn when convenient while performing static duty. Members of the Vigilante Corps are also attired by a white short-sleeved top similar in design to the dark blue version for normal officers, gold-coloured buttons and badges, and a dark blue beret in place of the peaked cap.

Combat uniforms have also been adopted for specialist units such as those from the Special Operations Command and the Police Coast Guard (PCG), collectively known as the No. 4 uniforms. These involve the replacement of metal buttons with sewn-on plastic ones, the avoidance of all other metallic accruements which are deemed potentially hazardous to the officer or to others and the use of long-sleeved shirts.

The SPF introduced new uniforms made of 98% polyester and 2% spandex with better stretchable, perspiration absorption, and faster drying characteristics, as "part of ongoing efforts to improve officers' operational effectiveness and support them in their work". The word "police" is embroidered above the name tag of the new uniforms and the metallic buttons replaced with concealed plastic buttons for better comfort to allow officers put on the body vests over their uniforms. Riveted buttons are also fixed on the shoulders to allow the attachment of a body worn camera.

== Ranks ==
The following rank structure is used throughout the police force:

Ranks of the Singapore Police Force
Rank	Commissioner of Police (CP)	Deputy Commissioner of Police (DCP)	Senior Assistant Commissioner of Police (SAC)	Assistant Commissioner of Police (AC)	Deputy Assistant Commissioner of Police (DAC)	Superintendent of Police (SUPT)	Deputy Superintendent of Police (DSP)
Insignia							
Rank	Assistant Superintendent of Police (ASP)	Inspector (INSP)	Station Inspector (SI)	Senior Staff Sergeant (SSS)	Sergeant (SGT)	Corporal (CPL)	Constable (PC/SC)
Insignia							

The rank of corporal (CPL) was abolished in 1972, but reinstated in 1976. In 1997, the location of all rank devices was shifted from the sleeves to the shoulder epaulets except for the Gurkha Contingent. Also in the same year, the station inspector rank insignia was changed from collar pips to a coat of arms of Singapore with upward-pointing chevrons above and an arc below, a design similar to that of the warrant officers of the Singapore Armed Forces, while the rank of senior station inspector (SSI) was also introduced. In 1998, the senior station inspector (2) (SSI(2)) rank was introduced, and changes were made to the SI, SSI, and SSI(2) rank designs. The rank of lance corporal was abolished in 2002. In 2006, the Gurkha Contingent adopted embroidered ranks as part of an overhaul of its combat dress, but are worn on the right chest pocket.

In July 2016, a revamped rank overhaul was done with the retirement of the ranks of staff sergeant, senior station inspector (1) and senior station inspector (2), as well as the abolishment of the separation line between junior officers and senior officers, to unify a unified rank-scheme. In addition, the sergeant rank has three different grades noted by a number from 1 to 3 placed in parentheses and suffixed to the rank abbreviation; namely, SGT(1), SGT(2), and SGT(3).

=== Former ranks ===
Rank	Senior station inspector (2)	Senior station inspector (1)	Staff sergeant	Chief inspector	Lance corporal	Police constable
Insignia						
Notes	Abolished in 2016	Abolished in 2016	Abolished in 2016	Abolished for all apart from the Gurkha Contingent.	Abolished in 2002 for all apart from the Gurkha Contingent.	

== Equipment ==
=== Weapons ===
Police officers in the various divisions are armed when conducting regular uniformed patrols and plainclothes duties. Officers from different units are issued with different weapons.

In 2015, the SPF purchased a number of CZ P-07 semi-automatic pistols. From 2016, selected officers were issued with the pistols as a trial. In 2019, it was announced that the Glock 19 was chosen as a replacement to the Taurus revolver. From 2025 onwards, the Glock 19 pistol featuring a factory lever thumb safety is the standard issued sidearm of the Singapore Police Force with 30 rounds of ammunition for both regulars and PNSFs. In addition to the use of the handguns, the police also use the Heckler & Koch MP5 sub-machine gun and the Remington 870 shotgun.

Extendable batons were initially used by specialist units such as Security Command and Special Operations Command, however, it has since been used by officers from other front-line units, replacing the Monadnock PR-21 side-handle baton. Sabre Red pepper spray canisters are exclusively equipped to the officers of Police Coast Guard and Police Tactical Unit. A pair of handcuffs is issued to the officers as restraints.

The Taser X26E stun gun was procured in the late 2000s and is part of the officers' equipment, which provides another non-lethal means of subduing suspects. Despite safety concerns due to incidents experienced by foreign police forces, the weapon was deemed suitable for use by trained personnel, and was rolled out across other NPCs. In 2018, the Taser X26E was replaced with the X26P model.

Model	Image	Variants	Calibre	Origin	Notes	References
Pistols
CZ 75		CZ P-07	9x19mm Parabellum	Czech Republic	Currently on limited trials with selected regular officers.	
Glock		Glock 19 (Gen 5)	9x19mm Parabellum	Austria	Standard issue for all regular and PNSF officers. To replace the Taurus Model 85.	
SIG Sauer		SIG Sauer P226 Legion	9x19mm Parabellum	Germany/Switzerland	Used exclusively by the Special Tactics and Rescue unit of the Special Operations Command	
Heckler & Koch USP		USP Compact	9x19mm Parabellum	Germany	Used by the Police Tactical Unit of the Special Operations Command and Criminal Investigation Department	
Sphinx 3000		Sphinx 3000	9×19mm Parabellum	Switzerland	Used exclusively by the Special Tactics and Rescue unit of the Special Operations Command	
Taurus Model 85		Model 85	.38 Special	Brazil	Phased out for regular officers and PNSFs. However, it continues to be a standard issue sidearm for officers of the Special Constabulary (Operationally Ready National Servicemen) and Volunteer Special Constabulary.	
Shotguns
Remington 870		870 MCS 870 Police Magnum	12 gauge	USA	Used by Gurkha Contingent, the Police Coast Guard's Special Task Squadron and the Special Tactics and Rescue of the Special Operations Command.	
Benelli M3			12 gauge	Italy	Used by the Special Task Squadron of the Police Coast Guard.	
Submachine Guns
Heckler & Koch MP5		MP5A3 MP5A2 MP5K-PDW	9x19mm Parabellum	Germany	Standard sub-machine gun used by Protective Security Command, the Police Security Command, the Police Coast Guard, Special Operations Command and divisional Emergency Response Teams	
Angstadt Arms MDP-9		MDP-9 Gen 2	9x19mm Parabellum	USA	Angstadt Arms to supply 2100 MDP-9s, 650 FX training variants, including suppressors and integrated support and logistics to the SPF for a 3-year period.	
Assault Rifles
FN SCAR		FN MK 16 CQC FN MK 16 LB	5.56×45mm NATO	Belgium	Standard assault rifle used by Gurkha Contingent, Police Security Command and the Special Operations Command	
Next Generation Rifle System		POF-USA Renegade	.300 AAC Blackout	USA	Used by STAR	
Colt M4 Advanced Piston Carbine		Colt LE6940P	5.56×45mm NATO	USA	Used by the Police Coast Guard and the Protective Security Command.	
SAR 21		SAR21	5.56×45mm NATO	Singapore	Used as a ceremonial rifle by the Police Guard-of-Honour Contingent for National Day Parades.	
M16		M16S1	5.56×45mm NATO	USA/Singapore	Phased out from frontline use. Currently used for ceremonial purposes only.	
Machine Guns
FN MAG		STK MAG 60.20	7.62×51mm NATO	Belgium	Used by the Gurkha Contingent and the Police Coast Guard. Mounted on PCG boats.	
FN Minimi		Minimi Para	5.56×45mm NATO	Belgium	Used by Gurkha Contingent.	
STK 50MG		STK 50MG	.50 BMG	Singapore	Used by PCG. Mounted on STK ADDER RCWS onboard Patrol Interdiction Boats and other PCG boats.	
M2 Browning		FN M2HB-QCB	.50 BMG	USA	Used by PCG. Mounted on STK ADDER RCWS onboard Patrol Interdiction Boats.	
Sniper Rifles
Accuracy International Arctic Warfare		Arctic Warfare Police	7.62×51mm NATO	UK	Used by STAR and Gurkha Contingent snipers.	
Grenade Launchers
Heckler & Koch HK69A1		HK69A1	40 mm grenade	Germany	Used by Police Tactical Unit of the Police Special Operations Command.	
Autocannons
M242 Bushmaster		Mk 38 Mod 2	25 mm caliber	USA	Used by the Police Coast Guard. Mounted on the Typhoon Weapon Station onboard PCG boats.	
20mm Oerlikon			20mm caliber	Switzerland	Used by the Police Coast Guard. Mounted onboard PCG boats.	
Non-Lethals
TASER X26		X26P	Electrodes	USA	Use by the Ground Response Force.	

==== Retired Weapons ====
- Sterling Mk IV SMG
- Sten Mk IV SMG
- Lee-Enfield No.4 Mk II bolt-action rifle and jungle carbine
- FN FAL / L1A1 Self-Loading Rifle
- Webley Mk IV .38 revolver
- Uzi SMG
- Mini Uzi carbine
- Federal Riot Gun
- Smith and Wesson Model 36 3" Revolver and 2" Hammer Shroud Revolver
- H&K P7 (limited use)
- Browning HP (limited use)
- Glock 34 (Police Shooting Team circa 1995)
- CP Truncheon
- M1 Carbine

=== Vehicles ===
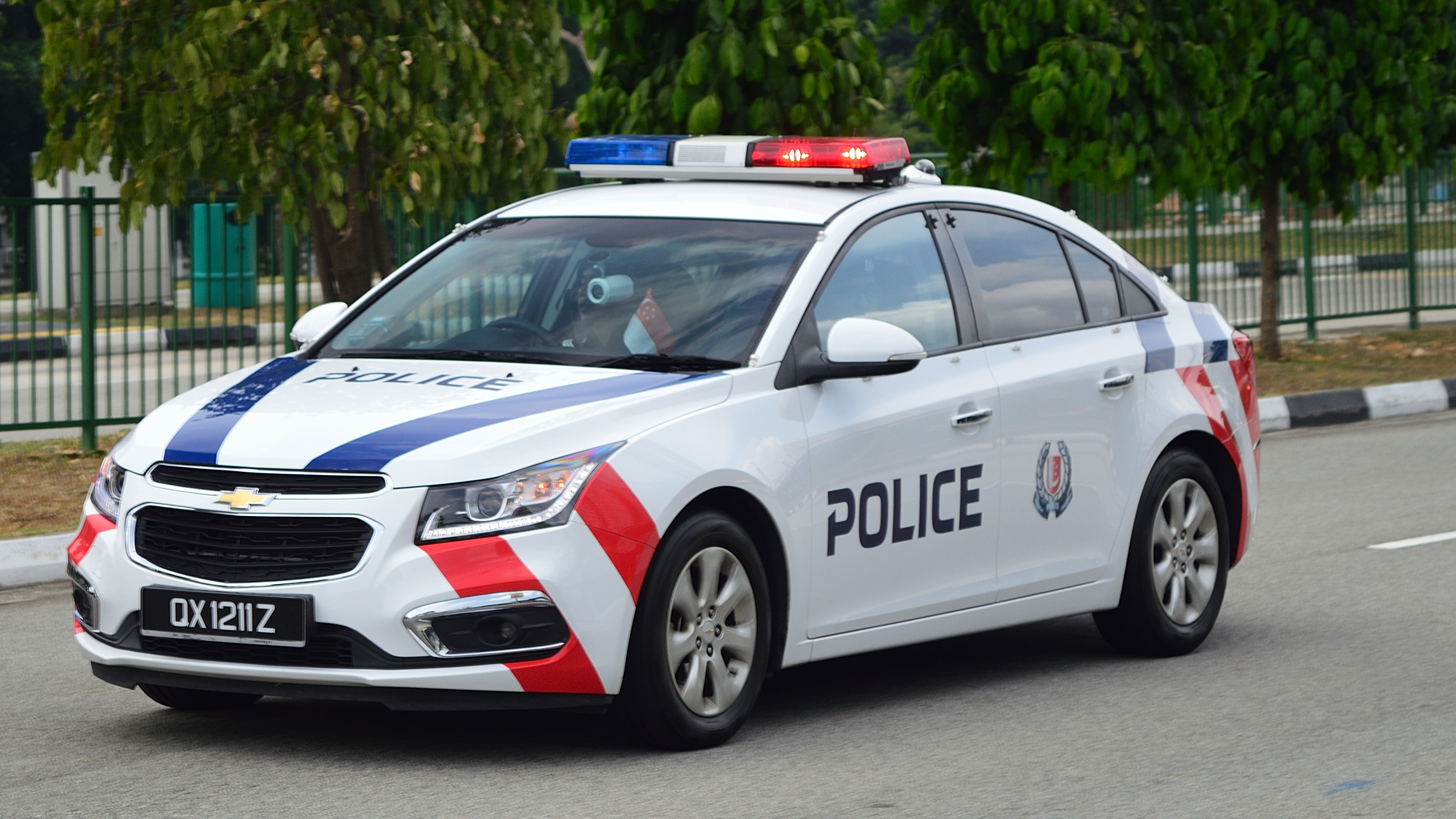
Chevrolet Cruze Fast Response

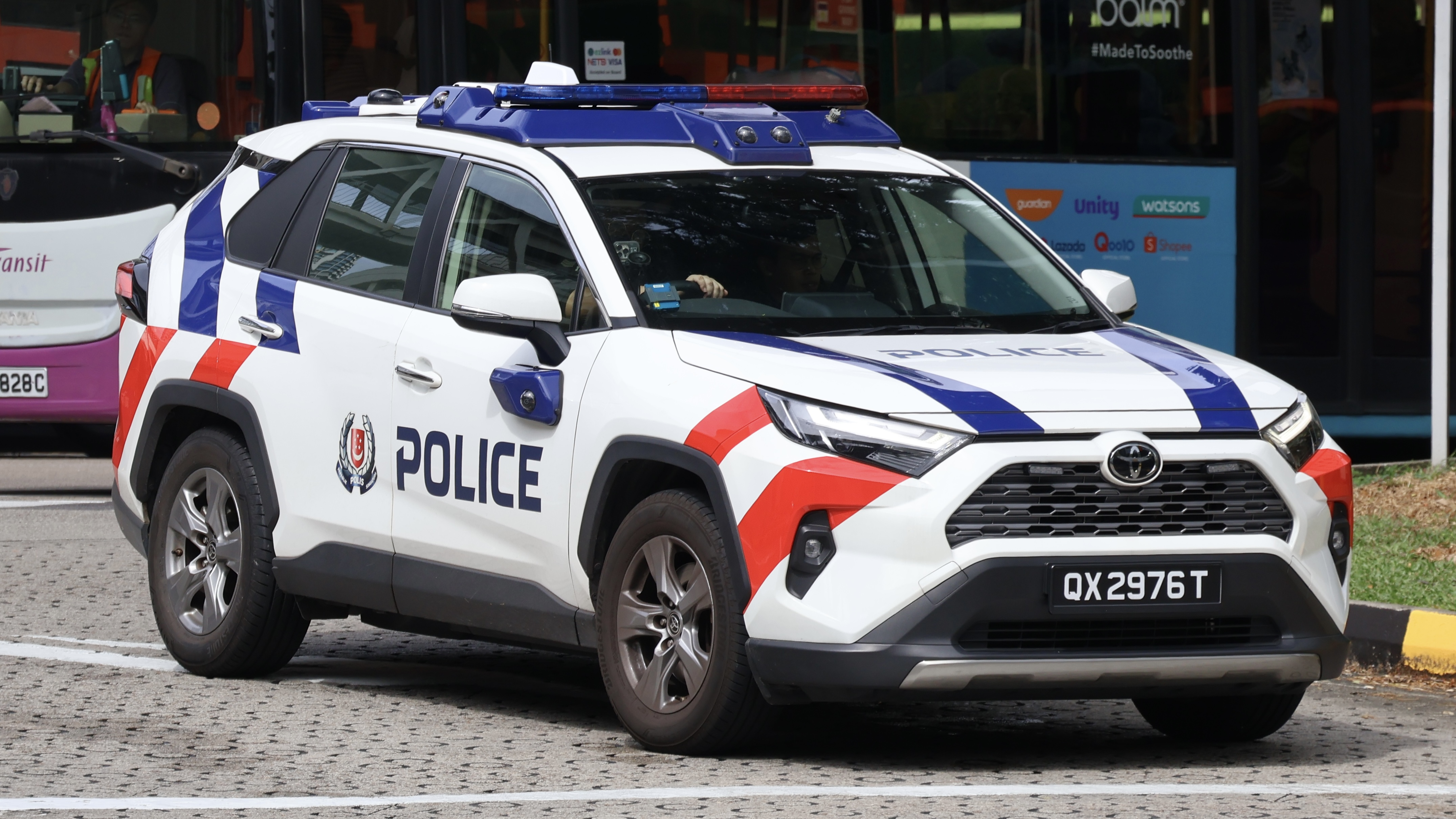
Toyota RAV4

Land division officers typically patrol and respond to calls in vehicles known as the Fast Response Car (FRC). Car models that have been used by the SPF include the Subaru Impreza TS 1.6.

In 2005, the SPF introduced the new Fast Response Vehicle (FRV), consisting of modified Toyota Hi-Lux sport utility vehicles with a back compartment to carry equipment.

In 2009, the SPF introduced Forward Command Vehicles. These were replaced in 2017 by Division Command Vehicles with greater mobility designed to enhance command, control and coordination. In addition, the SPF introduced new unmanned aerial vehicles with red and blue siren lights, a searchlight, a high-definition camera and an audio warning system. The UAVs are controlled by two-man teams (consisting of a pilot and a safety officer) and are designed to conduct search and rescue operations, attending public order incidents, traffic management, hostage situations and crowd monitoring.

Police from the Community Policing Units may also patrol in residential neighbourhoods on bicycles. At the 2007 Singapore National Day Parade, the Singapore Police Force unveiled a Tenix S600 APC (Armored Personnel Carrier) had been purchased for its operations for the Special Operations Command, and in NDP 2015, the Achleitner HMV Survivor and the Gurkha MPV by Terradyne Armored Vehicles Inc was unveiled.

The SPF on 29 March 2026 had also introduced a new fleet of vehicles for responding to major incidents. The new tactical strike vehicles come with a riot control system that includes a long-range acoustic device to disperse crowds, and a pair of grenade launchers which fire non-lethal munitions. The water cannon vehicles, commissioned in December 2025, come with enhanced features such as independent targeting cameras on the water monitors, which allow operators to identify targets more accurately.

The various specialist units may also make use of other specialised equipment specific to their scope of duty

Other vehicles used by the various units include:

==== Land Divisions ====
Make and Model	Types	In service	Notes
BMW F30 325d M Sport	Saloon	2018–present	Only used by the Traffic Police Expressway Patrol Unit
Chevrolet Cruze NB 1.6D	Saloon	2016–present	
Chevrolet Captiva 2.4 LT	Crossover SUV	2015–present	
Ford Everest UR	SUV	2010–present	
Hyundai Avante HD 1.6	Saloon	2010–present	
Hyundai Elantra MD 1.6	Saloon	2014–present	
Hyundai Sonata NF 2.0	Saloon	2011–present	
Hyundai TL Tucson FL 1.6 GLS	Crossover SUV	2020–present	Next-Generation Fast Response Car
Hyundai Santa Fe	Crossover SUV	2018–present	Used by ERT(Emergency Response Team)
Mazda 3 1.5 Skyactiv-G	Sedan	2020–present	Currently only used for follow-up investigations.
Subaru Impreza GD	Saloon	2006–present	Currently only used for follow-up investigations.
Toyota Corolla Altis 1.6 (E120)	Saloon	2005–present	Currently only used for follow-up investigations.
Toyota Corolla Altis 1.6 (E140)	Saloon	2009–present	
Toyota Corolla (E110)	Saloon	2002–present	Only used for follow-up investigations.
Toyota RAV4 2.0	Crossover SUV	2022–present	Next-Generation Fast Response Car
Volvo S80 T5 2.0	Saloon	2012–present	Only used by the Traffic Police Expressway Patrol Unit

==== Police Security Command ====
- Volvo XC60 – SUV
- Volvo S90 – Saloon
- Volvo S80 – Saloon
- Mitsubishi Pajero – SUV

==== Traffic Police ====
- BMW R1250RT-P – Motorcycle
- Yamaha Diversion XJ900P – Motorcycle
- Volvo S80 – Saloon
- Subaru Impreza – Saloon
- BMW 325d – Saloon
- Iveco Daily – Van
- Polestar 2 -Liftback

==== Special Operations Command ====
Make and Model	Type	In service	Notes
Tenix Defence S600	APC	2006–present	Used by Special Tactics and Rescue Unit.
Achleitner Tactical Strike Vehicle	APC	2022–present	Used by Special Operations Command
Mercedes-Benz Atego 1023A	Lorry	2019–present	Used by Police Tactical Unit
MAN TGA 26.320	Lorry	2010–present	Forward Command Vehicle.
Mercedes-Benz Sprinter 516 CDI	Van	2015–present	Used by Police Tactical Unit and Special Tactics and Rescue.
Mercedes-Benz Sprinter 416 CDI	Van	2010–present	Used by Police Dog Unit
Toyota Land Cruiser	SUV	2010–present	Used by Police Tactical Unit
Mitsubitshi Pajero	SUV	2010–present	Used by Special Tactics and Rescue
BMW F800 GS	Motorcycle	2016–present	Used by Rapid Deployment Troops

==== Gurkha Contingent ====
Make and Model	Type	In service	Notes
Terradyne Armored Vehicles Gurkha MPV	APC	2015–present	
Franz-Achleitner HMV Survivor I	APC	2015–present	
Land Rover Defender Bullfighter	APC	2013–present	Anti-riot van.

=== Defunct divisions and establishments ===
- Old Police Academy (01°19′47″N 103°50′11″E) – vacated in 2006, relocated to Old Choa Chu Kang Road as part of the Home Team Academy, leaving behind the Police National Service provost unit and Traffic Police driving test school. The accommodation barracks and training facilities of the Old Police academy currently houses the training departments for all auxiliary police forces in Singapore.
- Geylang Police Division (01°19′35″N 103°53′26″E) defunct 'C' Division HQ – closed and vacated in 2000, areas of responsibility was divided between 'A', 'F' & 'G' Divisions. Station's status – Currently in use by Geylang NPC under 'G' Bedok Police Division and by Public Transport Security Command.
- Toa Payoh Police Division (01°20′23″N 103°51′0″E) defunct 'B' Division HQ – closed and vacated in 1988, areas of responsibility was divided between 'E' & 'F' Divisions. Station was refurbished and is currently in use by Security Command.
- Police Radio Division (01°16′59″N 103°50′29″E) defunct "R" Division. Responsible for dispatching quick response "R" Division cars. Closed in the 1990s.

=== Land Divisions ===
- Beach Road Police Station (01°17′50″N 103°51′26″E) – former site of 'A' Division HQ, vacated in 2000.
- Eu Tong Sen Street Police Station (01°16′59″N 103°50′29″E) – former HQ site of CAD, CID & VSC since 1994, vacated in 2001 and was transferred to the charge of SLA. Station status pending.
- Joo Chiat Police Station (01°18′19″N 103°54′15″E) – former site of 'G' Division HQ, vacated in 1987 and was transferred to the charge of SLA, which in turn released the premises for use by private developers.
- Old Hill Street Police Station (01°17′26.61″N 103°50′53.31″E) – vacated in 1980, this old police station and barracks was renovated in 1983 and became part of MCCY and MCI.
- Paya Lebar Police Station (01°21′06″N 103°52′34″E) – former site of 'F' Division HQ, vacated in 1987, now became 2nd Division HQ SCDF.
- Queenstown Police Station (01°17′49″N 103°47′58″E) – former site of 'D' Division HQ, vacated in 1988, now became 1st Division HQ SCDF.
- Orchard Police Station – former site of 'E' Division HQ, demolished in 1983, now became ION Orchard and Orchard MRT station.
- Old Tanglin Police Station (01°18′21″N 103°49′20″E) – former site of 'E' Division HQ, vacated in 2001, now became Interpol Global Complex for Innovation.
- Taman Jurong Police Station (01°19′38″N 103°43′14″E) – vacated in 1980 and demolished in 1988, the surrounding land at the site has been redeveloped as a HDB housing precinct.
- Old Clementi Police Station - former site of 'D' Division HQ, vacated in 2023, now became Clementi MRT station (CRL Construction). Relocated to replace the former ITE College West campus at Clementi, which was also vacated by 2010.

=== Neighbourhood police posts ===
- Ama Keng Neighbourhood Police Post (01°24′12″N 103°42′5″E) sited directly across the road from Ama Keng Chinese Temple in Lim Chu Kang, the station was closed and demolished in 1980.
- Bukit Panjang Neighbourhood Police Post (old)
- Pasir Panjang Neighbourhood Police Post (old) (01°17′30″N 103°46′6″E) – closed and vacated in 1986 following the inauguration of Pasir Panjang NPP and West Coast NPP. It was demolished in 1991.
- Woodlands Neighbourhood Police Post (01°26′38″N 103°46′13″E) – closed in 1999 (located within the old Woodlands Checkpoint building since 1980), Woodlands Neighbourhood Police Centre has since taken over its duty.
- Kranji Neighbourhood Police Post (01°26′10″N 103°45′3″E) – closed and vacated in 1997 following the inauguration of Yew Tee NPP, building was demolished for land clearing to build factory.
- River Valley Neighbourhood Police Post - closed in 2024
- Bukit Panjang North Neighbourhood Police Post - closed in 2024
- Tiong Bahru Neighbourhood Police Post - closed in 2024
- Mountbatten Neighbourhood Police Post - closed in 2024
- MacPherson Neighbourhood Police Post - closed in 2024
- Hong Kah South Neighbourhood Police Post - closed in 2024

=== Neighbourhood police centres ===
- Woodlands West Neighbourhood Police Centre – closed in 2018 and merged with the new Woodlands Police Division building
- Bedok South Neighbourhood Police Centre - closed in 31 January 2022 due to COVID-19 pandemic and merged into Bedok NPC (renamed from Bedok North NPC). It will be renamed to Bedok South NPP.
- Yishun South Neighbourhood Police Centre - closed in 18 December 2024 and merged into Yishun NPC (renamed from Yishun North NPC). It will be renamed to Khatib NPP.
- Bukit Panjang Neighbourhood Police Centre - closed in 23 November 2025 and merged into Bukit Batok NPC. It will be renamed to Bukit Panjang NPP.
- Bukit Timah Neighbourhood Police Centre - closed in 25 May 2026 and merged into Kampong Java NPC. It will be renamed to Dunearn NPP.
- Hougang Neighbourhood Police Centre - closed in 6 July 2026 and merged into Serangoon NPC. It will be renamed to Hougang West NPP.

=== Police Coast Guard ===
- Kallang Regional Base (01°18′15″N 103°52′16″E) – vacated in 2007, relocated to Brani Regional Base at Pulau Brani, now occupied by National Cadet Corps (Sea) Kallang Sea Training Centre.
- Jurong Regional Base (01°18′31″N 103°42′39″E) – vacated in 1999, relocated to Gul Regional Base, base was demolished to make way for the Jurong Island Highway.
- Pulau Sakeng Police Post (01°12′36″N 103°46′41″E) – closed and vacated in 1987 after the last islander left, the island was subsumed by the land reclamation process of the nearby Pulau Semakau. The Semakau landfill receiving station was built on top of the island after the reclamation process.
- Seletar Regional Base – vacated in 2005, relocated to Loyang Regional Base, base was demolished to make way for the Seletar Aerospace Park.

== Dealing with offences committed by officers ==
Police officers are governed by the Police Force Act (Chapter 235) and its Police Regulations (Chapter 235, Section 28 and 117) of the Singapore Statutes. The disciplinary offences can be found in its schedule. Misfeasance and malfeasance such as blue wall of silence, conduct prejudicial to good order and discipline, corruption, misconduct and malicious prosecution are referred to the Internal Affairs Office (IAO). The Attorney-General's Chambers (AGC) can be consulted to advise the police on its disciplinary proceedings. Police officers can whistleblow their colleagues' official misconducts and wrongdoings by filing official police reports themselves to officially open investigation papers against other officers. Full-time police national servicemen are also subjected to the Police (Special Constabulary) Regulations (Chapter 235, Section 85).

SPF HQ spokesperson routinely issues official statements stating that its officers are not only expected to uphold the law, but also to maintain the highest standards of conduct and integrity. The spokesperson added that SPF deals severely with officers who break the law, including charging them in court. Also, SPF usually commence disciplinary proceedings against the officers involved, and as well as suspend them pending internal investigations.

=== Notable cases ===
In March 1976, one of Singapore's top prominent senior lawyers, Subhas Anandan, was arrested by a corrupt policeman for suspected involvement in a secret society under the Criminal Law (Temporary Provisions) Act. He was remanded without trial in a prison for a few months. Subhas was exonerated and acquitted in November of the same year, following an investigation probe by the Corrupt Practices Investigation Bureau.

On 10 July 2013, ex-policeman Senior Staff Sergeant Iskandar Rahmat — a 14-year veteran award-winning investigation officer — killed a car workshop owner and the man's son, and has since been on the death row from 2017 onward, after failing in his appeal and president clemency against the death sentence. The case was known as the Kovan double murders in Singapore media. On 5 February 2025, Iskandar was executed after his appeals to court & clemency to the president unsuccessful.

On 21 July 2023, police sergeant Uvaraja Gopal committed suicide following workplace harassment and racial discrimination. He had a history of mentally unstable behaviour, leading to him being relieved of carrying firearms in February 2023. He was being investigated after allegedly assaulting his brother a few days prior, and a report was filed by his mother saying she feared for her safety. The case garnered national attention and outrage, with calls for an independent inquiry due to beliefs of a coverup.

== Media outreach efforts ==
Through the Public Affairs Department, SPF has collaborated with the media industry to produce content that supports and promote the mission and brand of the organisation.

Books

- In the service of the nation, 1985
- 999: True Cases from the CID, 1987
- Service to the Nation: 50 years of the Volunteer Special Constabulary, 1998
- Policing Singapore in the 19th & 20th centuries, 2002
- Justice is Done, 2005
- The Adventures of Constable Acai, 1987: A series of crime stories, based on actual crimes from police files were compiled into storybooks from the popular children's magazine Young Generation, about the adventures of a fictional policeman named Constable Acai. They were written by officers from the Crime Prevention Department to instill crime awareness in children during the '80s through to the mid-'90s. The other books in this series are as below:
  - More Adventures of Constable Acai, 1989
  - Constable Acai Fights Crime, 1996
  - Justice is Done 2, 2022

Novels

- Operation Firestorm, 1997

Periodicals

- Singapore Police Magazine
- Police Life, 1971 to present
- Police Life Annual

Television programs

- Documentary
  - Crimewatch, 1986–Current
  - True Files, 2002–2007
- Drama Series
  - Seletar Robbery (实里达大劫案), 1982
  - CID '83, 1983
  - First Step (踏上征途), 1986: On women in the police force
  - Patrol (铁警雄风), 1989: A take on the lives of the men in the Traffic Police Department
  - Private Eyes (妙探智多星), 1991
  - Ladies in action (霹雳红唇), 1992
  - Crime and Passion (執法先鋒), 1992
  - Lethal Duo (天使追辑令), 1994
  - Dr Justice (法医故事), 1994
  - Neighbourhood Heroies (大英雄小人物), 1995
  - Triple Nine, 1995–1998: On the adventures of a CID team.
  - Secret Files (机密档案), 1995
  - The Shadow Mission (地下猎人), 1995
  - The Dragons Five (飞龙五将), 1995
  - Dr Justice II (法医故事II), 1996
  - City Cops (警网双雄), 1996
  - Of Cops And Men (城市双雄), 1996
  - Pursuit of Justice (石破天惊), 1997
  - Act 235 (刑事235), 1998
  - Dare To Strike (扫冰者), 14 November 2000: the phrase "Dare to Strike" is the motto of the Central Narcotics Bureau
  - The Reunion (顶天立地), 26 December 2001
  - Heartlanders, 2002–2005: On two Neighbourhood Police Centre officers
  - True Heroes (真心英雄), 5 May 2003: Revolves around the daily lives of three Neighbourhood Police Centre officers
  - The Frontline (家在前线), 2003: This fictional six-part TV show depicts how Singaporeans cope after the German mastermind of a neo-anarchist organisation sets off a bomb at a naval base as an anti-imperialistic statement against Singapore's ties with the United States. It showcases the capabilities of the Singapore Police Force and the Singapore Armed Forces to deal with terrorism. Many technologies introduced in this series has never been before shown to the public. It is also the only local television series to date to accurately depict the Police's elite Special Tactics and Rescue (STAR) team and the Army's Special Operations Forces (SOF) although the latter unit was never addressed by name in the show. They were instead referred to as "The Commandos".
  - When the Time Comes (一线之间), 2004
  - The Crime Hunters (心网追凶), 2004
  - Police & Thief, 2004–2010
  - Life Line, 2005–2007
  - Zero to Hero (阴差阳错), 2005
  - Without Warning, 2006
  - The Undisclosed (迷云二十天), 2006
  - C.I.D. (刑警2人组), 12 June 2006
  - Metamorphosis (破茧而出), 18 September 2007
  - Crime Busters x 2 (叮当神探), 30 September 2008
  - Unriddle (最火搭档), 2010
  - Vettai : Pledged to Hunt (வேட்டை), 23 November 2010 – 30 March 2011
  - C.L.I.F. (警徽天职), 2011: First drama to be produced in close collaboration with the Singapore Police Force. The second, third, fourth, and fifth seasons were aired in 2013, 2014, September 2016 and September 2019 respectively.
  - Unriddle 2 (最火搭档2), 2012
  - Vettai 2.0: The Next Generation (வேட்டை 2.0), 4 January 2012 – 11 May 2013
  - Vettai 3: The Final Judgement (வேட்டை 3), 17 November 2014 – present
    - Mata-Mata Season 1, 2013: background post-World War II in Singapore and establish woman police
    - Mata-Mata Season 2, 2014: A New Era, background after separation Singapore from Malaysia and secret society '70s
    - Mata-Mata Season 3, 2015: A New Generation, background development Singapore and crime late '70s, early '80s and now

Movies

- The Last Blood (驚天十二小時), 1991
- Ace Cops (妙警点三八), 1996: Telemovie
- Life on the Line (魂断四面佛), 1996: Telemovie
- 2000 AD (公元2000), 1999
- After School (放学后), 2004: A film released by the National Crime Prevention Council to harness the power of cinema as a public education tool to reach out to young Singaporeans and their families.

== See also ==
- List of Singapore police officers killed in the line of duty
- List of major crimes in Singapore
- Crime in Singapore
- Project Griffin
- Law enforcement in Singapore
- List of law enforcement agencies
- Internal Security Department
- Corrupt Practices Investigation Bureau
