= Woodlands Police Division =

Division of the Singapore Police Force

Coordinates: 1°25′59.28″N 103°46′44.62″E

The Woodlands Police Division (or 'L' Division) is one of the seven, and the most recent, land divisions of the Singapore Police Force. The headquarters of this division began operations on 25 November 2018 at a newly constructed building along Woodlands Street 12.

Woodlands Division comprises five Neighbourhood Police Centres (NPC) and four Neighbourhood Police Posts (NPP). The five NPCs are Woodlands West, Woodlands East, Yishun North, Yishun South and Sembawang. Located in the north of Singapore, Woodlands Division serves residents living and working in Woodlands, Sembawang and Yishun. It also oversees policing resources at Woodlands Checkpoint and Tuas Checkpoint until the Immigration and Checkpoints Authority (ICA) took over all policing resources on 3 January 2023.

== History ==
In view of the growing population size in the north as well as the expanding developments of retail spaces and transport nodes, there was an increasing need for greater policing services in the region. Construction works began on 22 November 2015, and the new division headquarters started operations on 25 November 2018. Woodlands West NPC and Woodlands East NPC, which were formerly under Jurong Police Division, together with Yishun North NPC, Yishun South NPC and Sembawang NPC from Ang Mo Kio Police Division has since become under the jurisdiction of this newly formed division.

== Establishments ==
- Woodlands Division HQ
  - Woodlands West Neighbourhood Police Centre
    - Marsiling Neighbourhood Police Post (e-kiosk)
  - Woodlands East Neighbourhood Police Centre
  - Yishun Neighbourhood Police Centre
    - Chong Pang Neighbourhood Police Post
    - Khatib Neighbourhood Police Post
    - Nee Soon South Neighbourhood Police Post
  - Sembawang Neighbourhood Police Centre

The Enforcement Division (Woodlands) of the Central Narcotics Bureau is also located within the same premise of the division headquarters.
