= Police Intelligence Department =

Law enforcement agency in Singapore

Coordinates: 1°19′27.56″N 103°50′43.24″E

- Abbreviation: PID

Jurisdictional structure
- National agency: Singapore
- Operations jurisdiction: Singapore
- Primary governing body: Government of Singapore
- Secondary governing body: Singapore Police Force
- General nature: Civilian police

Operational structure
- Overseen by: Ministry of Home Affairs
- Headquarters: Singapore
- Elected officers responsible: K. Shanmugam, Coordinating Minister for National Security & Minister for Home Affairs; Edwin Tong, 2nd Minister for Home Affairs; Muhammad Faishal Ibrahim, Senior Minister of State for Home Affairs; Sim Ann, Senior Minister of State for Home Affairs; Goh Pei Ming, Minister of State for Home Affairs
- Agency executives: SAC Shee Tek Tze, Director Police Intelligence Department; AC Allan Yue, Deputy Director (Operations & Development); AC Ivan Goh Wee Khern, Deputy Director (Collection); Kua Choon Jin, Deputy Director (Research) concurrent Deputy Director (Operational Analysis) (Covering)

Website
- https://www.police.gov.sg/Who-We-Are/Organisation-Structure/Specialist-Staff-Departments/Police-Intelligence-Department

The Police Intelligence Department (PID) is the national staff police intelligence department of the Singapore Police Force (SPF). Its primary purpose is to collate and analyse information obtained from the various departments of the SPF, as well as other sources, to support law enforcement activities in Republic of Singapore.

The department is also the staff authority on matters relating to counterintelligence within the SPF, crimes intelligence gathering in the SPF, intelligence-led counterterrorism, and serving as the police intelligence liaison with Interpol and law enforcement agencies in neighboring countries.

== History ==
On 1 April 1973, the Criminal Intelligence Unit (Abbreviation: CIU) was set up within the Criminal Investigation Department (Abbreviation: CID) to support CID's investigation efforts. It was then realised that there was a tremendous amount of valuable information that can be obtained from the land divisions. In October 1988, the Intelligence Division was set up within the CID following a reorganisation of the CIU structure.

On 28 March 1996, the Intelligence Division was upgraded to a full-fledged department in the SPF, marking the division's progress and reflecting its value and contribution in the fight against crimes. Past directors include Hoong Wee Teck, who is the incumbent Police Commissioner.

== Present Day ==
Key contact numbers, with an international dialling code of +(65), remain offered by the Singapore Police Force as they were:

- Emergencies 999
- Police Hotline 1800 - 255 0000
- Traffic Hotline 6 547 0000
