= Airport Police Division =

Singaporean airport police unit

The Airport Police Division (APD) is the airport police unit of the Singapore Police Force. It has jurisdiction and responsibility for the maintenance of law and order within Singapore Changi Airport, Seletar Airport, Changi Airfreight Centre and Airport Logistics Park of Singapore. The APD also administers the National Civil Aviation Security Programme, National Civil Aviation Security Training Programme, and National Civil Aviation Security Quality Control Programme.

APD works closely with the government agencies such as the Ministry of Transport, Civil Aviation Authority of Singapore, and Immigration & Checkpoints Authority, as well as companies operating in or around the airport such as Changi Airport Group, airline operators, and ground handling agencies.

The APD was formed as the Airport Police Division on 1 November 1970 when the Singapore Police Force took on responsibility for airport security at Paya Lebar Airport. In 1981, airport operations - and the APD as well - moved to Changi Airport. In April 2000, APD shifted to a new police station to make way for the construction of Terminal 3.

APD works alongside SPF's Protective Security Command (ProCom) to ensure the safety of civilians, and maintain law and order within Singapore Changi Airport.

As of 2024, the APD is led by its Commander AC Malathi Muthu Veran and Deputy Commander AC Dominic John Baptist.
