= Neighbourhood police post =

Type of police station in Singapore

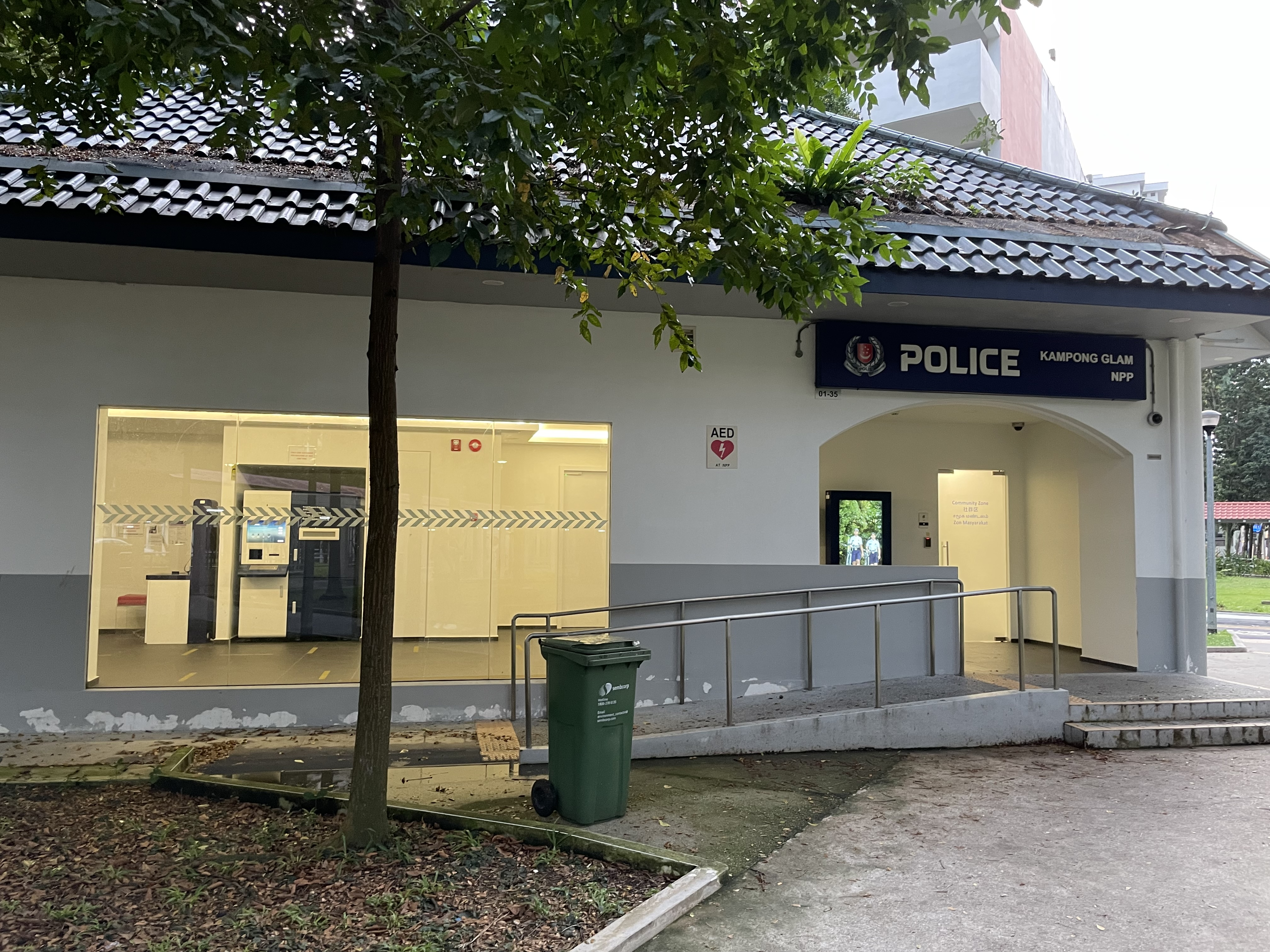
The Kampong Glam NPP.

A neighbourhood police post (Abbreviation: NPP; Malay: Pondok Kejiranan Polis) is a small police station in Singapore modelled after the Japanese kōban system, whereby police presence is enhanced in the neighbourhoods with the aid of a high number of smaller police establishments.

== History ==
To tackle crime rates in Singapore, Prime Minister Lee Kuan Yew suggested that the Japanese Kōban system be studied. Wong Kan Seng proposed the establishment of Neighbourhood Police Posts (NPPs) in Singapore.

In 1982, three officers from the Japanese National Police Agency arrived in Singapore to help with setting up NPPs in the country. The first NPPs were to be set up in Toa Payoh by July 1983 with an evaluation phase starting from October 1983.

In 1986, there was a total of 34 NPPs with 57 more NPPs to be built leading to a total of 91 by 1989.

In 1997, Wong announced a restructuring of the neighbourhood policing system with the creation of the neighbourhood police centre (NPC) and reducing the number of NPPs from 91 to 66. The NPP would be subsequently managed by the NPC.

In December 2013, a six-month pilot of automated NPPs, located at West Coast, Radin Mas and Marsiling, was announced. The automated NPP has video conferencing ability, automated drop-boxes for lost-and-found property, and tablets with various apps from government agencies for general public use.

In 2016, there was a total of 62 NPPs. In February 2024, the SPF announced that six NPPs are scheduled to be closed down, which include River Valley NPP, Bukit Panjang North NPP, Tiong Bahru NPP, MacPherson NPP, Mountbatten NPP and Hong Kah South NPP. It was subsequently announced that eight more NPPs will be constructed by 2025.

== Review ==
In 1986, crime rates in the Delta Constituency dropped by 53.5 percent after the opening of an NPP, with the decrease being attributed to its presence.
