= Protective Security Command =

Singapore counter terrorism police unit

Coordinates: 1°19′34.88″N 103°53′26.63″E

Protective Security Command Command
- Abbreviation: ProCom
- Motto: To Protect and Prevail

Agency overview
- Formed: 8 July 2016; 10 years ago
- Preceding agency: Key Installations National Service (KINS)

Jurisdictional structure
- Operations jurisdiction: Singapore
- Primary governing body: Government of Singapore
- Secondary governing body: Singapore Police Force

Operational structure
- Headquarters: 300 Ulu Pandan Road
- Elected officers responsible: K. Shanmugam, Coordinating Minister for National Security & Minister for Home Affairs; Edwin Tong, 2nd Minister for Home Affairs; Muhammad Faishal Ibrahim, Senior Minister of State for Home Affairs; Sim Ann, Senior Minister of State for Home Affairs; Goh Pei Ming, Minister of State for Home Affairs
- Agency executives: SAC Victor Ho, Commander ProCom; DAC Phoa Huilin, Deputy Commander ProCom
- Parent agency: Ministry of Home Affairs

The Protective Security Command (ProCom) is a specialist counter-terrorist police unit of the Singapore Police Force (SPF). ProCom was commissioned on 8 July 2016 to strengthen crime-fighting and counter-terrorism efforts by optimising National Service manpower. The unit has the largest group of full-time National Servicemen (NSFs) and Operationally Ready National Servicemen (NSmen) in the SPF.

ProCom's mission is to protect strategic events and locations during peacetime and national emergencies.

The predecessor of ProCom is the Police National Service Key Installations Command (KINS), established in October 1994 under the Police National Service Department.

== History ==
=== Key Installation Protection Units ===
In 1994, the Police National Service (PNS) System was reorganised. As part of the reorganisation, the PNS Key Installation Protection Units (KINS) was established to provide protection for vital installations. The role of KINS expanded as Singapore's security environment developed. In the aftermath of the September 11 attacks in 2001, KINS personnel were deployed for the first time as part of enhanced security measures.

On 1 November 2003, KINS became part of the Police National Service Department (PNSD), and in November 2004, the Police KINS Training Camp was established at the junction of Clementi Road and Ulu Pandan Road.

In 2013, the PNSD developed the PNS Master Plan to "enhance the operational effectiveness of PNS personnel". This development contributed to the planning of the establishment of a dedicated protective-security command.

=== Establishment and Development ===
On 8 July 2016, ProCom was commissioned as a new specialist line unit as an expansion of KINS. ProCom inherited KINS' key-installation protection role while developing a broader function including security sensitive locations, major national events and a national emergency response. By 2017, ProCom had more than 500 troopers in four Protective Security Units, where approximately 85 per cent are Police NSF personnel.

During the early 2020s, ProCom expanded its operational capabilities through changes to its training, NS structure and deployment arrangements.

Under Assistant Commissioner of Police (AC) Sherrin Chua (2022-2024), ProCom introduced Enhanced Tactical Training and integrated a 12-year National Service journey.

In October 2024, AC Victor Ho assumed command of the unit, succeeding Chua as Commander of ProCom.

== Operations ==
=== In-Situ Reaction Teams ===
In December 2017, ProCom established In-Situ Reaction Teams (IRTs) to complement existing Ground Response Forces and Emergency Response Teams in responding to public security incidents. ProCom officers who wished to join the IRT completed an additional three-week training on the usage of firearms and learning combat tactics. Thereafter, these teams were to be deployed at areas with large human congregations, such as Orchard Road and Marina Bay. IRT units were composed of both regular police officers and NSFs. Patrol teams were managed by Troop Officers-in-Charge.

=== Airport Security ===
ProCom officers have conducted high-visibility patrols at Changi Airport since 2020, alongside the Singapore Armed Forces personnel who had previously conducted patrols at the airport under Ops Bacinet. On 1 January 2023, ProCom and the Airport Police Division (APD) assumed full responsibility for this operation. The operation was subsequently renamed Ops Stinger Patrol.

=== Strategic Location Response ===
In June 2025, ProCom launched the unit's new Strategic Location Response (SLR) teams. Responsibilities of the Ops Stinger Patrol and IRTs were subsumed under SLR following the operationalisation of the new SLR teams. The SLR deployments involve specialised patrols at key locations of interest, including shopping centres and tourist attractions. These ProCom teams provide a visible security presence islandwide.

A ProCom Team in Charge (IC) leads a team of four officers during patrols across the island and is responsible for their deployment, welfare and response during incidents.

==== Drone Capabilities ====
SLR officers are equipped with additional capabilities to detect and respond to potential unmanned aerial vehicles that may be threats. For example, ProCom has deployed the Radio Frequency-based Jammer Gun that was developed jointly by the SPF and the Home Team Science and Technology Agency (HTX) as part of its counter-drone capabilities. The system can disrupt the radio-frequency control signals between an unauthorised drone and its operator, preventing the drone from continuing its flight under normal control.These capabilities allow ProCom officers to detect and respond to potential drone-related security threats encountered during their deployments.

==== Vehicle Capabilities ====
The teams also operate modified Land Rover Defender 110 vehicles. The modifications include 360-degree camera systems, multiple airbags and tyre-pressure monitoring systems. The vehicles also provide additional cabin space for operational equipment and officers wearing tactical equipment.

Image of ProCom Land Rover Defender, license plate QX5726D

=== Event Security ===
==== Elections ====
During the 2020 Singaporean general elections, ProCom was deployed at polling centres to ensure voter safety during islandwide polling. This continued for the 2023 Singapore Presidential Elections and the 2025 General Elections. ProCom officers worked alongside the Ground Response Force (GRF) officers to escort ballot carriers to the desginated areas for vote tallying.

==== Major Events ====
ProCom also provides security coverage at key national events, including the annual National Day Parade and the Formula 1 Grand Prix in Singapore. In particular, during the 2025 Singapore Grand Prix, ProCom personnel operated Person-Check Stations to screen for prohibited items and unauthorised persons entering the event premises.

Additionally, ProCom also deploys a counter-drone system at major events that includes a suite of detection sensors, such as electro-optical cameras, to obtain visual information on unauthorised drones operating within an area.

== Exercises ==
=== Exercise Fortress Major ===
In 2024, ProCom conducted Exercise Fortress Major, an exercise involving the mobilisation of PNSmen to protect identified Critical Physical Infrastructures (CPIs). It lasted for 45 hours and involved the protection of multiple CPIs.

The exercise involved simulated incidents such as a suspicious vehicle, person-borne improvised explosive devices (IEDs), diversionary incidents and a chemical agent attack.

=== Exercise Scorpius II ===
From 30 January to 1 February 2026, ProCom conducted Exercise Scorpius II, a three-day national emergency exercise involving more than 160 PNS and Full-time Police National Service (PNSF) officers. Personnel were activated through recall procedures and deployed to strategic locations as part of the exercise.

== Public Sector Engagement Group ==
In February 2021, ProCom launched the Public Security Engagement Group (PSEG), to facilitate collaboration between ProCom and organisations on protective security matters. PSEG was reported to have been working with more than 100 agencies and planned to engage approximately 200 organisations in 2021, such as Gardens by the Bay and the Singapore Wildlife Reserve. The group focuses on areas such as site security planning, surveillance coverage and emergency response preparedness.

== Organization ==
=== Manpower ===
ProCom leverages on three types of personnel:

1. Regular police officers,
2. Conscripted Police Full-Time National Servicemen (PNSFs), and
3. Operationally-Ready Police National Servicemen (NSMen).

ProCom provides leadership opportunities for PNSFs. Officers may be appointed as Team-in-Charge, where they lead teams of four officers during patrols.

=== Training ===
==== Basic Training ====
ProCom officers undergo the Protective Security Unit Basic Course (PSUBC), a five-week programme covering firearms handling, tactical movement, security searches and fighting in built-up areas. Training also includes event-security procedures, such as the use of hand-held metal detectors and searches of persons and vehicles, as well as scenario-based exercises involving suspicious persons and packages. Officers are also trained to respond to a range of security threats, including armed attacks, knife attacks and vehicle ramming incidents.

==== Further Training ====
ProCom regularly conducts simulated incident scenarios, with officers working with trainers to identify mistakes and improve their response.

The Training Branch provides further instruction in weapon handling, searches and tactical manoeuvres for engaging threats in urban environments. ProCom officers, including Operationally Ready Police National Servicemen (NSmen), also receive refresher training in Close Quarter Battle (CQB) and event security.

==== Specialised Training ====
ProCom has also introduced specialised training for its patrol operations.

===== IRT Training =====
ProCom officers joining the IRT previously completed another three-week course on firearm handling and specialised combat tactics.

===== Defensive Driving =====
In 2023, 350 ProCom officers were trained in defensive driving, covering areas such as lane discipline, driving on slopes and expressways, and anticipating and responding to road situations. The programme was intended to improve the competency of officers operating fast-response cars and police vans.

=== Equipment ===
ProCom officers are armed with the HK MP5 and the M4 carbine. Their sidearm is the Glock 19 Gen 5 pistol, which replaced the Taurus Model 85 in June 2021.

=== Uniform ===
ProCom officers wears dark blue, the organisational colour of the SPF, beige berets and dark shades.

== Incidents ==
=== Death of a Police National Serviceman ===
On 3 September 2018, a 23-year-old full-time police National Serviceman was found at ProCom's Ulu Pandan Road Camp with a gunshot wound to his head. He was taken to the National University hospital and passed away from his injuries several days later. The SPF classified the case as an unnatural death and stated that no foul play was suspected.

=== Unauthorised use of a police vehicle ===
On 19 March 2020, a 19 year old full-time police National Serviceman attached to ProCom's logistics support office was arrested after taking a police vehicle out without authorisation.
