= C.L.I.F. =

Singaporean TV series

- 警徽天职
- Genre: Police procedural Action/Thriller
- Created by: Phang Kai Yee
- Written by: Phang Kai Yee; Seah Choon Guan
- Directed by: Chia Mien Yang; Leong Lye Lin; Chong Liung Man
- Starring: Tay Ping Hui; Qi Yuwu; Joanne Peh; Chris Tong; Elvin Ng; Tracy Lee
- Opening theme: C.L.I.F. (警微天职) by Zheng Kai Hua
- Ending theme: (No commentaries for News Tonight)
- Country of origin: Singapore
- Original languages: Chinese, with some English dialogue
- No. of episodes: 20

Production
- Producer: Chia Mien Yang
- Running time: approx. 45 minutes

Original release
- Network: Mediacorp Channel 8
- Release: 31 May – 27 June 2011

Related
- C.L.I.F. 2 (2013); C.L.I.F. 3 (2014); C.L.I.F. 4 (2016); C.L.I.F. 5 (2019)

C.L.I.F. (Courage, Loyalty, Integrity, Fairness, or 警徽天职, commonly pronounced as cliff) is a police procedural series produced by Mediacorp Singapore in 2011 in collaboration with the Singapore Police Force. It was aired from 31 May to 27 June 2011 on free-to-air MediaCorp Channel 8 and consists of 20 episodes. The drama stars Tay Ping Hui, Qi Yuwu, Elvin Ng, Joanne Peh, Chris Tong, and Tracy Lee in the main roles with a large ensemble supporting cast. It was directed by Chong Liung Man, who previously directed another award-winning police procedural C.I.D., which also starred Tay and Qi in the lead roles as police officers.

This drama is also the second Mediacorp production to be filmed entirely at outdoor locations after Your Hand In Mine. Crime-prevention tips were shown during the credits but not shown in the repeat telecast.

The series went on to have another four installments, C.L.I.F. 2, C.L.I.F. 3, C.L.I.F. 4 and C.L.I.F. 5.

== Plot ==
The series showcases various kinds of cases police units deal with, from complicated and sensitive cases such as illegal immigrants and hostage situations to textbook crimes such as arson, drug trafficking, rape, and burglary.

The police force is tasked with handling security at the World Security Summit, which is to take place in several months. Over the weeks prior to the summit the different departments and police units at Tanglin Police Division are kept busy with their various cases while preparing for the summit.

Team B leader ASP Chong Yee Tat and his partner SSI(2) Yu Chong Nam are part of the elite Special Investigations Section in the CID. Yee Tat's work often takes him away from his wife Yongmei and their young son. Five years ago Yee Tat failed to crack a case in time and the suspect strangled his daughter before being apprehended. The girl was resuscitated but suffered irreversible brain damage. This case and the burden of having to juggle professional commitments with family life become a source of guilt for him throughout the series. ASP Zhang Cheng Ling, an officer with the Police Coast Guard, was transferred to his team and is determined to prove herself in a mostly male team and overcome Chong Nam's prejudice about her.

Meanwhile, senior investigating officer SI Tang Yew Jia has a new partner, ASP Leow Xin Yi, a temporary transfer to his team in the investigation branch. Yew Jia's seemingly cold exterior frustrates the optimistic Xin Yi. It turns out that he had joined the police force with his older brother but the duo had a falling out over differing views and he is deeply troubled by it. He is especially irked by cases involving unfilial children or adolescent offenders with no regard for authority. Xin Yi finds herself emotionally affected by some of her cases and begins to question her values and principles.

Kampong Java NPCO Sgt Teo Kwee Xiang is well known for his incessant griping and complaining, which annoys his colleagues to the point where his team leader SSI Chao Kok Hung was about to have him transferred. Kwee Xiang is regularly partnered with rookie CPL Han Xiao Yang when on patrol. The duo began their working relationship badly due to their different temperaments and backgrounds. Xiao Yang, whose goal is to join the CID, comes from a wealthy family and is frustrated by Kwee Xiang's seemingly lack of ambition and commitment while Kwee Xiang frequently berates her for being too naive. She soon realises that beneath his aloofness and negativity is a kind heart and strong commitment to the job. Kwee Xiang softens his approach when he realises that Xiao Yang had joined the police force to escape her parents' iron hand but had come to love it. He also takes Sgt Koh Wen Xiong under his wing and the trio become close friends.

The police force is tested when they lose one of their own. Wen Xiong was killed in the line of duty by a mentally unstable and violent suspect. While pursuing the suspect Kwee Xiang was forced to open fire for the first time, killing the man. The team is deeply affected and Kwee Xiang, in particular, and Kok Hung deal with feelings of guilt. As the summit draws ever closer, preparations are again thwarted when Xin Yi becomes "collateral damage" while investigating a seemingly mundane kidnapping and burglary case and is held hostage by a mysterious Korean-American man. Her colleagues soon find themselves dealing with a complicated web of firearms trafficking and cover-ups involving an Interpol-listed criminal syndicate.

In the epilogue (with a one-year time lapse), it is revealed that Kwee Xiang has been promoted to staff sergeant and deputy team leader, Xiao Yang earned a transfer to the investigation branch and became Yew Jia's new partner; she and Kwee Xiang are now an item. Xin Yi finished her term and has returned to frontline duty at the NPC. Cheng Ling's boyfriend proposed to her and she accepted. Yee Tat and his wife have reached a compromise and are reconciled.

== Cast ==
- Tay Ping Hui as ASP Chong Yee Tat (钟易达) - Officer-in-charge of Team B, Special Investigations Section (SIS) at Central Police Division CID
- Qi Yuwu as SI Tang Yew Jia (唐耀佳) - A senior investigation officer in the investigation branch of Tanglin Police Division
- Joanne Peh as ASP Leow Xin Yi (廖心怡) - An investigation officer at Tanglin Police Division and partner of Yew Jia in the investigation branch
- Chris Tong as ASP Zhang Cheng Ling (章岑琳) - Formerly a senior officer with the Police Coast Guard before being transferred to the SIS
- Elvin Ng as Sgt Teo Kwee Xiang (张贵祥) - An officer stationed at Kampong Java NPC within Tanglin Police Division
- Tracy Lee as Cpl Han Xiao Yang (韩晓洋) - A rookie officer assigned as Kwee Xiang's partner who aspires to work in the CID
- Rayson Tan as SSI(2) Yu Chong Nam (余忠南), senior SIS officer
- Rebecca Lim as Insp Liu Guat Mui "Moon" (刘月美), Investigation officer with the forensics team and Yee Tat and Yongmei's family friend
- Jade Seah as Insp Goh Pui Joo (吴佩如), Zhang Cheng Ling's colleague and friend in the PCG
- Bernard Tan DAC Sung Koh Teck (宋高德), Commander of Tanglin Police Division
- Aileen Tan as Superintendent Seetoh Yan (司徒燕), Head of Investigation(HI) of Tanglin Police Division
- Julian Hee as DSP Cheng Chee Hong (郑志鸿), Commanding Officer of Kampong Java NPC and Kok Hung's superior
- Andie Chen as SSI Chao Kok Hung (赵国煌), Kwee Xiang and Xiao Yang's team leader
- Romeo Tan as Sgt Koh Wen Xiong (许文雄), Kwee Xiang's colleague and junior at Kampong Java NPC
- Joey Ng as SI Foo Xiufang (傅秀芳), Kok Hung's deputy
- William Lawandi as Yap Weng Kwang (叶荣光), Head of Special Investigations Section (SIS) at Central Police Division CID
- May Phua as Xu Yongmei (徐咏梅), Yee Tat's wife
- Benjamin Heng as Tang Yew Cheng (唐耀成), Yew Jia's older brother
- Adam Chen as Lim Boon Loong (林文龙), Yee Tat's former colleague in the Security Command
- Desmond Tan as Xu Wenbin (徐文彬), Cheng Ling's boyfriend/fiancée

== Production ==
In order to inject realism, the main actors were put through a crash training course on police work and procedures conducted by the Training Command (TRACOM) at the Home Team Academy. Scenes were mostly filmed on location outdoors in various parts of Singapore and police establishments such as Tanglin Police Divisional HQ and Police Cantonment Complex. Police units featured include the Criminal Investigation Department, Police Coast Guard, Security Command and Special Operations Command specialist units including Police Tactical Unit, Special Tactics and Rescu, K-9 unit, Gurkha Contingent, and Crisis Negotiation Unit.

== Episodes ==
No. overall	No. in season	Title	Original release date	Repeat telecast
1	1	"Episode 1"	May 31, 2011	December 6, 2012 PG
2	2	"Episode 2"	June 1, 2011	December 7, 2012 PG
3	3	"Episode 3"	June 2, 2011	December 10, 2012 PG
4	4	"Episode 4"	June 3, 2011	December 11, 2012 PG
5	5	"Episode 5"	June 6, 2011	December 12, 2012 PG
6	6	"Episode 6"	June 7, 2011	December 13, 2012 PG
7	7	"Episode 7"	June 8, 2011	December 14, 2012 PG
8	8	"Episode 8"	June 9, 2011	December 17, 2012 PG
9	9	"Episode 9"	June 10, 2011	December 18, 2012 PG
10	10	"Episode 10"	June 13, 2011	December 19, 2012 PG
11	11	"Episode 11"	June 14, 2011	December 20, 2012 PG
12	12	"Episode 12"	June 15, 2011	December 21, 2012 PG
13	13	"Episode 13"	June 16, 2011	December 24, 2012 PG
14	14	"Episode 14"	June 17, 2011	December 25, 2012 PG
15	15	"Episode 15"	June 20, 2011	December 26, 2012 PG
16	16	"Episode 16"	June 21, 2011	December 27, 2012 PG
17	17	"Episode 17"	June 22, 2011	December 28, 2012 PG
18	18	"Episode 18"	June 23, 2011	December 31, 2012 PG
19	19	"Episode 19"	June 24, 2011	January 2, 2013 PG
20	20	"Episode 20 (Finale)"	June 27, 2011	January 3, 2013 PG

== Reception ==
C.L.I.F. was the 2nd most watched drama for 2011 with an average viewership of 924,000. The final episode attracted over 1,041,000 viewers. It also had 47,844 streams per episode, the highest average number of streams per episode on MediaCorp's Catch-Up TV portal on Xinmsn.

The series was also praised for the departure away from an idealised depiction of police officers and its more realistic portrayal of the unseen struggles and obstacles police officers and their families often face. In the past, most MediaCorp police procedurals were mostly focused on the action or comedy. In response, MediaCorp commissioned a second season, again in collaboration with the SPF, and filming began at the end of September. Most of the main cast is retained. Prior to filming, it was confirmed that Tay Ping Hui and Tracy Lee would not be returning and Rui En, Pierre Png, and Li Nanxing portrayed new characters. C.L.I.F. 2 debuted in February 2013.

=== Accolades ===
Organisation	Year	Category	Nominee(s)	Result	Ref
Star Awards	2012	Best Newcomer	Romeo Tan	Nominated	
Star Awards	2012	Favourite Male Character	Elvin Ng	Won	
Star Awards	2012	Star Awards for Favourite Onscreen Couple (Drama)	Joanne Peh and Qi Yuwu	Nominated	
Star Awards	2012	Best Director	Chong Liung Man	Won	
Star Awards	2012	Best Drama Cameraman	Liu Wing Chung	Nominated	
Star Awards	2012	Best Drama Set Design	Oh Hock Leong	Nominated	
Star Awards	2012	Best Drama Editing	Lee Beng Hui Steven	Nominated	
Star Awards	2012	Best Actor	Qi Yuwu	Nominated	
Star Awards	2012	Best Drama Serial	—N/a	Nominated	
Asian Television Awards	2011	Best Actor	Tay Ping Hui	Nominated	

== See also ==
- When Duty Calls
