= Counter-terrorism in Singapore =

Counter-terrorism in Singapore is a series of detection and prevention measures to minimize the damage caused by terrorism. These measures involve the participation of all levels of society, including defence, internal security, border and infrastructure security, civil defense, and gives special focus on areas such as medical readiness and psychological preparedness.

== Strategy ==
Singapore's main counter-terrorism strategy includes cooperation with regional and international partners to achieve a transnational landscape of security. Singapore is instrumental in the passage of international initiatives such as the landmark United Nations Security Council Resolution 1373 which established the legal basis for international action against terrorism. It is also at the forefront of the Southeast Asian counter-terrorism efforts and a United States partner in the Proliferation Security Initiative (PSI) that aims to combat the illicit trade and spread of weapons of mass destruction.

In recent years, Singapore's counter-terrorism initiatives have created political criticism from the country's Muslim population. This was particularly pronounced when Singapore joined the international community's call for Iraq's disarmament, which eventually led to the American invasion of the country.

== History ==
=== 1974: First international terrorism incident ===
Singapore's first encounter with international terrorism was on 31 January 1974.

On that day, four armed men from the Japanese Red Army and the Popular Front for the Liberation of Palestine attacked the Shell oil refinery complex on Pulau Bukom and later hijacked the ferryboat Laju, taking five crew members hostage.

The incident was resolved after the Singapore government exchanged the hostages for four Singapore Armed Forces commandos and eight government officials, led by S. R. Nathan, Director of the Security and Intelligence Division, and granted the attackers safe passage to the Middle East.

=== 1975–1990: Establishment of anti-terrorism units and Total Defence ===
The Laju hijacking incident in 1974 contributed to the establishment of full-time National Service for the country's police force in 1975, one year after the incident, referred to as Police National Service (PNS), which was aimed at, initially, raising a sizeable source of manpower for the police in the event of another terrorist incident on vital installations and the provision of protection and security for the latter against the former.

It also led to the establishment of an anti-terrorism team which was renamed as the Special Operations Force (SOF) in 1984.

In 1984, Total Defence was officially proclaimed as Singapore's overarching defence strategy on 22 January 1984 with five elements: military, civil, economic, social, and psychological.

In May 1990, the Singapore Civil Defence Force (SCDF) formed the Disaster Assistance and Rescue Team (DART) by merging its Rescue Squad and MRT Task Force. The first batch of DART consisted of an amalgamation of rescuers who were previously qualified for either of the units.

=== 1991–2000: Singapore Airline hijack and formation of the Special Operations Command ===
On 26 March 1991, four Pakistanis hijacked Singapore Airlines Flight 117.

The aircraft had taken off from Sultan Abdul Aziz Shah Airport in Subang near Kuala Lumpur with 114 passengers and 11 crew members on board.

The plane was hijacked in mid-air while en route to Singapore Changi Airport and later landed safely in Singapore.The Pakistani demanded the release of Pakistan Peoples Party members from Pakistani jails and the plane to be refuelled to fly to Australia. The next day, SOF commandos stormed the plane, killing all hijackers and freeing all passengers and crew members.

On 10 September 1992, the Special Operations Command (SOC) was formed, combining the Police Tactical Team (PTT), Police Tactical Unit (PTU) and Police Dog Unit under one wing.

=== 2001–2009: Failed Singapore embassies attack plot and Exercise Northstar ===
On 9 December 2001, six members of Jemaah Islamiyah (JI) were arrested for the Singapore embassies attack plot. Muhammad Aslam Yar Ali Khan, who is a Singaporean citizen of Pakistani descent and had made claims of having ties with Al-Qaeda. Khan was captured by United Islamic Front for the Salvation of Afghanistan officials. His interrogation led investigators to the Singaporean cell. Six people were arrested during the raid on 9 December with a further nine people within a month of the raid.

In August 2002, 19 members of JI, alongside two members of Moro Islamic Liberation Front (MILF), were arrested in Singapore. The JI plotted to blame the attacks on Singapore to Malaysia to create the impression that Singaporeans of Chinese descent were targeting Malays and Muslims in Malaysia to trigger a jihad in both countries. As of 11 November 2005, 36 alleged members of JI or MILF were detained under the Internal Security Act.

In late 2002 to early 2003, the Chemical, Biological, Radiological and Explosive Defence Group was formed by the Singapore Armed Forces to handle various chemical and biological attacks. On 17 January 2003, It conducted Exercise Diamond Shield at Nee Soon Camp to demonstrate its chemical and biological defence capability.

In May 2003, Chemical Verification Laboratory at DSO National Laboratories was certified by the Organisation for the Prohibition of Chemical Weapons as a designated laboratory for the testing of chemical warfare agents.

- 14 August 2003 – Air Marshal Unit is formed to counter terrorism threats against civil aviation.
- 1 October 2003 – The first Special Rescue Battalion of the Singapore Civil Defence Force is formed.
- 15 August 2005 – The newly established Police MRT Unit (now known as the Public Transport Security Command) begins operational patrols on the Mass Rapid Transit network to enhance the security of Singapore's public transport.
- 15 August 2005 – Singapore hosts a multi-national maritime interdiction exercise, codenamed Exercise Deep Sabre as part of the Proliferation Security Initiative.

On 25 August 2005, French investigating magistrate Jean-Louis Bruguière singles out Singapore along with Tokyo and Sydney as potential terrorism targets of the Al-Qaeda. The Ministry of Home Affairs responded that it had not received any specific information on terrorist threat but added that security measures have been taken to strengthen security at borders, key infrastructure and iconic buildings.

- 21 – 25 November 2005 – Singapore hosts the Regional Special Forces Counter-Terrorism Conference.
- 8 January 2006 – Exercise Northstar V, a large scale counter-terrorism exercise similar to 7 July 2005 London bombings, was held in Singapore.
- In May 2007, the parliament passed an amendment to the SAF Act, giving additional powers to the Singapore Armed Forces. A select group of about 2,000 SAF personnel will be trained to perform security operations in designated areas. These personnel, identified by a Military Security identification card, will be able to search, detain and use reasonable force against terror suspects.
- 6 July to 30 September 2009 – Exercise Northstar VII, large scale counter-terrorism exercise similar to the 2008 Mumbai attacks, the 2007 Virginia Tech massacre, and the 1999 Columbine High School massacre, was held in Singapore. Places that had been involved were VivoCity, Sentosa, Raffles Place, Bedok, Tampines, Choa Chu Kang, Jurong East, and Orchard Road.

=== 2010s ===
- 19 May 2010 – A marked map of the SMRT network with Orchard station circled on it was found in the home of a terror suspect killed in Indonesia; it was reported that he had planned an attack on Singapore by entering through Malaysia.
- 9 November 2010 – Exercise Times Square Conducted. The exercise, named after a car bomb attack in May 2010 at New York's Times Square which was foiled by public vigilance, involved similar circumstances whereby suspicious looking cars were placed in nine locations across Singapore. The findings of the exercise revealed that public vigilance was extremely low, as only 52 out of 7,200 passers-by contacted the authorities.
- 3 October to 15 November 2012 – Exercise Heartbeat 2012 was conducted. It was placed at locations, such as ION Orchard, Marina Centre, Marina Bay and Sentosa.
- 18 November 2013 – Exercise Heartbeat 2013 was conducted, placed at random locations, such as Greenview Secondary School, ITE College Central, Plaza Singapura, one-North and Raffles Place SSWG buildings. In this exercise, two "gunmen" hijacked a police car after opening fire at Raffles Place, and then drove away. The gunmen were later shot dead by the police officers at Queenstown Secondary School. Police officers later confiscated the explosive devices.
- 3 April 2014 – Exercise Heartbeat 2014 is conducted at Temasek Polytechnic.
- 10 October 2014 – Exercise Heartbeat 2014 is conducted at ITE College East.
- 26 October & 27 October 2014 – Exercise Heartbeat 2014 is conducted at Tampines GreenTerrace, Downtown MRT station, Marina Bay Link Mall, IMM Building, Blk 287A Jurong East Street 21, ITE College West and Fengshan area. It had simulated grenade explosion at IMM Building and Downtown MRT station, hostage-taking and gunmen firing at Marina Bay Link Mall, IMM Building, Blk 287A Jurong East Street 21 and ITE College West. Next to Blk 84 Bedok North Road Market also had the car on fire, part of Exercise Heartbeat 2014. At Tampines GreenTerrace; a Traffic Police car caught fire.
- 27 January 2015 – Due to the Charlie Hebdo shootings and the Sydney hostage crisis; Exercise Heartbeat 2015 was conducted at Eastpoint Mall and Northpoint Shopping Centre.
- 18 November 2015 – After the November 2015 Paris attacks, President Tony Tan expressed his condolences saying "As France mourns the victims, Singapore stands in solidarity with the French people in this difficult time" while Prime Minister Lee Hsien Loong condemned the attacks, calling them "heinous" and "an attack on our shared humanity." Within days, the Singapore Police Force and Singapore Civil Defence continued Exercise Heartbeat 2015 with emergency preparedness exercises on 18 November 2015 at Toa Payoh HDB Hub and Marina Bay One Marina Boulevard (OMB) and City Hall Esplanade Park, as well as at Sentosa on 23 November 2015.
- 30 June 2016 – The Minister of Defence announced the formation of the Army Deployment Force, which is a battalion-sized unit fully staffed with regular SAF servicemen. The unit will respond rapidly to terrorist attacks in Singapore alongside the Home Team. It will also work with the Island Defence Task Force and Special Operations Task Force in times of emergencies. It may be activated for overseas humanitarian or peace support operations.
- 5 August 2016 – Members of a terror cell in Indonesia arrested for plotting to fire a rocket at Marina Bay Sands from Batam island.
- 17 October 2016 – The Singapore Armed Forces staged the largest counter-terror exercise in the nation's history. The SAF was deployed to defend against mock attacks at key installations around the island. Home Team and the Singapore Civil Defence Force were deployed to counter a mock hostage taking at Bishan Mall. The exercise was the largest in Singaporean history, involving over 3200 officers. It was conducted with the mission statement to raise public awareness of "the current threat landscape and to encourage continued vigilance."

In 2019, digital defence was added as the sixth element of Total Defence, with the government highlighting increasing threats in the cybersphere.

=== 2020s ===
- 27 January 2021 – the Internal Security Department reported that it had arrested a 16-year old Protestant youth under the Internal Security Act in late 2020 for plotting to attack two local mosques on the anniversary of the 2019 Christchurch mosque shootings. The youth was inspired by the actions of Brenton Tarrant and expressed anti-Muslim sentiments. He is the youngest person and first far right extremist to be charge under the ISA.
- 10 March 2021 – the Internal Security Department reported that it had detained a 20-year old national serviceman named Amirull Ali in February 2021 under the Internal Security Act for plotting to attack three Jewish worshippers at the Maghain Aboth Synagogue in retaliation for the Israel–Palestine conflict. Ali had reportedly also planned to travel to Gaza to join Hamas' military wing, the Izz ad-Din al-Qassam Brigades.
- 24 January 2024 - the ISD confirmed it had issued a restriction order under the Internal Security Act against a 16-year old Chinese Singaporean youth who had aspired to carry out overseas attacks against African Americans, Arabs, and LGBTQ+ individuals in North America and Europe. The youth had been radicalised by far right online chat groups and channels. He identified as a White supremacist and subscribed to the Great Replacement theory. Under the restriction order, the youth is not allowed to change his residence, is barred from leaving Singapore, access the Internet or social media and issue public statements, without the approval of the director of the ISD.
- 15 July 2024 - the ISD confirmed it had issued restriction orders against a 14-year old Singaporean teenager and former public servant An'nadya An'nahari, who had both been radicalised in response to the Gaza war. The teenager had wanted to fight for a prophesied Muslim army called the "Black Flag Army" and started an online chat group for the purpose of recruiting classmates for perpetrating terror attacks in Singapore. An'nahari had expressed support for the Islamist Axis of Resistance, a network of Islamist militant and terror groups including Hamas and the Houthi, and advocated violence against Israelis and Jews.
- 18 October 2024 – Minister for Law and Home Affairs K. Shanmugam confirmed that a 17 year old youth had been arrested under the Internal Security Act for planning to attack non-Muslims in Tampines.
- 9 January 2025 - the ISD confirmed it had detained three men under the Internal Security Act in October 2024 for making plans to acquire weapons and travel overseas to fight against Israel.
- 10 February 2025:
  - The ISD issued a restriction order against Singaporean housewife Hamizah Hamzah for running social media accounts promoting pro-Axis of Resistance and Hamas content. Her husband and cleaner Saharuddin Saari was deported to Malaysia in November 2024.
  - The ISD confirmed it had detained 18-year old Singaporean student Nick Lee Xing Qiu, who had espoused far right and neo-Nazi beliefs and views, in December 2024 for planning to attack Muslims at a mosque.
- 11 February – The Ministry of Home Affairs confirms it has deported Iranian national Parvane Heidaridehkordi and her Malaysian husband Soo Thean Ling for running a travel company that sponsored visa applications by terrorism-linked foreigners seeking to enter Singapore. Authorities determined that the travel company was a front organisation controlled by an overseas-based foreigner.

== Homeland security ==
The Singapore Police Force has in recent years enhanced security at various locations in the country.

On 15 August 2005, the newly established Public Transport Security Command began operational patrols on the Mass Rapid Transit network to protect the public transportation system. Personnel from the Special Operations Command (SOC) and the Gurkha Contingent (GC) have also been deployed to complement other police officers on patrol. In addition, the Police Coast Guard (PCG) stepped up its effort to inspect ferries and other vessels in Singapore territorial waters.

On 26 October 2005, Deputy Prime Minister and Co-ordinating Minister for Security and Defence S Jayakumar announced that Singapore was developing an early warning system, called the risk assessment and horizon scanning, to identify and assess new emerging threats to national security. The system, developed by the National Security Coordination Secretariat, will be put in place by mid-2007.

== Counter terrorist specialised units ==
At the forefront in the fight against terrorism are specialised military, law enforcement, and civil defence units, namely:

- Singapore Special Operations Force,
- Special Operations Command,
- Chemical, Biological, Radiological and Explosive Defence Group,
- Army Deployment Force

== Exercise Northstar ==
=== Exercise Northstar V ===
In December 2005, Exercise Northstar V, a large scale emergency preparedness exercise, was announced. The exercise was intended to educate the public and to train emergency personnel to handle multiple incidents concurrently.

On 8 January 2006, Exercise Northstar V was conducted on four MRT stations (Raffles Place, Dhoby Ghaut, Toa Payoh and Marina Bay) and one bus interchange (Toa Payoh). The exercise involved a simulated terrorist bomb attack with 500 mock casualties suffering from "injuries" caused by the "explosions" as well as chemical agents. The exercise involved 22 agencies and 2,000 emergency personnel participated in the exercise. The exercise is the largest civil emergency exercise ever staged in the country.

=== Conduct of the exercise ===
The exercise started at 6:25 am local time on 8 January 2006, a Sunday, and lasted about three hours. To avoid public panic, announcements were made at the affected train stations as well as on television and radio, just before the exercise began. Prominent signages were also displayed.

Mock explosive devices, such as thunderflashes were detonated near-simultaneously in subway trains and station platforms at four MRT stations (Dhoby Ghaut, Toa Payoh, Raffles Place and Marina Bay) and in a double decker bus at Toa Payoh Bus Interchange. A chemical agent attack was then simulated at Dhoby Ghaut at 6:45 am. An undetonated mock bomb was also placed at the Raffles Place. About 3,400 commuters who were on board the MRT trains were evacuated during the drill. Services at 13 MRT stations were temporarily disrupted and roads within the vicinity were also closed to traffic. Shuttle buses were used to ferry commuters affected by the exercise.

Thunderflashes, smoke generators, and fire simulators were used to simulate the explosion and 500 simulated casualties were deployed to test emergency rescuers at the scene. These mock casualties carried tags to provide paramedics information on the extent of their injuries and this includes injuries related to bomb blasts, such as open wounds and burns. There were also some with injuries related to chemical agents. Dummy mannequins were also used to simulate casualties. 7 hospitals and 2 polyclinics were also involved in the drill as they received the mock casualties. In two hospitals, Singapore General Hospital and Tan Tock Seng Hospital, healthcare workers donned decontamination suits as they prepared to treat victims of chemical agents suspected to be sarin gas.

Officers from the London Metropolitan Police and the British Transport Police, including Chief Constable Ian Johnston, were present to observe the exercise and to provide feedback to the authorities.

== Social cohesion ==
Following the crackdown on the local Jemaah Islamiyah cell, then-Deputy-Prime Minister Goh Chok Tong held dialogues with the leaders of the Muslim community. Details of the investigation were shared to explain that the arrests were not targeted at the Singapore Muslim community, or Islam. In schools and workplaces, inter-racial confidence circles were formed to promote inter-racial and inter-religious understanding between the different racial and religious communities, while Islamic scholars and counselors in Singapore participated in the rehabilitation of the detained JI members.

== See also ==
- Kiddy Bag
- Religious Rehabilitation Group (Singapore)
