= Security on the Mass Rapid Transit (Singapore) =

In the Mass Rapid Transit system in Singapore, security issues related to crime and terrorism were not high on the agenda of the system's planners since its inception, but since the occurrence of several high-profile terrorism incidents elsewhere, CCTVs have been upgraded and installed across all stations, and security officers patrol inside the trains and within train stations 24/7.

== Enforcement ==
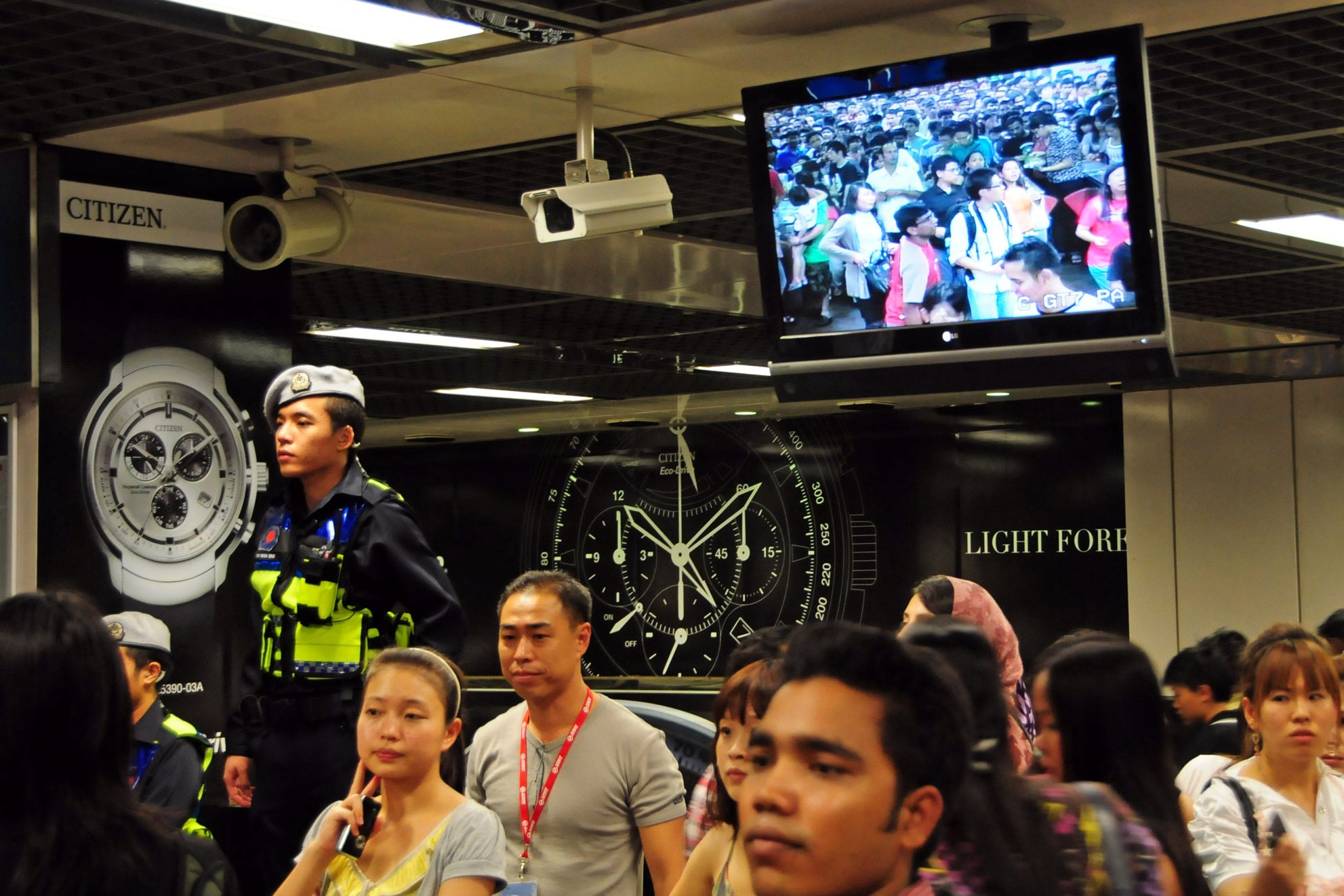
An officer from the Public Transport Security Command surveys the high traffic volume in the immediate hours after the 2010 new year celebrations at City Hall MRT station. The human traffic can be seen captured by surveillance cameras and shown on the monitor.

In the wake of heightened security concerns as a result of the September 11, 2001 attacks, and also particularly the 11 March 2004 Madrid attacks in which the commuter rail system was targeted, the Singapore government initiated several measures aimed at securing the rail system from a similar attack. In the months immediately after the Madrid attacks, the two rail operators, SMRT Corporation and SBS Transit, started employing private unarmed guards who patrol the station platforms, and are empowered to check the belongings of commuters. The security firms are G4S Security (for SMRT) and Premier Security (for SBS Transit), but after the security breach at Bishan Depot in August 2011, the security firm; G4S Security revoked contract and moved to Certis CISCO.

In reaction to a second major terrorist attack on a public transport system in the 7 July 2005 London bombings, the police deployed armed Police Tactical Unit officers to patrol within stations the day after the bombings occurred, while pre-existing security measures were placed on higher alert.

On 14 April 2005, the Singapore Police Force made a public announcement on its plans to step-up rail security by establishing a new specialised then known as the Police MRT Unit. These armed officers began visible patrols on the MRT and LRT systems on 15 August 2005, conducting random patrols in pairs in and around rail stations and within trains. Dressed in tactical uniforms similar to members from the Police Tactical Unit, they are however differentiated by blue-coloured berets, and are armed with less firepower with each officer carrying a Taurus Model 85 revolver and T-baton similar to officers from Neighbourhood Police Centres. These officers are trained and authorised to utilise their firearms based on the officers' discretion, including "shoot to kill" if deemed necessary; which was evolved into the independent unit known as the Public Transport Security Command in August 2009. Alcohol is based on an issue, thereby roadblocks were set up to prevent intoxication on the Mass Rapid Transit since January 2009.

On 5 November 2018, the Land Transport Authority announced a 6-month trial of enhanced security screening that would take place at selected stations. The trial began shortly after on 12 November, with up to six stations randomly selected to conduct the checks for a period of time. The stations are – Ang Mo Kio and Bedok (November 2018), Promenade (December 2018), Chinatown (February 2019), Tampines and Clementi (March 2019). Checks are done one person at a time to reduce delays, and the data obtained from the trial would be used to improve the screening process.

== Announcements & notices ==
Be aware of your surroundings. If you become a victim of crime, please approach station staff for help, or call 999 immediately. 请看管好您的随身物。若发现任何形迹可疑的人物或可疑物品，请通知我们的工作人员或拨999报警。

— Station announcement example

Please do not leave your belongings unattended. If you see any suspicious-looking person or article, please inform our staff or press the emergency communication button located at the side of the train doors. 请保管好您的随身物件。若发现任何形迹可疑的人或遗留在车厢内的可疑物件，请通知我们的工作人员或使用车厢内的对话机便我们的职员联络。

— In-train announcement example

- Recorded audio announcements such as the above played in stations & trains respectively, notices on plasma display screens on station platforms and in train carriages, as well as posters and notices in stations remind commuters to report instances of unattended packages and other suspicious activities to the authorities.

== Exercise Northstar V ==
On 8 January 2006, a major civil exercise, codenamed Exercise Northstar V and simulating bombing and chemical attacks at Dhoby Ghaut, Toa Payoh, Raffles Place and Marina Bay MRT stations was conducted. Thirteen affected stations were closed during the three-hour duration of the exercise, affecting about 3,400 commuters.

== Exercise Station Guard ==
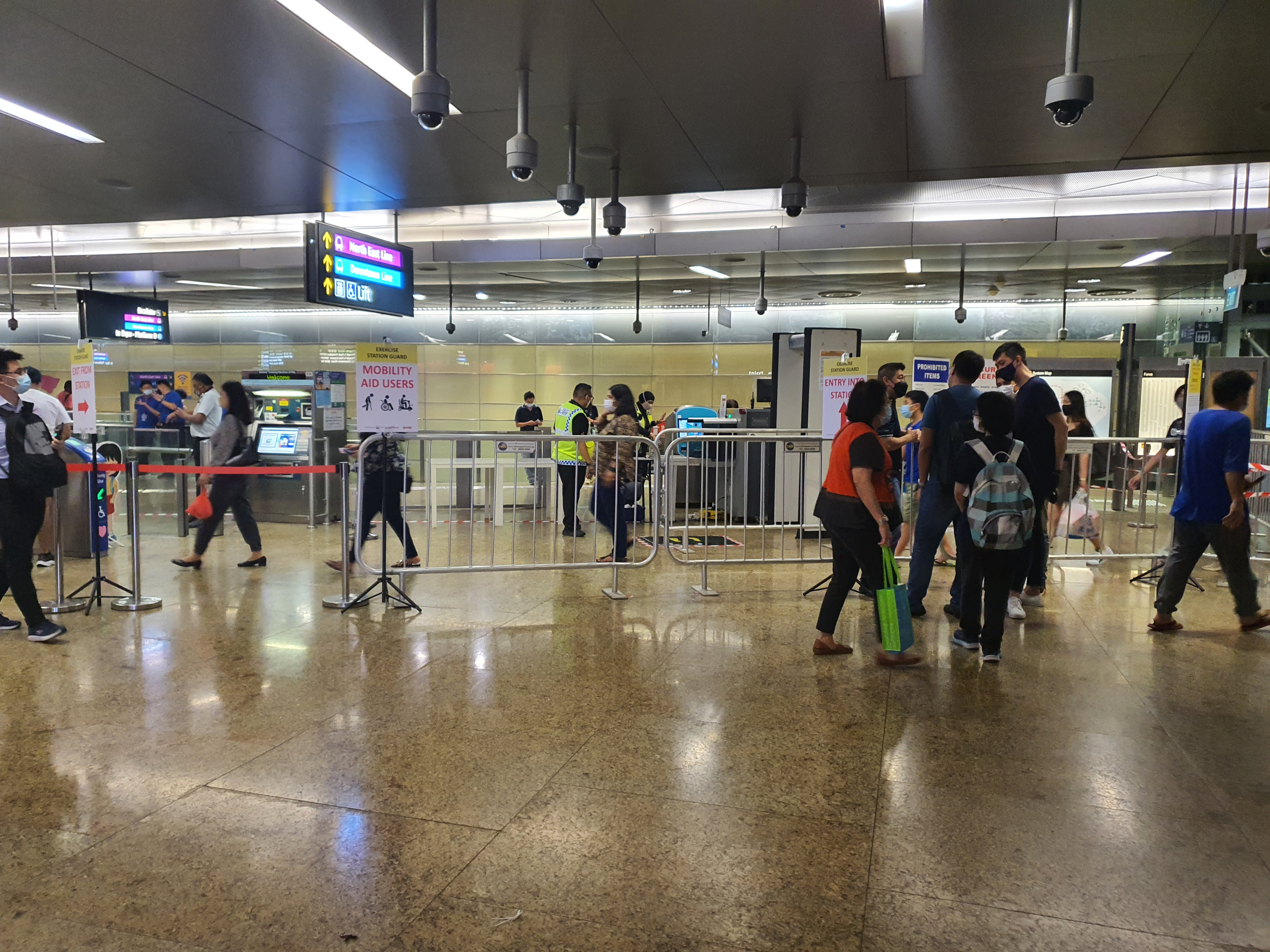
Exercise Station Guard held at Chinatown MRT station

Since 2018, the Land Transport Authority launched Exercise Station Guard, an emergency preparedness ground deployment exercise intended to test the adequacy of existing security measures and maintain vigilance for quicker and effective responses. The first test was held at Newton MRT station, followed by Holland Village MRT station.
