= Johor Darul Ta'zim F.C. – Sri Pahang FC rivalry =

Football rivalry in Malaysia

Johor Darul Ta'zim - Sri Pahang rivalry
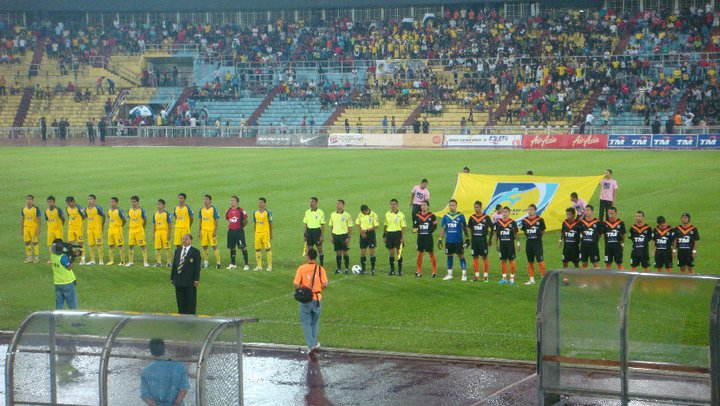
- Pahang FA (yellow) and Johor FC (black) pre-match lineup during a Super League fixture.
- Other names: Royal Derby; The Classic
- Location: Peninsular Malaysia
- Teams: Johor Darul Ta'zim; Sri Pahang
- First meeting: 16 March 1995; Malaysia FA Cup; PKEN Johor 1–6 Pahang
- Latest meeting: 26 April 2025; Malaysia Cup; Johor DT 2–1 Sri Pahang
- Stadiums: Sultan Ibrahim Stadium (Johor Darul Ta'zim); Darul Makmur Stadium (Sri Pahang)

Statistics
- Total meetings: 56
- Most wins: Johor Darul Ta'zim (31)
- Most player appearances: Safiq Rahim (21 matches)
- Top scorer: Bérgson (10 goals)
- All-time series: JDT: 31; Drawn: 10; Pahang: 15
- Largest victory: Sri Pahang 0-6 Johor Darul Ta'zim; Malaysia Super League (18 June 2016)
- Largest goal scoring: Pahang FA 5–3 Johor FC; Malaysia FA Cup (30 June 2004)
- Longest win streak: 6 games Johor Darul Ta'zim (2022–2026)
- Longest unbeaten streak: 14 games Johor Darul Ta'zim (2019–2026)
- Current unbeaten streak: 14 games Johor Darul Ta'zim (2019–present)

The JDT-Pahang rivalry, also known as the Royal Derby or The Classic, is a football rivalry between Johor Darul Ta'zim F.C. and Sri Pahang FC. The derby is an inter-state rivalry in the southeastern region of Peninsular Malaysia, as the states of Johor and Pahang share a border. Johor Darul Ta'zim play their home matches at the Sultan Ibrahim Stadium, while Sri Pahang play their home matches at the Darul Makmur Stadium. The first meeting between the two sides took place in 1995, with the first competitive fixture being a Malaysian FA Cup match, which Johor FC lost 1–6 against Pahang.

== History ==
=== Historical background ===
Johor Darul Ta'zim (JDT) and Sri Pahang have a history of competition dating back to the early 2000s. The first competitive meeting between the two clubs took place in the 1995 Malaysia FA Cup season, when Pahang defeated PKEN Johor 1–6. However, their meetings during this period did not develop into a major rivalry. The rivalry developed more prominently following the reorganisation of Johor's football structure in 2012, which saw the club compete under the JDT identity.

The first meeting between JDT and Pahang in the 2013 Malaysia Super League took place on 22 January, with Pahang winning 3–2. The rivalry intensified later that season following crowd trouble during the Malaysia FA Cup semi-final second leg at the Darul Makmur Stadium.

=== Early Sparks (2013) ===
The rivalry developed further during the 2013 Malaysia FA Cup semi-finals. JDT won the first leg 1–0 at the Tan Sri Dato' Haji Hassan Yunos Stadium on 25 May, before the second leg was held at the Darul Makmur Stadium on 28 May.

The second leg was postponed following problems with crowd control at the stadium. Reports stated that the attendance exceeded the stadium's capacity, while supporters entered the running track and security personnel attempted to control the crowd. The situation subsequently deteriorated, with objects being thrown and supporters from both sides involved in disorder. The match was eventually called off on safety grounds.

The replay was subsequently moved to the Bukit Jalil National Stadium on 1 June. Pahang won the match 2–1, but JDT advanced to the final on the away-goals rule after the aggregate score finished 2–2.

=== Classified as "Heavyweight" match (2014–2015) ===
The rivalry became more prominent during the 2014 season, when the two sides met in the Malaysia Cup final at the Bukit Jalil National Stadium on 1 November. The match ended 2–2 after extra time, with Pahang winning 5–3 on penalties to retain the Malaysia Cup.

Relations between the two supporter groups also came under scrutiny during this period. In October 2014, an image circulated online showing individuals wearing Pahang-related clothing standing on a Johor state flag. The incident was condemned by officials associated with Pahang football, who said an investigation would be conducted to determine whether those involved were Pahang supporters.

The rivalry continued into the 2015 season when JDT hosted Pahang in the Sultan Ahmad Shah Cup at the Tan Sri Dato' Haji Hassan Yunos Stadium on 31 January. JDT won 2–0. During the match, JDT supporters displayed a large tifo depicting a figure with a dog's head wearing a suit bearing the Football Association of Malaysia (FAM) emblem and holding a smaller figure. Twelve supporters were subsequently arrested in connection with the display.

The incident attracted criticism from football officials and Pahang representatives. The tifo was widely interpreted as criticism of FAM, although reports differed over whether the imagery was specifically directed at individuals associated with Pahang.

=== Competitive encounters and JDT dominance (2016–2024) ===
From 2016 onwards, the competitive balance between the two clubs increasingly shifted in JDT's favour. On 18 June 2016, JDT defeated Pahang 6–0 at the Darul Makmur Stadium, the largest victory recorded between the sides.

Pahang nevertheless recorded notable victories in cup competitions. In the 2017 Malaysia FA Cup quarter-finals, Pahang defeated JDT 4–3 on aggregate after winning the first leg 3–1 in Kuantan. The following year, Pahang eliminated JDT from the Malaysia FA Cup quarter-finals again, winning 3–0 in the second leg at the Tan Sri Dato' Haji Hassan Yunos Stadium and advancing 3–0 on aggregate.

After 2018, however, JDT established a long unbeaten run against Pahang in competitive matches. The period also coincided with JDT's continued dominance of domestic Malaysian football, while Pahang was no longer regularly competing with JDT for the league title.

=== Malaysia Cup final (2025) ===
The two clubs met again in the 2025-26 Malaysia Cup final on 26 April 2025 at the National Stadium in Bukit Jalil. Sri Pahang took the lead through T. Saravanan in the 14th minute, before JDT equalised through Bergson da Silva from a penalty in the 54th minute. Arif Aiman Mohd Hanapi scored the winning goal in the 74th minute as JDT won 2–1.

The final was attended by 55,552 spectators and marked the first Malaysia Cup final between the two clubs since 2014.

== Hooliganism and violence ==
The rivalry has occasionally been marred by serious incidents of crowd trouble and provocative displays. Due to the high stakes and geographical proximity, matches often require a massive security presence to manage volatile tensions between fanbases.

=== Darul Makmur Incident ===
In May 2013, the Malaysia FA Cup semi-final second leg between Pahang and Johor Darul Ta'zim (JDT) at Darul Makmur Stadium was postponed on safety grounds after overcrowding and crowd trouble. Attendance reportedly exceeded the stadium's capacity, with around 40,000 spectators in a venue built for approximately 35,000. Home supporters then threw stones and other objects towards the away section, leaving several JDT fans with head injuries that required medical treatment. The match was rescheduled and moved to the Bukit Jalil National Stadium, and Pahang were penalised for failing to provide adequate security. The incident marked the beginning of an intensified rivalry between the two clubs, and later meetings were routinely treated as high-risk fixtures.

=== Crowd trouble and arrests ===
On 15 May 2014 Super League a violent riot erupted inside the Darul Makmur stadium right after Pahang defeated Johor Darul Ta'zim 3–2. Stadium security failed as a large group of home fans broke through barriers and charged the away section holding the JDT fans. A massive fight broke out, with fans throwing plastic stadium seats, wooden sticks, and stones at each other. Outnumbered and trapped, JDT fans smashed the pitch fencing and fled onto the running track and football field to escape the attack. The violence quickly spilled outside into the parking lots. Local hooligans ambushed the JDT fan buses, smashing their glass windows with bricks. The Federal Reserve Unit (FRU) riot police had to use tear gas and shields to clear the crowds. JDT supporters were trapped inside the stadium under heavy police guard for three hours before they could safely leave. The Football Association of Malaysia (FAM) later fined Pahang RM40,000 for failing to control matchday security.

On 23 April 2017, a tense standoff erupted outside the stadium gates after Pahang knocked JDT out of the Malaysia FA Cup. Following the match, hundreds of local fans swarmed the parking compound and completely blockaded the exit routes. The hostile crowd surrounded the JDT supporter buses, trap-locking the traveling fans inside for nearly two hours. Light Strike Force (LSF) riot police units and stadium security personnel had to form a massive human wall to push the aggressive crowd back. The JDT bus caravan was eventually extracted and required a heavy Royal Malaysia Police escort all the way out of the state borders to ensure safe passage back to Johor.

On 26 April 2025, fans of JDT and Sri Pahang clashed outside the National Stadium in Bukit Jalil before the Malaysia Cup final kicked off. The confrontation began near the Axiata Arena entrance and escalated into a brawl, with traffic cones thrown and flares lit.

Matches between the two clubs has resulting in approximately 35 reported arrests. These incidents included clashes between supporters, post-match disturbances and other security-related issues surrounding matches between the two clubs. Such incidents have prompted police intervention and raised concerns regarding spectator behaviour and stadium security during fixtures involving the two sides.

=== Zero-tolerance policy ===
To ensure safety during matches between Johor Darul Ta'zim and Sri Pahang, strict security protocols are enforced at Sultan Ibrahim Stadium and Darul Makmur Stadium. Due to the high-profile nature of this rivalry, security measures have included strict fan segregation, separate access arrangements and designated areas for opposing supporters. On matchdays, opposing supporters are guided through separate entry points and kept in designated seating areas to prevent crowds from overlapping. In 2014, police and the Federal Reserve Unit (FRU) escorted JDT supporters from Darul Makmur Stadium following disturbances after a match against Pahang.. Both clubs and stadium authorities maintain a strict stance against hooliganism and disorder, with spectators involved in violence or prohibited activities subject to police action. Stadium management also coordinates with local police forces to increase security personnel, conduct ticket and spectator checks, and prevent prohibited items from being brought into the stadium. For the 2024–25 Malaysia Cup final between JDT and Sri Pahang, police announced body and bag inspections and warned that individuals involved in violence or disorder would face strict action under Malaysian law.

== List of matches ==
Johor win
Pahang win
Draw

Seasons	Date	Tournament	Home team	Score	Away team
1995	16 March 1995	FA Cup group stage	PKEN Johor	1–6	Pahang
2002	19 March 2002	Liga Perdana 1	Johor FC	2–0	Pahang
2002	22 June 2002	Liga Perdana 1	Pahang	3–2	Johor FC
2003	29 March 2003	Liga Perdana 1	Pahang	4–1	Johor FC
2003	1 July 2003	Liga Perdana 1	Johor FC	2–1	Pahang
2004	16 June 2004	FA Cup quarter-final	Johor FC	1–2	Pahang
2004	30 June 2004	FA Cup quarter-final	Pahang	5–3	Johor FC
2005	6 August 2005	Malaysia Cup group stage	Pahang	6–1	Johor FC
2005	20 August 2005	Malaysia Cup group stage	Johor FC	0–4	Pahang
2006/07	21 February 2007	Malaysia Super League	Johor FC	2–1	Pahang
2006/07	6 June 2007	Malaysia Super League	Pahang	2–3	Johor FC
2007/08	29 January 2008	Malaysia Super League	Johor FC	1–0	Pahang
2007/08	16 February 2008	Malaysia Super League	Pahang	2–1	Johor FC
2009	3 January 2009	Malaysia Super League	Pahang	2–3	Johor FC
2009	23 May 2009	Malaysia Super League	Johor FC	4–0	Pahang
2010	6 March 2010	Malaysia Super League	Johor FC	2–1	Pahang
2010	3 August 2010	Malaysia Super League	Pahang	3–0	Johor FC
2010	12 October 2010	Malaysia Cup quarter-final	Johor FC	1–0	Pahang
2010	15 October 2010	Malaysia Cup quarter-final	Pahang	2–1	Johor FC
2011	12 March 2011	Malaysia Super League	Pahang	0–0	Johor FC
2011	6 July 2011	Malaysia Super League	Johor FC	2–1	Pahang
2013	22 January 2013	Malaysia Super League	Pahang	3–2	Johor Darul Ta'zim
2013	14 May 2013	Malaysia Super League	Johor Darul Ta'zim	1–0	Pahang
2013	25 May 2013	FA Cup semi-final	Johor Darul Ta'zim	1–0	Pahang
2013	28 May 2013	FA Cup semi-final	Pahang	1–1	Johor Darul Ta'zim
2014	7 February 2014	Malaysia Super League	Johor Darul Ta'zim	2–2	Pahang
2014	15 April 2014	Malaysia Super League	Pahang	3–2	Johor Darul Ta'zim
2014	1 November 2014	2014 Malaysia Cup Final	Johor Darul Ta'zim	2–2 (3–5 p)	Pahang
2015	31 January 2015	Charity Shield	Johor Darul Ta'zim	2–0	Pahang
2015	11 July 2015	Malaysia Super League	Pahang	1–1	Johor Darul Ta'zim
2016	16 February 2016	Malaysia Super League	Pahang	1–1	Johor Darul Ta'zim
2016	18 June 2016	Malaysia Super League	Johor Darul Ta'zim	6–0	Pahang FC
2017	3 March 2017	Malaysia Super League	Johor Darul Ta'zim	3–2	Pahang FA
2017	1 April 2017	FA Cup quarter-final	Pahang	3–1	Johor Darul Ta'zim
2017	23 April 2017	FA Cup quarter-final	Johor Darul Ta'zim	2–1	Pahang
2017	11 July 2017	Malaysia Super League	Pahang	0–2	Johor Darul Ta'zim
2018	3 February 2018	Malaysia Super League	Johor Darul Ta'zim	1–0	Sri Pahang
2018	8 June 2018	Super League	Sri Pahang	1–2	Johor Darul Ta'zim
2018	24 June 2018	FA Cup quarter-final	Sri Pahang	0–0	Johor Darul Ta'zim
2018	1 July 2018	FA Cup quarter-final	Johor Darul Ta'zim	0–3	Sri Pahang
2019	28 April 2019	Malaysia Super League	Sri Pahang	1–1	Johor Darul Ta'zim
2019	14 May 2019	Malaysia Super League	Johor Darul Ta'zim	2–0	Sri Pahang
2019	22 October 2019	Malaysia Cup semi-final	Sri Pahang	3–3	Johor Darul Ta'zim
2019	26 October 2019	Malaysia Cup semi-final	Johor Darul Ta'zim	2–1	Sri Pahang
2020	6 March 2020	Malaysia Super League	Johor Darul Ta'zim	3–2	Sri Pahang
2021	20 March 2021	Malaysia Super League	Sri Pahang	0–2	Johor Darul Ta'zim
2021	27 August 2021	Malaysia Super League	Johor Darul Ta'zim	3–0	Sri Pahang
2022	16 April 2022	Malaysia Super League	Johor Darul Ta'zim	2–2	Sri Pahang
2022	31 August 2022	Malaysia Super League	Sri Pahang	0–3	Johor Darul Ta'zim
2023	24 May 2023	Malaysia Super League	Johor Darul Ta'zim	2–0	Sri Pahang
2023	8 July 2023	Malaysia Super League	Sri Pahang	1–6	Johor Darul Ta'zim
2024/25	18 May 2024	Malaysia Super League	Johor Darul Ta'zim	3–0	Sri Pahang
2024/25	22 September 2024	Malaysia Super League	Sri Pahang	0–3	Johor Darul Ta'zim
2024/25	26 April 2025	2024-25 Malaysia Cup Final	Johor Darul Ta'zim	2–1	Sri Pahang

== Head-to-head ranking in Malaysian league ==
Promoted Relegated Sri Pahang withdraw

P.	82	83	84	85	86	87	88	89	90	91	92	93	94	95	96	97	98	99	00	01	02	03	04	05	06	07	08	09	10	11	12	13	14	15	16	17	18	19	20	21	22	23	24	25
1						1					1			1				1					1										1	1	1	1	1	1	1	1	1	1	1	1
2			2							2							2							2										2		2		2						
3				3																							3					3	3											
4					4			4				4																4	4								4							
5	5	5																		5		5										5										5		
6													6								6					6																		
7									7										7			7			7					7											7			
8																											8		8										8				10	
9							9														9					9					9				9									
10																10																								10				
11															11																													
12																																												
13																												13		13														
14																																												
15																																												
16																																												
17																																												
18																																												
19																																												
20																																												

- Total: Pahang with 24 higher finishes, JDT with 20 higher finishes.
- Title Wins: Of 44 seasons, 17 seasons ended with either a Pahang or a JDT championship.
- Lowest Finishes: Johor FC's lowest finish was 9th in the 2012 season, and Pahang's lowest finish was 13th in the 2011 season. Both teams have been relegated from the top flight.

== Players who played for both clubs ==
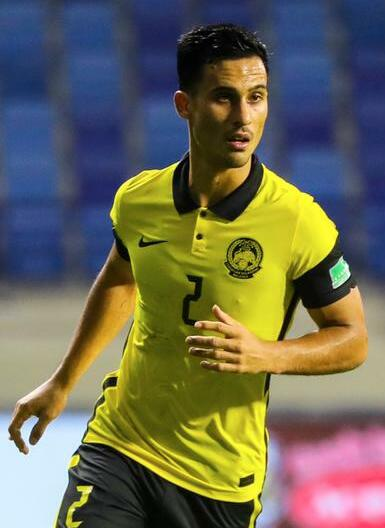
Matthew Davies has made over 80 league appearances for both Sri Pahang and Johor Darul Ta'zim.

Johor Darul Ta'zim to Pahang
- 2004: (Australia) Ante Juric
- 2009: (Malaysia) Saifulnizam Miswan (via Johor FA and ATM)
- 2018: (Malaysia) Norshahrul Idlan (via ATM, Terengganu and Felda United)
- 2020: (Malaysia) Fazly Mazlan
- 2020: (Malaysia) Kumaahran Sathasivam
- 2023: (Malaysia) Izham Tarmizi
- 2023: (Malaysia) Fadhli Shas (via Malacca)
- 2023: (Malaysia) Syazwan Andik (via Malacca)
- 2023: (Malaysia) Azrif Nasrulhaq
- 2024: (Malaysia) Adam Nor Azlin

Pahang to Johor Darul Ta'zim

- 2020: (Malaysia) Matthew Davies
- 2018: (Malaysia) Kiko Insa (via Bangkok Glass)
- 2021: (Malaysia) Mohamadou Sumareh (via Police Tero)
- 2014: (Malaysia) Amirul Hadi (via Selangor)
- 2024: (Malaysia) Gopi Rizqi
- 2024: (Malaysia) Manuel Hidalgo (via Kedah)
- 2025: (Malaysia) Ibrahim Manusi
- 2016: (Malaysia) Azamuddin Akil (via Kelantan)
- 2006: (Malaysia) Wan Rohaimi Wan Ismail (via Terengganu, Penang, Public Bank, Selangor)

== All-time top scorers ==
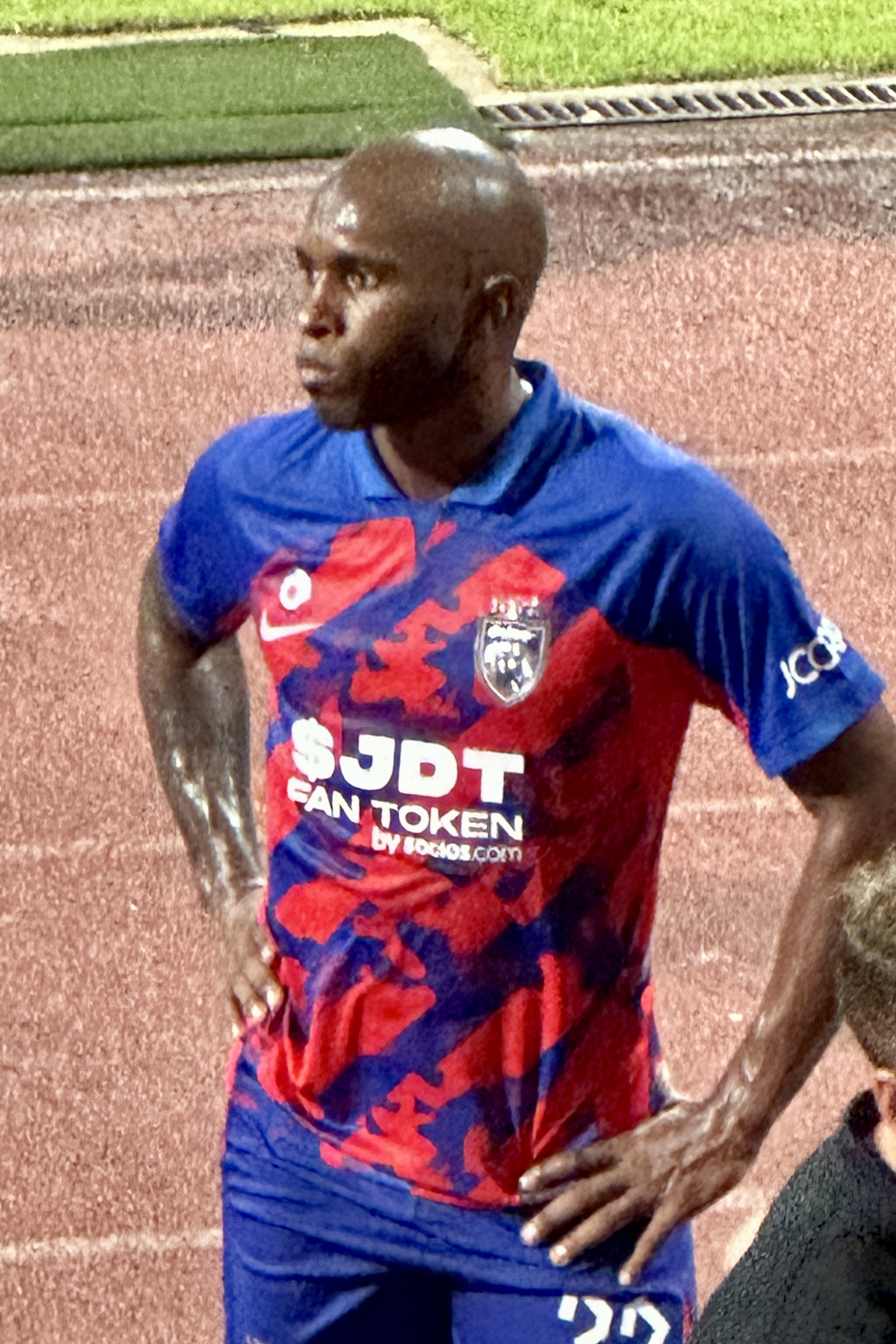
Heberty is the second all-time top scorer in the Johor Darul Ta'zim–Sri Pahang rivalry with 4 goals.

As of 15 May 2026, the top scorer of all time in the jdt-pahang rivalry is Bérgson with 10 goals scored, all for Johor Darul Ta'zim. The top scorer for Pahang in the rivalry matches is Patrick Cruz, with 3 goals.

Rank	Nat.	Player	Goals	Club
1	(Malaysia)	Bérgson	10	Johor Darul Ta'zim
2	(Brazil)	Heberty	4	Johor Darul Ta'zim
3	(Argentina)	Gonzalo Cabrera	4	Johor Darul Ta'zim
4	(Brazil)	Patrick Cruz	3	Sri Pahang
5	(France)	Hérold Goulon	2	Sri Pahang

== Highest attendance ==
Attendance Records (JDT vs Sri Pahang)
Rank	Attendance	Date	Competition	Stadium	Ref
1	90,000	1 November 2014	2014 Malaysia Cup Final	Bukit Jalil National Stadium	
2	55,552	26 April 2025	2024-25 Malaysia Cup Final	Bukit Jalil National Stadium	
3	40,000	28 May 2013	FA Cup Semi-final (Leg 2)	Bukit Jalil National Stadium	
4	30,000	31 January 2015	Charity Shield	Larkin Stadium	
5	29,100	1 April 2017	FA Cup Quarter-final (Leg 1)	Darul Makmur Stadium	

== Honour ==
As of 2 May 2026

Johor Darul Ta'zim	Competition	Sri Pahang
Domestic
12	Malaysia Super League (Division 1)	5
1	Malaysia Premier League (Division 2)	–
2	FAM League (Division 3)	–
6	Malaysia Cup	4
5	Malaysia FA Cup	3
11	Charity Shield	3
Continental
1	AFC Cup	–

== See also ==
- East Coast Derby
- Southern Derby
- Klang Valley Derby
- Malayan El'Clasico
- List of association football rivalries
- List of sports rivalries
