= CNU =

CNU could stand for:

== University ==
- Capital Normal University, Beijing, China
- Cebu Normal University, Philippines
- Chia Nan University of Pharmacy and Science, Tainan, Taiwan
- Chonnam National University, Gwangju, South Korea
- Christopher Newport University, Newport News, Virginia, US
- Chungnam National University, Daejeon, South Korea

== Police ==
- Crisis Negotiation Unit, a special police unit for hostage, barricade, and suicide situations
  - FBI Crisis Negotiation Unit
  - Singapore Police Force Crisis Negotiation Unit

== Others ==
- Cameroonian National Union, later Cameroon People's Democratic Movement
- Congress for the New Urbanism
- CNU (singer) (born 1991), Korean
