= Kiddy Bag =

Safety kit for children in Singapore

Kiddy Bag is a safety kit issued by the Singapore Civil Defence Force (SCDF) that is designed to help children to cope in an emergency.

The bag contains a whistle to draw attention, a wristband with the child's name, address, and contact number to help identify a lost child. The bag includes a bright red cap for children to wear and help them stand out in the crowd. There is also a teddy bear to comfort the children during a crisis.

SCDF unveiled the Kiddy Bag on 28 August 2005 during an emergency drill at Kampong Ubi.

SCDF has earlier designed a similar Ready Bag tailored for the adults.

== See also ==
- Counter-terrorism in Singapore
