= Police National Service Full-time Light Strike Force =

Former part of Singapore Police Force

Coordinates: 1°17′42.41″N 103°48′01.76″E

The Police National Service Full-time Light Strike Force (PNSF LSF) was part of Special Operations Command, a division of Singapore Police Force, located at Queensway Base in Singapore from 1998 to 2005.

== History and nature ==
The Police Full-time LSF was established in June 1998. In the beginning, there were 4 squads, namely LSF A, LSF B, LSF C and LSF D. Each squad consisted of at least 20 men then, led by a senior officer holding a rank of inspector or above. He was assisted by a National Service Inspector (NSI).

These squads were trained mainly in riot control and every squad was capable of undertaking the task of quelling any riot which involves 80 people or less. Officers were also equipped with T-batons, shields and other riot gear. They had to maintain a higher level of physical fitness than normal officers, and to be alert at all times so that they would always beready to respond within minutes to any serious emergency that may arise.

During peacetime however, officers periodically performed standby, patrol, covert (plain clothes) and some other policing duties with other Special Operations Command units or various police divisions.
