= Queensway Base =

Police installation in Singapore

Coordinates: 1°17′42.41″N 103°48′01.76″E

Queensway Base is the police installation that is home to the Special Operations Command (SOC), a front line department within the Singapore Police Force (SPF). It is situated directly across Queensway, and was formerly the Old Queenstown Police Station. Units such as the Police Tactical Unit, Special Tactics and Rescue (STAR) unit, Crisis Negotiation Unit (CNU), K-9 Unit and some SOC units are located here.
