= Chemical, Biological, Radiological and Explosive Defence Group =

Counter-terrorism unit in Singapore

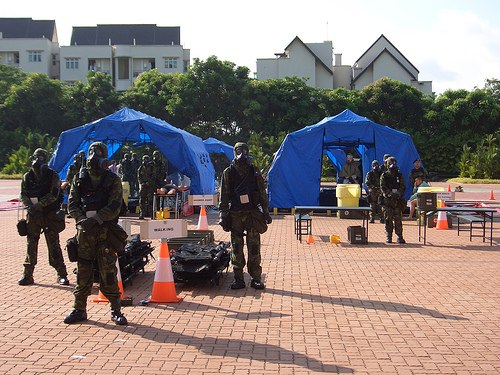
The Medical Response Force working with the CBRE, during an exercise.

The Chemical, Biological, Radiological and Explosive Defence Group (CBRE Defence Group) is a group formed by various Singapore Armed Forces (SAF) units to enhance counter-terrorism capabilities and provide an immediate response in the event of chemical and biological incidents.

CBRE Defence Group works closely with the Singapore Civil Defence Force, Singapore Police Force, Ministry of Health, Ministry of the Environment, as well as the Defence Science and Technology Agency and DSO National Laboratories.

== Organization ==
The group consists of two battalions from the Singapore Combat Engineers — the 36th and the 39th, specializing in Explosive Ordnance Disposal and chemical, biological and radiological defence respectively.

CBRE work closely with the Medical Response Force (MRF) which is the Elite medical arm of the Singapore Armed Forces Medical Corps. The MRF main task is to manage and treat casualties from a chemical or biological attack. The CBRE's task on the other hand is to secure and clear the area during a chemical or biological attack. MRF comes directly under the SAF Army Medical Services (AMS).

== Notable exercises ==
On 17 January 2003, CBRE Defence Group conducted an exercise code-named Exercise Diamond Shield to demonstrate its capability in counter-terrorism. Another exercise was conducted on 20 January 2006, with simulated multiple CBRE incidents.

In September 2005, CBRE Defence Group took part in a bilateral exercise with Australia code-named Star Lion in Sydney, to enhance its preventive and responsive capabilities.

They also featured prominently in Exercise Northstar V, held on 8 January 2006 and involving an enactment of bombing and chemical attacks at four Mass Rapid Transit stations and a bus interchange.
