= Public Transport Security Command =

Specialized transport police unit in Singapore

Coordinates: 1°19′34.88″N 103°53′26.63″E

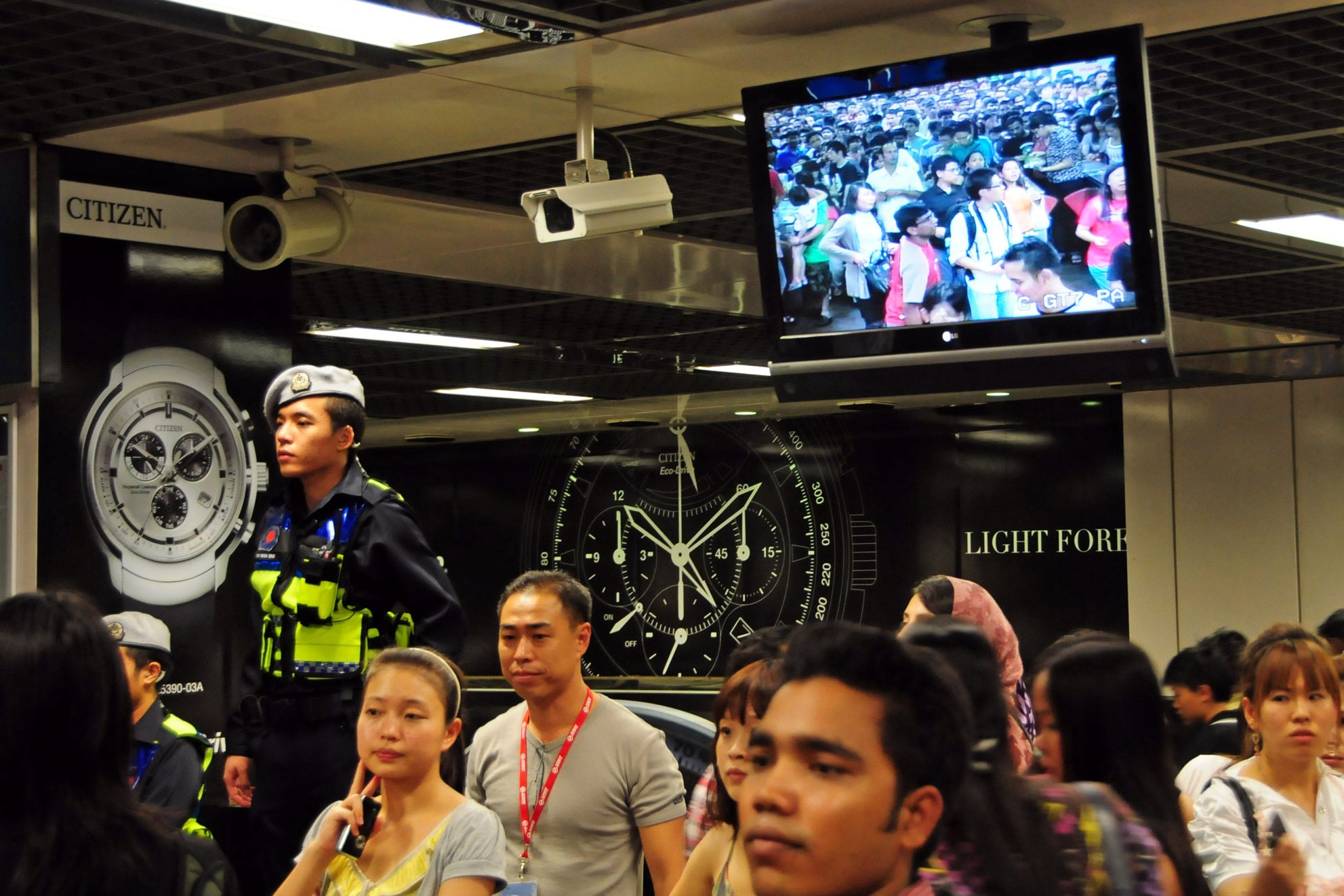
A TransCom officer surveying human traffic in the immediate hours after the 2010 New Year's Day celebrations at City Hall MRT station. The human traffic shown on the video screen is fed from a surveillance camera.

The Public Transport Security Command (TransCom) is a specialised transit police unit of the Singapore Police Force (SPF). It was first established as the Police MRT Unit (PMU) in 2005 as a component unit of the Special Operations Command in response to the need for greater security in public transport operations in Singapore influenced by security concerns at the time. On 15 August 2009, the unit was upgraded into a separate specialist division and took its present name.

== History ==
In April 2005, during the annual Police Workplan seminar of the Singapore Police Force in April 2005, Minister for Home Affairs Wong Kan Seng announced plans to set up a specialised unit. The unit was called the Police MRT Unit (Abbreviation: PMU; Malay: Unit Polis MRT; Chinese: 地铁警卫队) and was part of the Special Operations Command. Officers began operational patrols on the Mass Rapid Transit network from 15 August 2005.

Plans to enlarge the PMU into an independent unit within the SPF was announced in 2008. The transition was completed on 15 August 2009 when the unit was upgraded took its present name, reflecting its expanded role to police the entire public transportation network in Singapore. In 2008, it shifted from its base at Queensway Base to the former Geylang Police Division headquarters building.

== Manpower and equipment ==
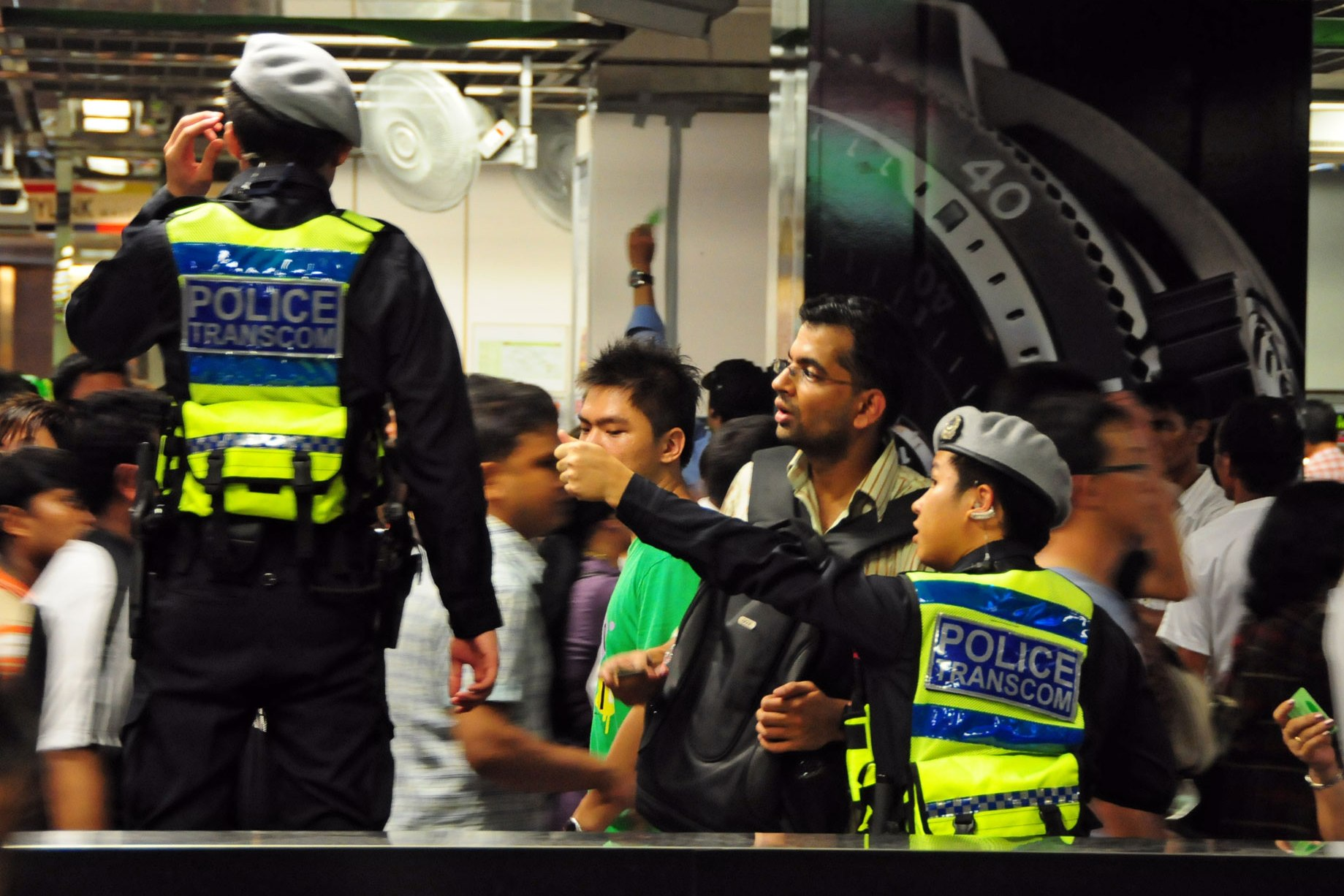
TransCom officers surveying and directing the public on New Year's Day in 2010 at City Hall MRT Station. Note the grey beret that was just introduced two days before on 30 December 2009.

TransCom draws its manpower from the regular as well as the conscript full-time national servicemen (NSF) resources, with the build of officers amongst the selection criteria. Taller and well-built officers are chosen to project a tougher presence. Officers are trained to conduct policing work in confined and crowded spaces, and are familiarised with the MRT system's operations. In 2007, the unit began to include Volunteer Special Constabulary officers in its ranks.

Each TransCom officer is armed with a revolver, T-baton, set of handcuffs and portable radio. Regulars, as well as selected NSFs, are trained in the use of the Taser, as a less-than-lethal option to defuse situations where lethal force would not be deemed necessary. Officers are dressed in dark blue tactical uniforms similar to those worn by Police Tactical Unit officers. Officers initially wore blue-coloured berets, but were given light grey-coloured berets on 30 December 2009, with the dual purpose of signifying their distinction as an independent department and increasing visibility during operations.

== Operations ==
TransCom officers currently operate in pairs or larger groups in and around stations and trains on the MRT network. These patrols, which may include the inspection and searching of suspicious packages and persons, are deliberately kept random to retain an element of surprise for greater operational effectiveness.

Initially deployed only on the MRT system, TransCom Officers now have their area of operations extended to the bus interchanges and terminals, which were previously patrolled by Neighbourhood Police Centre officers.
