= Johor Darul Ta'zim F.C.–Negeri Sembilan FC rivalry =

Football rivalry in Malaysia

Johor Darul Ta'zim - Negeri Sembilan rivalry
- Khairi Kiman (right) challenges Shukor Adan (center) for the ball.
- Location: Southern peninsula Malaysia
- Teams: Johor Darul Ta'zim FC; Negeri Sembilan FC
- First meeting: 22 September 2001; Malaysia Cup; Johor FC 1–4 Negeri Sembilan
- Latest meeting: 11 September 2026; Malaysia Super League; Johor DT 3-0 Negeri Sembilan
- Stadiums: Sultan Ibrahim Stadium (Johor Darul Ta'zim); Tuanku Abdul Rahman Stadium (Negeri Sembilan)

Statistics
- Total meetings: 40
- Most wins: Johor Darul Ta'zim (21)
- Most player appearances: Aidil Zafuan (20 matches)
- Top scorer: Bérgson (10 goals)
- All-time series: JDT: 21; Drawn: 6 Negeri Sembilan: 13
- Largest victory: Negeri Sembilan 0-7 Johor Darul Ta'zim; Malaysia Super League (6 March 2023)
- Largest goal scoring: Negeri Sembilan FA 5–3 Johor FC Malaysia FA Cup (6 February 2010); Johor Darul Ta'zim 5–3 Negeri Sembilan Malaysia Super League (12 August 2025)
- Longest win streak: 16 games Johor Darul Ta'zim (2013–2026)
- Longest unbeaten streak: 16 games Johor Darul Ta'zim (2013–2026)
- Current unbeaten streak: 16 games Johor Darul Ta'zim (2013–present)

The JDT-Negeri Sembilan rivalry is a football rivalry between Johor Darul Ta'zim F.C. (JDT) and Negeri Sembilan FC (NS). The derby is an inter-state rivalry in the south region of Peninsular Malaysia, as the states of Johor and Negeri Sembilan share a border. Johor Darul Ta'zim play their home matches at the Sultan Ibrahim Stadium, while Negeri Sembilan play their home matches at the Tuanku Abdul Rahman Stadium. The rivalry dates back to 2001, with the first competitive fixture being a Malaysia Cup group stage match, which Johor FC lost 1–4 against Negeri Sembilan. As of 2026, Johor Darul Ta'zim has maintained a dominant unbeaten run against their rivals for over a decade.

== History ==
=== Historical backgrounds and origins ===
The roots of both clubs date back to the 20th century history of Malaysian football. Negeri Sembilan was originally established in 1923 as the Negeri Sembilan Football Association (NSFA), making it one of the older state football associations in the country. Meanwhile, Johor Darul Ta'zim traces its official lineage back to 1972, when it was founded as the Perbadanan Kemajuan Ekonomi Negeri Johor Football Club (PKENJ FC) before changed their name into Johor FC, and later undergoing a massive rebranding in late 2012 under the vision of the Crown Prince of Johor. Despite their long individual histories, the two sides did not become regular opponents until the 2000s. Through the 2000s and early 2010s, Negeri Sembilan and Johor FC met often in the league, the Malaysia Cup and the FA Cup, and those matches built the rivalry.

=== Geographical proximity and regional identity ===
The foundation of the rivalry lies in geography. Johor and Negeri Sembilan are neighbouring states in the southern region of Peninsular Malaysia that share a border, and matches between their representative clubs have consequently carried an element of local and regional pride. Both fanbases competed for regional bragging rights in the south. When the two teams met, the journey for away supporters was relatively short compared with trips to the north or the east coast, which made for lively atmospheres at both the Sultan Ibrahim Stadium in Iskandar Puteri and the Tuanku Abdul Rahman Stadium in Paroi, Seremban. State pride and regional standing motivated the local fanbases, turning ordinary league matches into emotionally charged encounters.

=== Negeri Sembilan's prominence and JDT's overtaking ===
In the 2000s and early 2010s, Negeri Sembilan was one of the most successful clubs in the southern region of Peninsular Malaysia. During this period it won the Super League in 2006, the FA Cup in 2003 and 2010, and the Malaysia Cup in 2009 and 2011. Johor FC, by comparison, won far fewer major honours in the same years. This changed after JDT's rebranding in 2012. Backed by heavy investment under the Crown Prince of Johor, the club quickly became a title contender and soon went on to dominate the league, replacing Negeri Sembilan as the leading club in the south.

== Hooliganism and violence ==
The rivalry between Johor Darul Ta'zim F.C. and Negeri Sembilan FC is frequently marked by high-tension atmospheres and crowd disturbances. Classified as a high-risk fixture, the "Southern Derby" requires heavy security to manage the intense rivalry between supporters.

=== 2022 Stadium Paroi incident ===
During a Super League match on 11 May 2022, crowd unrest occurred at Tuanku Abdul Rahman Stadium after JDT scored a late winning goal. Sections of the home crowd hurled plastic bottles and objects toward the pitch and visiting fans. Outside the stadium, the situation escalated with the lighting of firecrackers, leading to several arrests by the Police.

=== Clashes between supporter ===
On 1 November 2024, violent clashes broke out between rival supporters near Stadium Tuanku Abdul Rahman. The confrontation, which went viral on social media, resulted in the arrest of five supporters .

== List of matches ==
Johor win
Negeri Sembilan win
Draw

Seasons	Date	Tournament	Home team	Score	Away team
2001	22 September 2001	Malaysia Cup Group Stage	Johor FC	1–4	Negeri Sembilan
2001	9 October 2001	Malaysia Cup Group Stage	Negeri Sembilan	4–1	Johor FC
2002	9 February 2002	Liga Perdana 1	Negeri Sembilan FA	1–0	Johor FC
2002	11 May 2002	Liga Perdana 1	Johor FC	2–1	Negeri Sembilan FA
2005	26 March 2005	Liga Perdana 2	Johor FC	1–1	Negeri Sembilan FA
2005	22 May 2005	Liga Perdana 2	Negeri Sembilan FA	3–0	Johor FC
2006/07	16 December 2006	Malaysia Super League	Johor FC	0–0	Negeri Sembilan FA
2006/07	4 August 2007	Malaysia Super League	Negeri Sembilan FA	1–1	Johor FC
2007/08	1 January 2008	Malaysia Super League	Negeri Sembilan FA	2–0	Johor FC
2007/08	30 March 2008	Malaysia Super League	Johor FC	2–4	Negeri Sembilan FA
2009	10 February 2009	Malaysia Super League	Negeri Sembilan FA	3–0	Johor FC
2009	27 June 2009	Malaysia Super League	Johor FC	3–0	Negeri Sembilan FA
2010	12 January 2010	Malaysia Super League	Johor FC	1–1	Negeri Sembilan FA
2010	2 February 2010	FA Cup round 1	Johor FC	2–2	Negeri Sembilan FA
2010	6 February 2010	FA Cup round 1	Negeri Sembilan FA	5–3	Johor FC
2010	11 May 2010	Malaysia Super League	Negeri Sembilan FA	2–1	Johor FC
2010	20 October 2010	Malaysia Cup semi-final	Negeri Sembilan FA	0–1	Johor FC
2010	23 October 2010	Malaysia Cup semi-final	Johor FC	0–2	Negeri Sembilan FA
2011	12 March 2011	Malaysia Super League	Johor FC	0–0	Negeri Sembilan FA
2011	19 May 2011	Malaysia Super League	Negeri Sembilan FA	2–1	Johor FC
2012	14 February 2012	Malaysia Super League	Johor FC	0–2	Negeri Sembilan FA
2012	18 February 2012	FA Cup round 1	Negeri Sembilan FA	1–2	Johor FC
2012	19 June 2012	Malaysia Super League	Negeri Sembilan FA	2–1	Johor FC
2013	2 March 2013	Malaysia Super League	Johor Darul Ta'zim	2–1	Negeri Sembilan FA
2013	2 July 2013	Malaysia Super League	Negeri Sembilan FA	0–2	Johor Darul Ta'zim
2015	4 March 2015	FA Cup round 2	Johor Darul Ta'zim	4–1	Negeri Sembilan FA
2016	4 March 2016	FA Cup round 3	Johor Darul Ta'zim	4–1	Negeri Sembilan FA
2018	23 May 2018	Malaysia Super League	Negeri Sembilan	0–4	Johor Darul Ta'zim
2018	23 May 2018	Malaysia Super League	Johor Darul Ta'zim	2–0	Negeri Sembilan FA
2022	10 May 2022	Malaysia Super League	Negeri Sembilan	0–1	Johor Darul Ta'zim
2022	1 October 2022	Malaysia Super League	Johor Darul Ta'zim	5–0	Negeri Sembilan
2023	6 March 2023	Malaysia Super League	Negeri Sembilan	0–7	Johor Darul Ta'zim
2023	8 July 2023	Malaysia Super League	Johor Darul Ta'zim	2–0	Negeri Sembilan
2023	13 September 2023	Malaysia Cup Quarter-Final	Negeri Sembilan	0–3	Johor Darul Ta'zim
2023	19 October 2023	Malaysia Cup Quarter-Final	Johor Darul Ta'zim	4–1	Negeri Sembilan
2024/25	18 May 2024	Malaysia Super League	Johor Darul Ta'zim	3–1	Negeri Sembilan
2024/25	1 November 2024	Malaysia Super League	Negeri Sembilan	0–4	Johor Darul Ta'zim
2025/26	12 August 2025	Malaysia Super League	Johor Darul Ta'zim	5–3	Negeri Sembilan
2025/26	9 January 2026	Malaysia Super League	Negeri Sembilan	0–1	Johor Darul Ta'zim
2026/27	11 September 2026	Malaysia Super League	Johor Darul Ta'zim	3–0	Negeri Sembilan
2026/27	27 March 2027	Malaysia Super League	Negeri Sembilan	–	Johor Darul Ta'zim

== Head-to-head ranking in Malaysian league ==
Promoted Relegated

P.	82	83	84	85	86	87	88	89	90	91	92	93	94	95	96	97	98	99	00	01	02	03	04	05	06	07	08	09	10	11	12	13	14	15	16	17	18	19	20	21	22	23	24	25
1																									1								1	1	1	1	1	1	1	1	1	1	1	1
2																											2																	
3											3				3			3									3					3												
4																												4	4												4			
5																																												
6																			6		6					6			6		6													
7																7						7						7		7														7
8																				8										8														
9			9														9														9											9		
10							10					10																																
11														11												11																		
12					12								12																			12					12						12	
13		13																																										
14																					14																							
15				15																																								
16						16																																						
17																																												
18																																												
19																																												
20																																												

- Total: Negeri Sembilan with 19 higher finishes, JDT with 19 higher finishes.
- Title Wins: Of 44 seasons, 13 seasons ended with either a Negeri Sembilan or a JDT championship.
- Lowest Finishes: Johor FC's lowest finish was 9th in the 2012 season, and Negeri Sembilan lowest finish was 16th in the 1987 season. Both teams have been relegated from the top flight.

== Players who played for both clubs ==
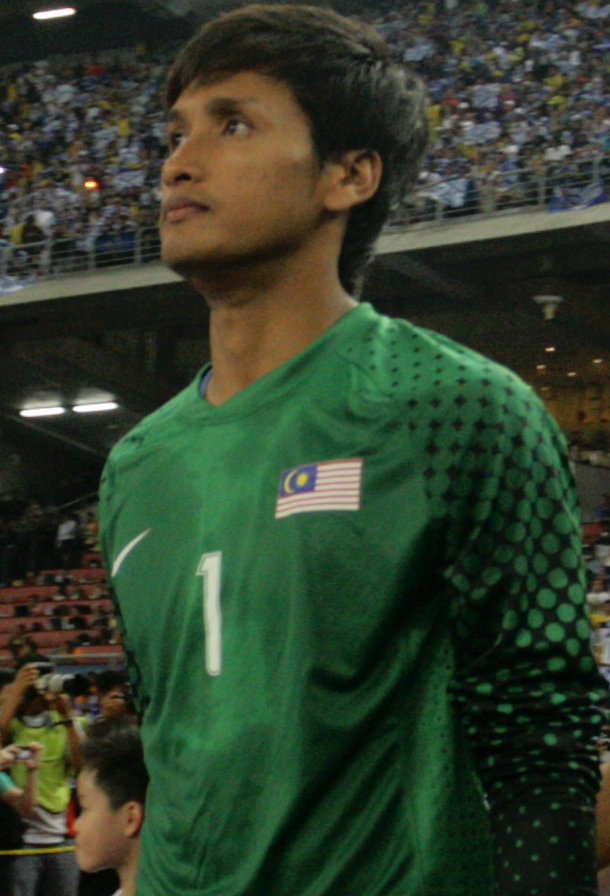
Farizal Marlias has made over 50 league appearances for both Negeri Sembilan and Johor Darul Ta'zim.

=== JDT to Negeri Sembilan ===
- (Malaysia) Mahalli Jasuli
- (Malaysia) Hadin Azman
- (Malaysia) Eddy Helmi
- (Malaysia) Sumardi Hajalan

=== Negeri Sembilan to JDT ===
- (Malaysia) Farizal Marlias
- (Malaysia) Syihan Hazmi
- (Malaysia) Aidil Zafuan
- (Malaysia) S. Kunanlan
- (Malaysia) Nazrin Nawi
- (Malaysia) Zaquan Adha
- (Malaysia) K. Thanaraj
- (Malaysia) Norshahrul Idlan

== All-time top scorers ==
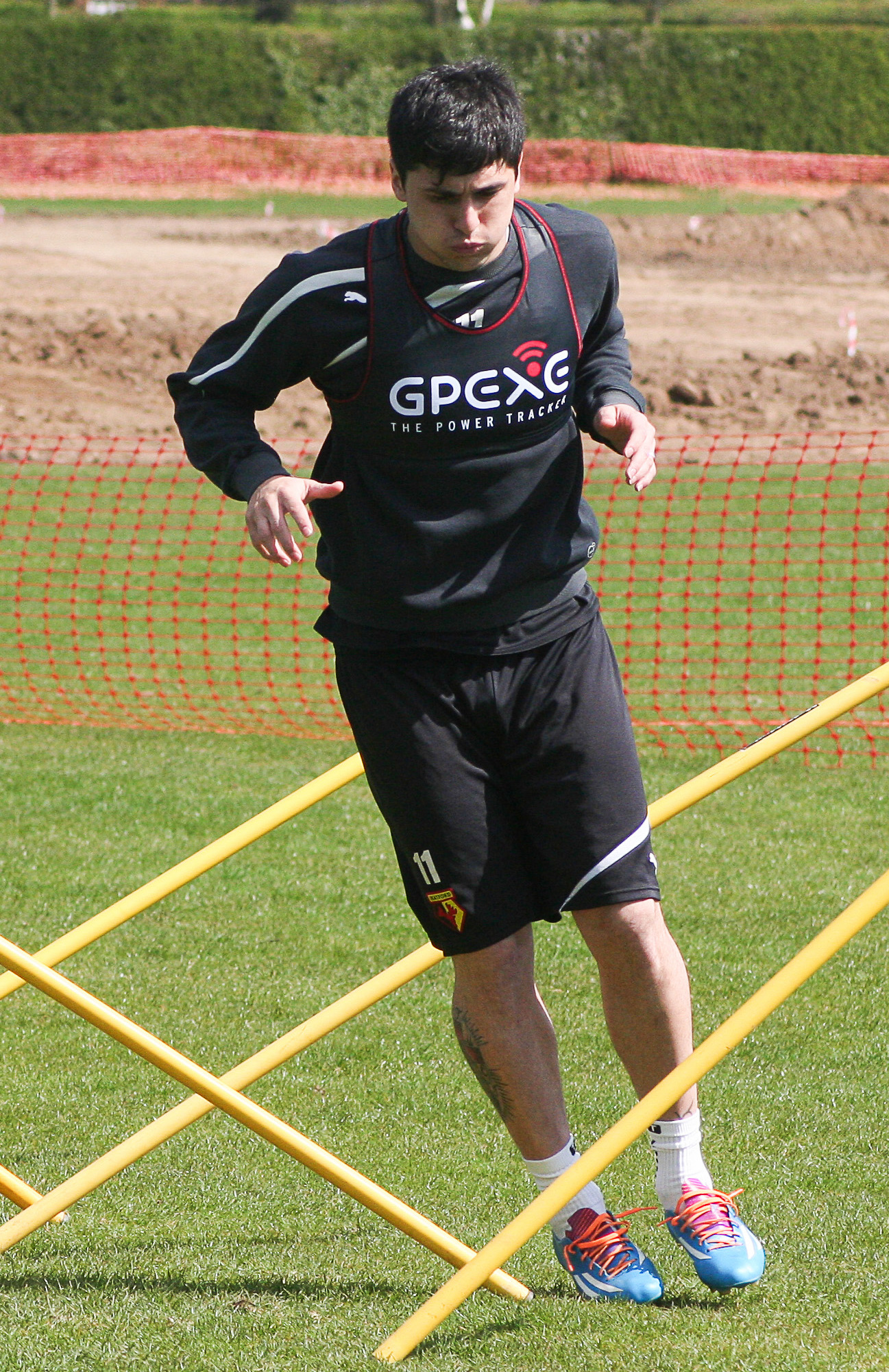
Fernando Forestieri is the third all-time top scorer in the Johor Darul Ta'zim–Negeri Sembilan rivalry with 4 goals.

As of 11 September 2026, the top scorer of all time in the jdt-negeri sembilan rivalry is Bérgson with 10 goals scored, all for Johor Darul Ta'zim. The top scorer for Negeri Sembilan in the rivalry matches is Jovan Motika, with 2 goals.

Rank	Nat.	Player	Goals	Club
1	(Malaysia)	Bérgson	10	Johor Darul Ta'zim
2	(Malaysia)	Arif Aiman	6	Johor Darul Ta'zim
3	(Italy)	Fernando Forestieri	4	Johor Darul Ta'zim
4	(Argentina)	Gonzalo Cabrera	3	Johor Darul Ta'zim
5	(Malaysia)	Corbin-Ong	3	Johor Darul Ta'zim

== Highest attendance ==
Attendance Records (JDT vs Negeri Sembilan)
Rank	Attendance	Date	Competition	Stadium	Ref
1	25,886	1 October 2022	Malaysia Super League	Sultan Ibrahim Stadium	
2	22,224	11 May 2022	Malaysia Super League	Tuanku Abdul Rahman Stadium	
3	16,518	9 January 2026	Malaysia Super League	Tuanku Abdul Rahman Stadium	

== Honour ==
As of 2 May 2026

Johor Darul Ta'zim	Competition	Negeri Sembilan
Domestic
12	Malaysia Super League (Division 1)	1
1	Malaysia Premier League (Division 2)	2
2	FAM League (Division 3)	–
6	Malaysia Cup	3
5	Malaysia FA Cup	2
11	Charity Shield	1
Continental
1	AFC Cup	–

== See also ==
- East Coast Derby
- Royal Derby
- Southern Derby
- Klang Valley Derby
- Malayan El'Clasico
- List of association football rivalries
- List of sports rivalries
