= Special Tactics and Rescue (Singapore) =

Elite police tactical unit

Coordinates: 1°17′42.41″N 103°48′01.76″E

Special Tactics and Rescue-Singapore
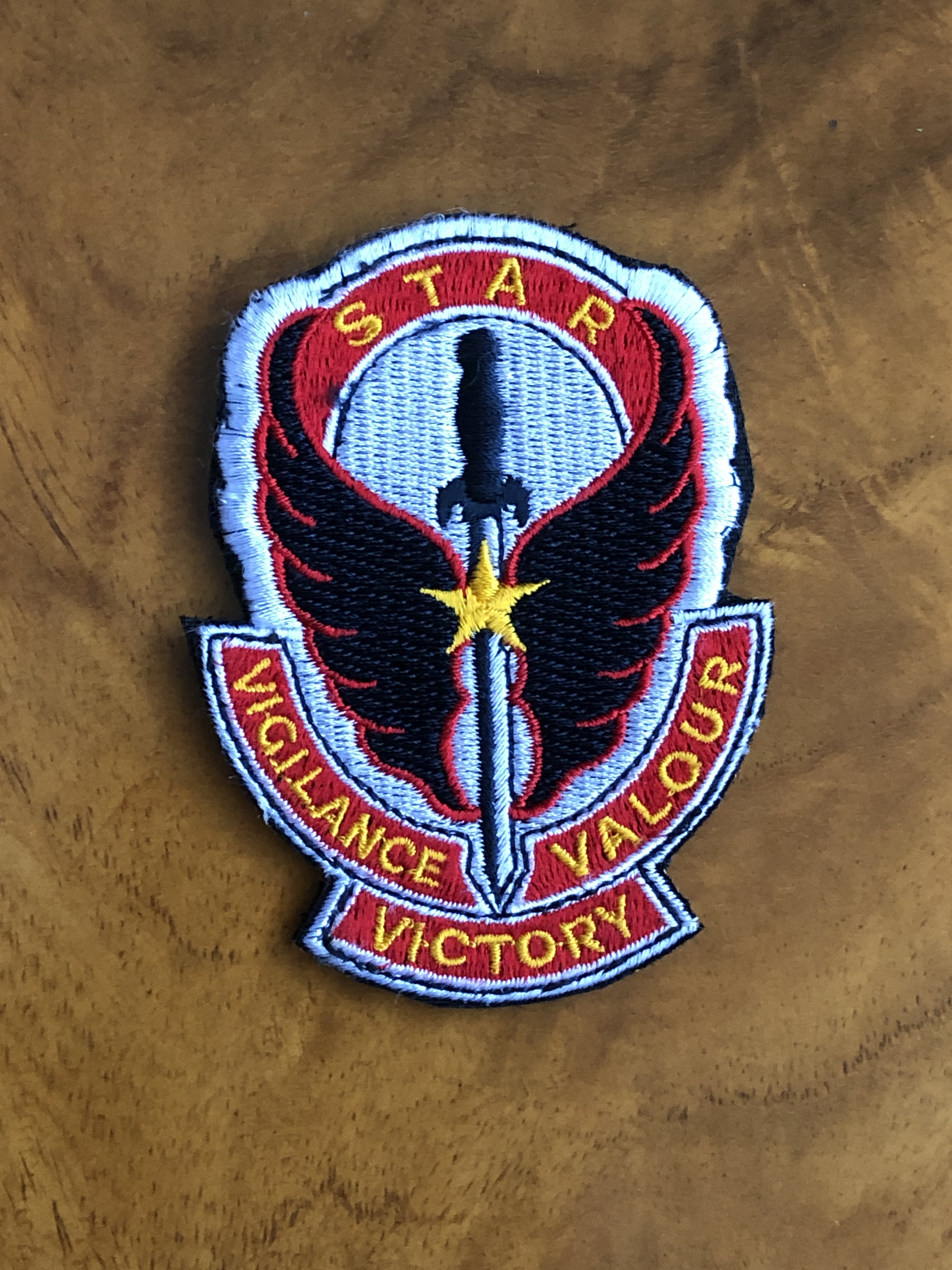
- Active: March 1978; 48 years ago (as Police Tactical Team); 9 November 1993; 33 years ago (as Special Tactics and Rescue)
- Country: Singapore
- Agency: Singapore Police Force
- Type: Police tactical unit
- Role: Law enforcement; Counter-terrorism; Hostage rescue
- Part of: Special Operations Command
- Headquarters: Queensway Base
- Motto: "Vigilance, Valour, Victory"
- Abbreviation: STAR

The Special Tactics and Rescue (STAR) is the tactical unit of the Singapore Police Force and is responsible for conducting counter-terrorism and hostage rescue operations in Singapore. It is under operational control of the SPF's Special Operations Command.

== History ==
Founded in March 1978 as the Police Tactical Team, it was a part-time outfit mainly used to contain civil disorder. During its infant days, the Police Tactical Team was a motley crew of volunteer officers from the Police Task Force, who served even on their days off for a monthly allowance of S$50.

The Police Tactical Team, although drawing expertise from the Police Task Force, were still limited in their operational readiness, skills, and capability. The hijacking of Singapore Airlines Flight 117 and the subsequent successful recovery by the Commandos from the Singapore Armed Forces' Special Operations Force in 1991 highlighted the need to provide the Singapore Police Force with a dedicated armed response team.

With the expertise, and assistance of the Hong Kong Police Force's Special Duties Unit, the United Kingdom's Special Air Service, Germany's GSG 9, France's GIGN, and the United States Delta Force, the Police Tactical Team was re-formed into STAR under Special Operations Command. The unit was commissioned on 9 November 1993.

After 9/11, the unit was also planned to undertake counter-terrorism duties. In 2005, STAR acquired a new maritime assault capability to augment the Police Coast Guard and the Republic of Singapore Navy in dealing with maritime threats.

== Operations ==
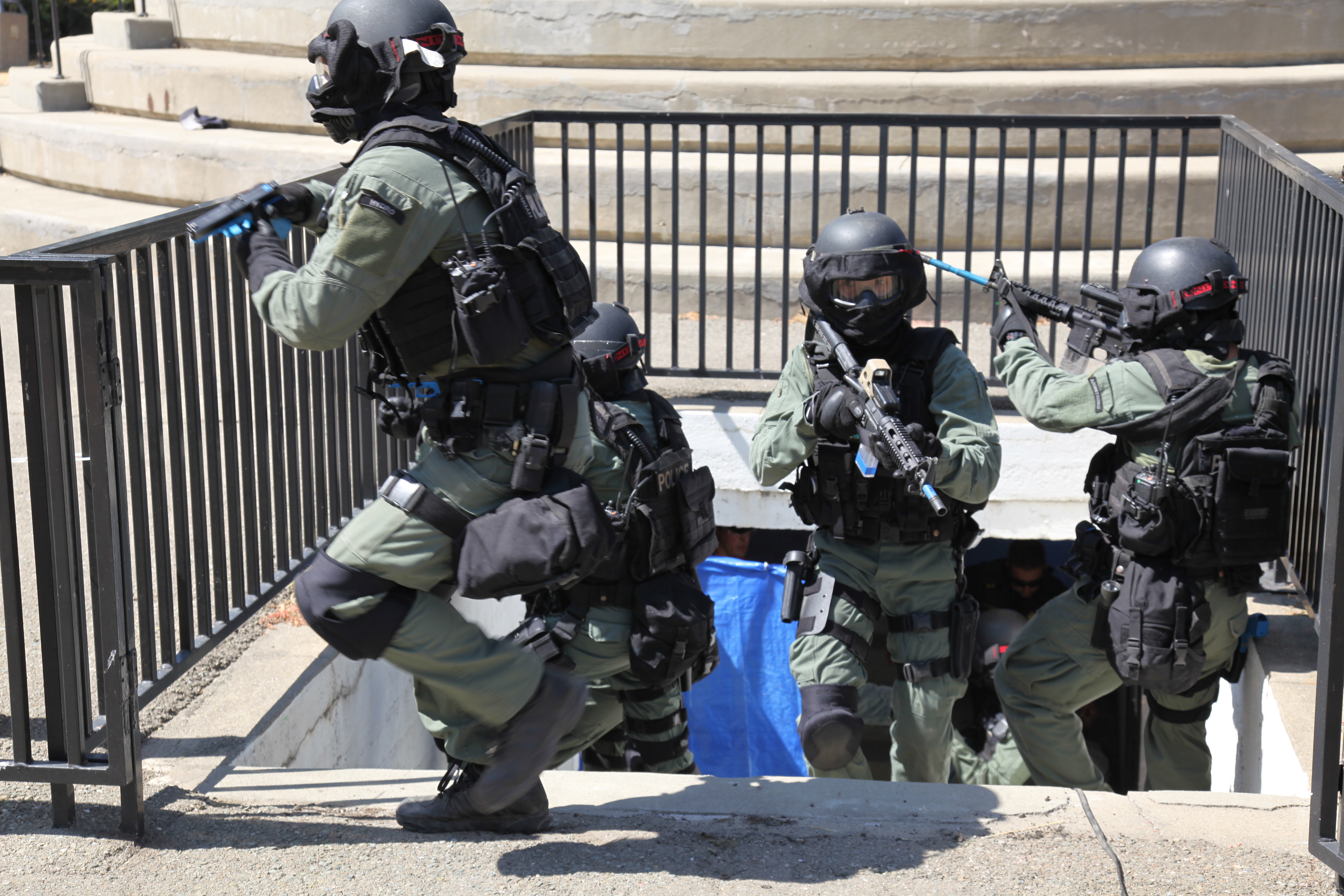
STAR operators conducting overseas training in San Leandro, California.

On 8 May 1998, STAR apprehended Anthony Tan Cheng Lock, a drug addict who had earlier shot a police officer in the thigh and stole his service revolver at a housing estate in Woodlands the previous night, after violently resisting arrest. Tan committed suicide by shooting himself in the head with the stolen revolver after STAR troopers breached the flat. Tan had been admitted into the drug rehabilitation centre five times for drug consumption from 1982 to 1993 and was wanted by Central Narcotics Bureau (CNB) for skipping mandatory reporting dates under a drug supervision order prior to his death.

In 2007, STAR was involved in the arrest of Dave Teo Ming, a National Serviceman who was AWOL and armed with a rifle and live ammunition, at the Orchard Cineleisure Mall without firing a shot.

In 2016, STAR responded to two separate hostage situations in the flats of Ang Mo Kio and Sembawang, in which both events involved stand-offs for more than ten hours.

In May 2018, STAR was involved in a covert operation to swiftly apprehend two Taiwanese weapons smugglers who were part of an organised crime syndicate that was busted in Taiwan but escaped to Singapore.

== Selection and training ==
Application to join the STAR unit is open to both public and police officers through the open recruitment exercise every year around October to December.

In order to get the best people for the job, the unit holds an intensive and rigorous selection process. During this process, candidates have to undergo a full-day screening to evaluate both their physical and mental capabilities. After which, they are put through psychological assessments and an interview is conducted by an interview panel. Successful applicants will be notified to undergo a final medical review before starting their intensive eight-month training and orientation.

It is reported that 10% of potential candidates get accepted after the end of the course. STAR operators are trained in specialised roles as assaulters, snipers, assault divers or tactical K-9 handlers with some trained to have explosives for breaching missions.

STAR operators do routine training at the Home Team Tactical Centre.

== See also ==
- Singapore Prisons Emergency Action Response
