= Special Operations Command (Singapore) =

Unit of the Singapore Police Force

- Motto: To uphold the law, maintain order and keep the peace in the Republic of Singapore

Agency overview
- Formed: 10 September 1992; 34 years ago

Jurisdictional structure
- Operations jurisdiction: Singapore
- Specialist jurisdiction: Paramilitary law enforcement, counter insurgency, riot control

Operational structure
- Agency executives: SAC Arthur Law Kok Leong, Commander Special Operations; AC Koh Tee Meng, Deputy Commander
- Parent agency: Singapore Police Force

The Special Operations Command (SOC) is a specialist tactical unit of the Singapore Police Force (SPF) specialising in riot control and high-threat incidents. It was formed on 10 September 1992 to unify specialist units into a single strategic reserve force that the regular officers need to call upon in any contingency plan and serious case of public disorder.

The current commander of the SOC is Senior Assistant Commissioner of Police (SAC) Arthur Law Kok Leong and the deputy commander is Assistant Commissioner of Police (AC) Koh Tee Meng.

== Structure and units ==
There are multiple full-time units under the SOC:

- Police Tactical Unit (PTU)
- Special Tactics and Rescue (STAR)
- Police K-9 Unit

In addition, there are auxiliary units who hold primary duties elsewhere in the SPF but have secondary appointments in these units when needed:

- Crisis Negotiation Unit (CNU)
- Special Women Task Team (SWTT)
- United Nations Peacekeeping Force (UNPKF)

In addition, there is also a Tactical Training School (TTS), a training department under SOC for their trainings, basic and advance courses for public order, public security, tactical competency and curriculum development at Queensway Base.

== History ==
=== 1952–1965: Establishment of unit ===
Following the 1950 Maria Hertogh riots which killed 18, the Riot Squad was formed in June 1952 with 60 police officers at Kampong Batak in Jalan Eunos, to be trained in riot suppression.

In October 1952, it was renamed the Reserve Unit (RU), and had grown to three troops of 50 officers each. It became operational in December 1952, with ASP J H Davies as its first officer-in-charge. In August 1955, the RU moved to its first permanent base in Mount Vernon. It also further acquired missions in search and rescue. Using lessons from the Hock Lee bus riots and Chinese middle schools riots, the RU was further upgraded with tear gas and smoke grenades, and also trained the rest of the police force in riot tactics. The RU was also expanded with a fourth troop specialising in illegal strikes and was based in the Old Hill Street Police Station, led by ASP Michael Chai.

During the merger of Singapore and Malaysia, the RU was supplemented by manpower from the Federal Reserve Unit (FRU) of Malaysia. When Singapore was subsequently expelled from Malaysia on 9 August 1965, the FRU withdrew from Singapore and the RU had to train additional officers to occupy the vacancies.

=== 1965–present: Post-independence ===
It was renamed the Police Reserve Unit (PRU). By late 1965, there were 5 PRUs totalling 15 troops.

On 10 September 1992, the SOC was formally created to combine the Police Task Force, the Police Tactical Team, and the Police Dog Unit under one command. In 1993, the Special Tactics and Rescue was formed to replace the Police Tactical Team. Greater involvement of Police National Servicemen was seen with the inclusion of the Key Installation National Servicemen (KINS) Unit in 1994, and the formation of the Police National Service Full-time Light Strike Force in 1998.

In response to changing demands in urban security issues, the Police MRT Unit was formed in 2005 to provide armed security within and around stations and trains on the Mass Rapid Transit network. Pooled from both regular and NSF manpower resources, they are the first SOC unit to be formed which involves regular front-line policing from inception. From 15 August 2009, the unit was renamed as the Public Transport Security Command and became an independent unit, separating from the SOC.

Under the Police Workplan Seminar 2017, a new National Servicemen unit called the Public Order Troop, a comeback formation of the Police National Service Full-time Light Strike Force, was formed in September 2018 under PTU and it can be called upon to work alongside their regular counterparts during major incidents such as riots, national emergencies and public order incidents, as well as possible terrorist attacks, and the POT will be implemented in the year 2023.

The SOC also sets up and coordinates the specially trained Peacekeeping Force personnel for missions overseas under command of the United Nations Department of Peacekeeping Operations.

== Engagements ==
- May 1955: Hock Lee bus riots
- 1956: Chinese middle schools riots
- July 1963: Pulau Senang prison riot
- November 1979: Tiong Bahru bus hijacking
- December 2013: 2013 Little India riot

== Incidents ==
- In the early morning of 25 April 1978, Constable Lee Kim Lai was abducted while he was performing sentry duties at the Police Reserve Unit (PRU) 1 base at Mount Vernon, and found stabbed to death in a taxi later.
- On 17 May 1978, SGT Toh Say Tin from the PRU 1 was on special duties when he slipped and fell overboard while attempting to board a boat from marine police speedboat PA 6 off Marine Parade. A non-swimmer, he was not wearing a life vest, and was swept away by the currents. His body was found on 19 May 1978 about eight kilometres from the incident.

== Equipment ==
=== Tactical Vehicle (TAV) ===
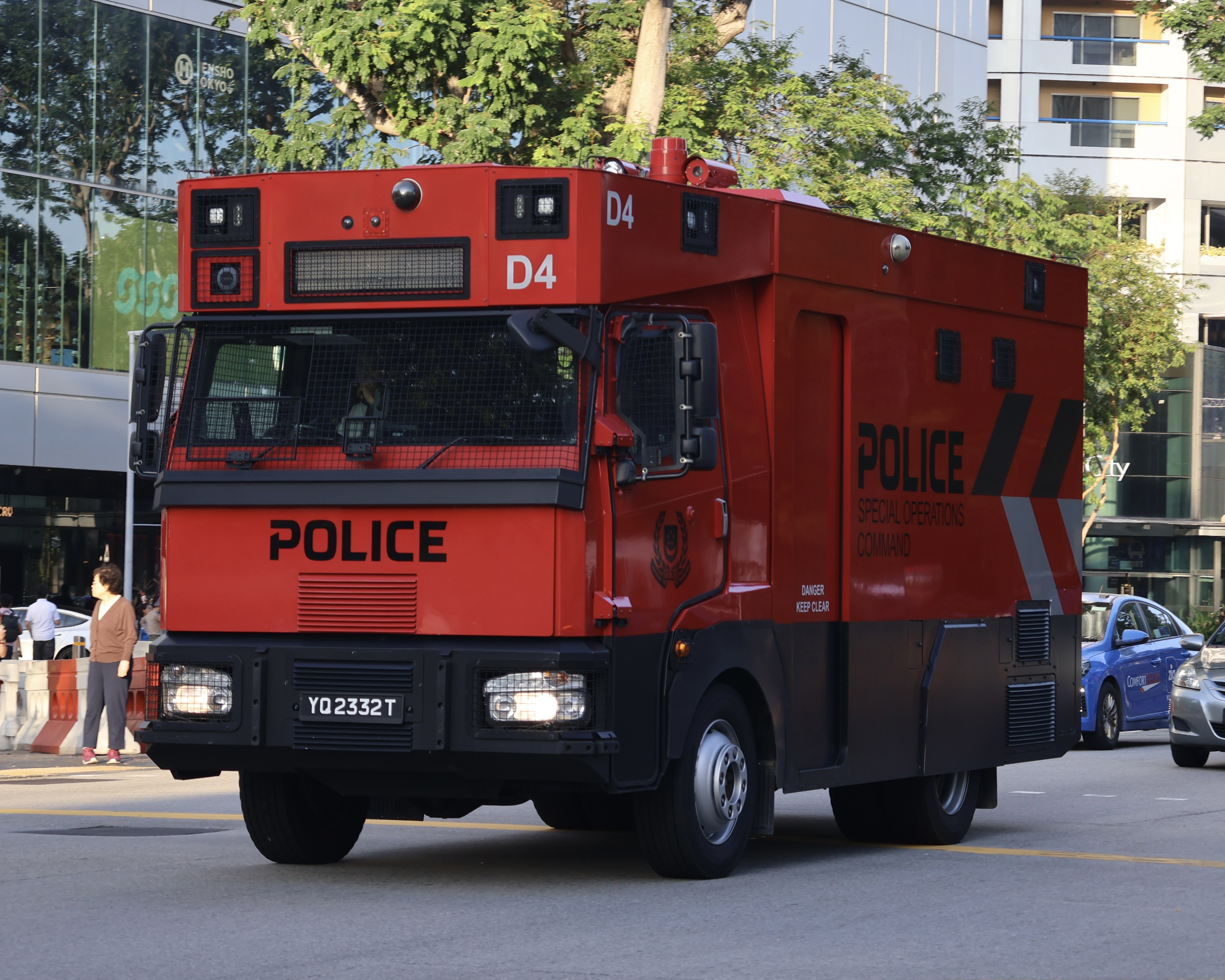
A red Tactical Vehicle (TAV)

The TAV is the main vehicle used by SOC PTU in attending Public Order and Public Security incidents. This vehicle is also better known as "Ang Chia".

=== Tactical Response Motorcycle (TRM) ===
SOC PTU have also included the use of motorcycles in attending to situations faster, especially when traffic is congested.

=== Tactical Strike Vehicle (TSV) ===
The TSV is newly added to the SOC PTU in support of major incidents.

=== Water Cannon ===
The SOC have the support of a water cannon vehicle to disperse major crowd and riot.

=== Armoury ===
The SOC has been reported to use the following firearms:

Model	Type	Origin
CZ P-07	Semi-automatic pistol	Czech Republic
HK USP	Semi-automatic pistol	Germany
HK MP5	Submachine gun	Germany
HK69	Grenade launcher	Germany
FN SCAR	Assault rifle	Belgium
Taurus M85	Revolver	Brazil
P4.1 VKS	Less lethal	United States
