= Singapore Police Force Crisis Negotiation Unit =

Coordinates: 1°17′42.41″N 103°48′01.76″E

- Abbreviation: CNU

Agency overview
- Formed: 1st May 2002
- Preceding agency: Negotiation Team
- Employees: 100

Jurisdictional structure
- Operations jurisdiction: Singapore

Operational structure
- Parent agency: Special Operations Command

The Crisis Negotiation Unit (CNU) is a specialist unit of the Singapore Police Force under the umbrella of the Special Operations Command. Its teams of specially trained police officers are called upon to defuse life-threatening situations through verbal crisis negotiation techniques for a non-violent resolution. Its precursor is the Negotiation Team which was involved in the Singapore Airlines Flight 117

== History ==
CNU was formed in 2002, under the Special Operations Command (Singapore), focusing on the terrorism negotiation before expanding to other fields involving hostage situations, barricaded incidents or stand off situations.

The team is made up of police officers and psychologists who volunteer to join CNU as their secondary appointment on top of their duties. There are a total of 4 teams, where at least one team being on stand by at any one time.

== Notable Incidents ==
In 2003, a foreign national threatened to jump of a seven-story high crane in Yio Chu Kang, members of CNU spent 21 hours convincing the foreign national to come down and was ultimately successful.

Officers from the CNU were deployed overseas for the first time to aid in the handling of victims' families and relatives as a result of the 2004 Indian Ocean earthquake.

In 2016, a man locked himself and his girlfriend's two-year old son in a flat in Sembawang. Members of CNU negotiated with him for over 17 hours before members of the Special Operations Command breached and entered the apartment. The man was arrested for wrongful confinement and drug-related charges.
