= Police K-9 Unit =

Singapore Police Force canine unit

Coordinates: 1°23′49.60″N 103°44′31.12″E

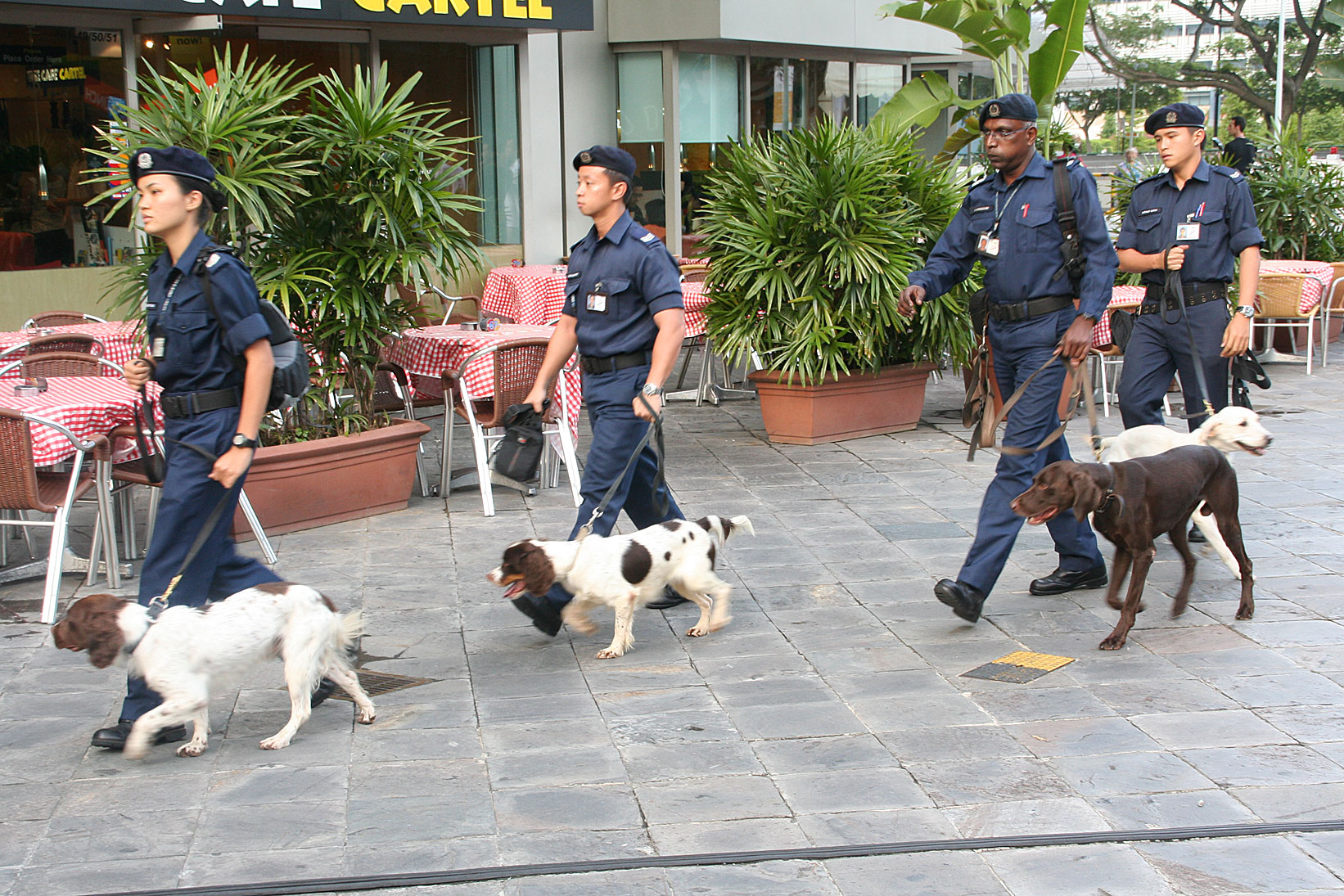
Police K-9 Unit dog handlers with their charges during the 117th IOC Session held at Raffles City.

The Police K-9 Unit, formerly the Police Dog Unit (PDU) is a specialist force of the Singapore Police Force (SPF) under the direct command of the Special Operations Command. It specialises in the training of police dogs in explosive detection, drug detection, guard duties, anti-crime operations, helping detain criminals, and general purposes. The Police K-9 Unit works in collaboration with the rest of the SPF and the Home Team.

== Historical background ==
Dogs were first used in police work in Singapore when an Airedale Terrier was acquired from a British army officer to aid in the search of escaped prisoners in 1911, although this was ceased prematurely the following year when the dog perished. They did not return until the 1950s, when the positive experiences of utilising police dogs in the United Kingdom demonstrated their usefulness. This prompted the Singapore authorities to send Chief Inspector Frank C Pestana to the Metropolitan Dog Training School for a 3-month Dog Instructor Course in 1954.

Upon his return with four German Shepherds, the forerunner of the PDU was established at the Police Training School (now the Training Command) at Thomson Road in 1955.

These dogs were used for a variety of roles, including the suppression of secret society activities, crowd control, anti-house breaking patrols and the tracking of criminals. The Customs & Excise Department's canine unit and Prisons Department's canine unit were absorbed in 1987 and 1995 respectively. The last remaining canine unit under Singapore's group of domestic law enforcement agencies, belonging to Singapore Civil Defence Force was colocated with the Police K-9 Unit.

The Police K-9 Unit has since grown to over 250 dogs today. Its new base at Mowbray Road was officially opened on 31 January 2004, having moved to the Choa Chu Kang site from the old Mowbray Camp at Ulu Pandan Road together with the Military Police Command from the Singapore Armed Forces
