= Taurus Model 85 =

Model 85
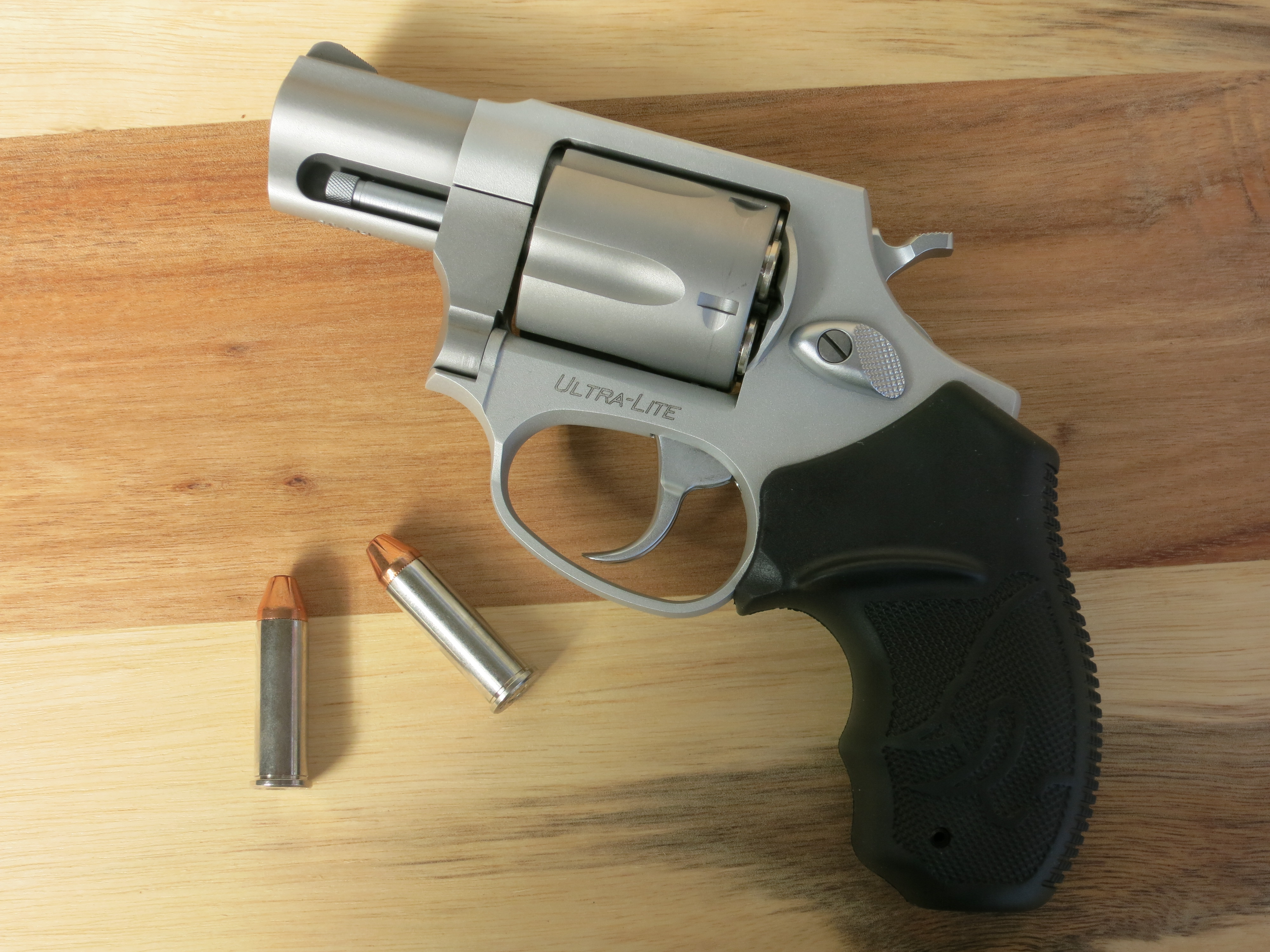
- A Model 85 Ultra-Lite, which features an alloy frame.
- Type: Revolver
- Place of origin: Brazil

Service history
- Used by: See Users

Production history
- Produced: 1980–2017 (85); 2018–present (856)

Specifications
- Barrel length: 50.8 mm or 76.2 mm
- Width: 34.2 mm
- Height: 109 mm
- Cartridge: .38 Special +P
- Action: Double action/single action
- Feed system: 5 shot cylinder
- Sights: fixed front sight

The Taurus Model 85 is a small-frame revolver manufactured by Taurus International, being one of their signature weapons.

== Overview ==
In the United States, the guns are marketed for concealed carry and personal protection.

There are a number of significant internal differences between the Taurus 85 and similar Smith & Wesson revolvers.

Because of these differences, Taurus has been able to keep costs relatively low.

However, those same differences can make customization of the Model 85 more expensive.

== Design ==
The Model 85 is available with either 2" or 3" barrels, is capable of firing +P rated .38 Special rounds, and utilizes a transfer bar safety.

Models manufactured after 1997 feature the Taurus Security System, which consists of a keyed, quarter-turn style socket-head screw which can be set to prevent the hammer from pivoting back into the frame, thus rendering the weapon inoperative.

The Model 85 is available in several configurations. These include blued steel, stainless steel, polymer frame, and "Ultralite" variants constructed of aluminum and titanium, with steel lockwork components.

Much like Smith & Wesson revolvers, Model 85s can come equipped with exposed, "bobbed" (850), or shrouded (851) hammers.

There are numerous cosmetic options, including gold-plated hardware and grips of wood or pearl.

== Variants ==
=== Taurus 856 ===
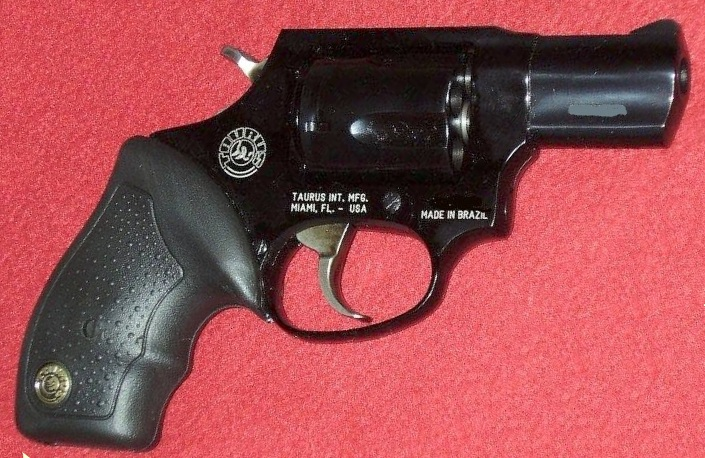
Taurus Model 85 in black

The Model 85 line has been enlarged to include the Model 856. This model is similar to the Model 85, but adds an additional round in the cylinder to bring the Model 856's capacity to 6 rounds. Other related models were the Taurus 856 Executive Grade, with include a three-inch barrel and stainless-steel construction and the barrel and underlug are machined as one piece.

=== Taurus 85VTA ===
The View, also known as the model 85VTA, was introduced in 2014. It has a 1.41 inch barrel, an aluminum frame and titanium cylinder, and a clear polycarbonate side plate for an unloaded weight of 9.5 ounces.

Unlike other models, the View is only rated for standard pressure .38 Special ammunition. Ultimately, the View was not a commercial success and was pulled from production in December 2014. A revised model, the "No View" with an aluminum side plate replacing the clear one, was introduced in 2015.

==== Reception ====
Reviews on the 85VTA were mixed. Author Massad Ayoob found the View he shot had accuracy problems and lead bullets tended to "prairie dog" (protrude forward from the recoil) and bind the cylinder.

Another reviewer did not have those problems when testing the gun.

== Users ==
- Singapore
  - Singapore Police Force
    - Remain in use by auxiliary units
    - Issued to frontline officers in 2002, being replaced by the Glock 19
  - Singapore Prison Service
  - Immigration and Checkpoints Authority

== Criminal Incidents ==
The revolver was used by Guilherme Taucci Monteiro, and Luiz Henrique de Castro during the Suzano Massacre

Yolanda Saldívar used the revolver to murder Tejano singer Selena in Corpus Christi on March 31, 1995.

== See also ==
- Taurus Model 605
