= Police Tactical Unit (Singapore) =

Paramilitary specialist unit of the Singapore Police Force

Coordinates: 1°17′42.41″N 103°48′01.76″E

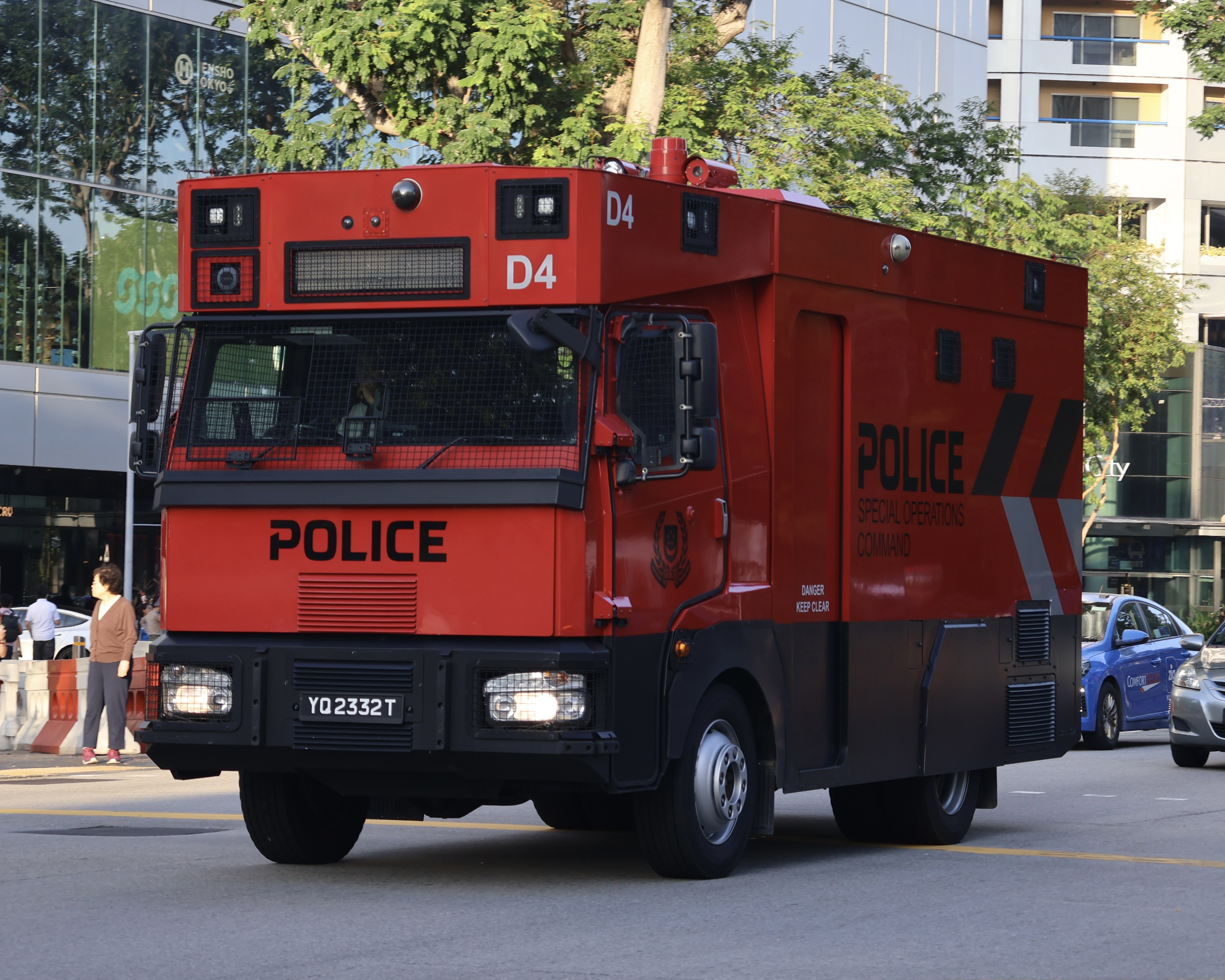
The red anti-riot Tactical Vehicle (TAV) is one of the most well-recognised icons of the Singapore PTU amongst the local population, commonly referred to as the Ang Chia (literally "Red Vehicle" in Hokkien).

The Police Tactical Unit (PTU) is a paramilitary specialist unit of the Singapore Police Force and comes under the direct command of the Special Operations Command.

== History ==
=== Early Days ===
The PTU traces its history back to the early 1950s, when the Maria Hertogh riots demonstrated the incapability of existing law enforcement measures to contain situations of mass rioting and other disturbances to public peace. Hence, in 1952, the first Riot Squad was formed with 60 junior officers deliberately chosen from a wide range of ethnic backgrounds, and who had been screened to ensure no relations to any political party or faction. These officers underwent rigorous (military) training conducted by Colonel William E. Fairbairn, who was formerly the Assistant Commissioner of the Shanghai Municipal Police Armed Reserve.

These officers formed the first riot control squad, which became operational in December 1952 as the Reserve Unit (RU). Their responsibilities included crowd control, riot control, and the provision of assistance during natural calamities such as fires and floods, thus, three specially trained squads were formed.

In 1953, the squad was reorganised into 3 troops of 50 men each and renamed the Police Reserve Unit (PRU), with PRU 1 stationed at Mount Vernon Camp, PRU 2 at Queensway Base and PRU 3 at Jalan Bahar Camp. The unit would later come to be known as the Police Task Force (PTF) following the merger of all three Reserved Units and would be permanently based at Queensway Base.

=== Modern times ===
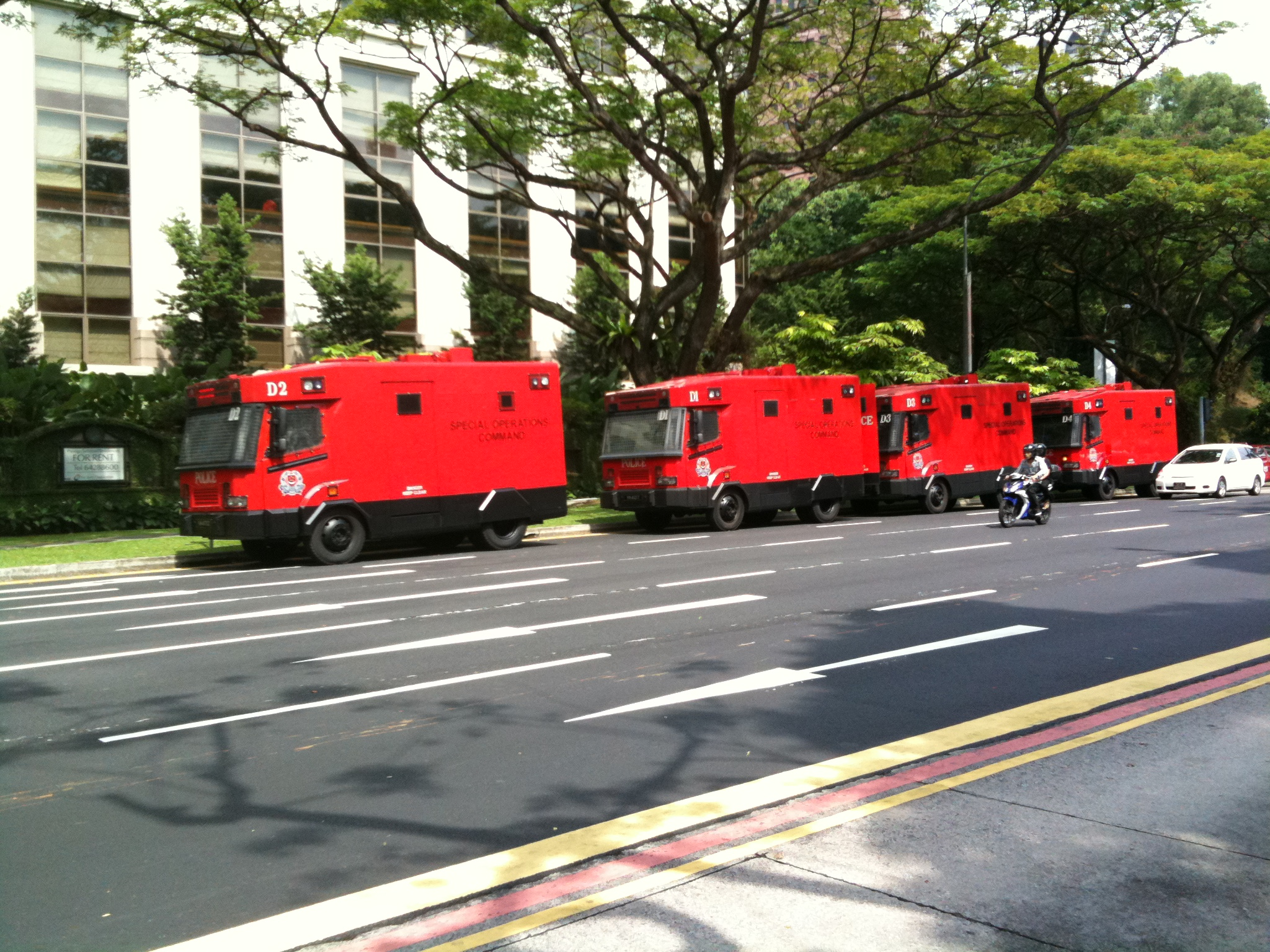
Modern Ang Chia anti-riot vehicles parked on the side of a road somewhere in Orchard.

In response to increasingly complicated and multi-faceted public safety and security requirements in contemporary environments, the PTF underwent another major review in 2003, this time with upgraded weaponry and vehicles, a change to their tactical uniforms in 2005, and the renaming of the unit as the Police Tactical Unit (PTU).

Wong Kan Seng, Deputy Prime Minister and Home Affairs Minister, oversaw the acquisition of the PETRA (Patrol, Escort, Tactical Response Van) vehicles alongside Police Tactical Squad (PTS) and Troop Tactical Vehicle (TTV) vans for the use of the PTU alongside the rest of the SOC in 2006, just in time for the IMF World Bank Summit in Singapore. The first two vans resemble Ford Transit Vans.

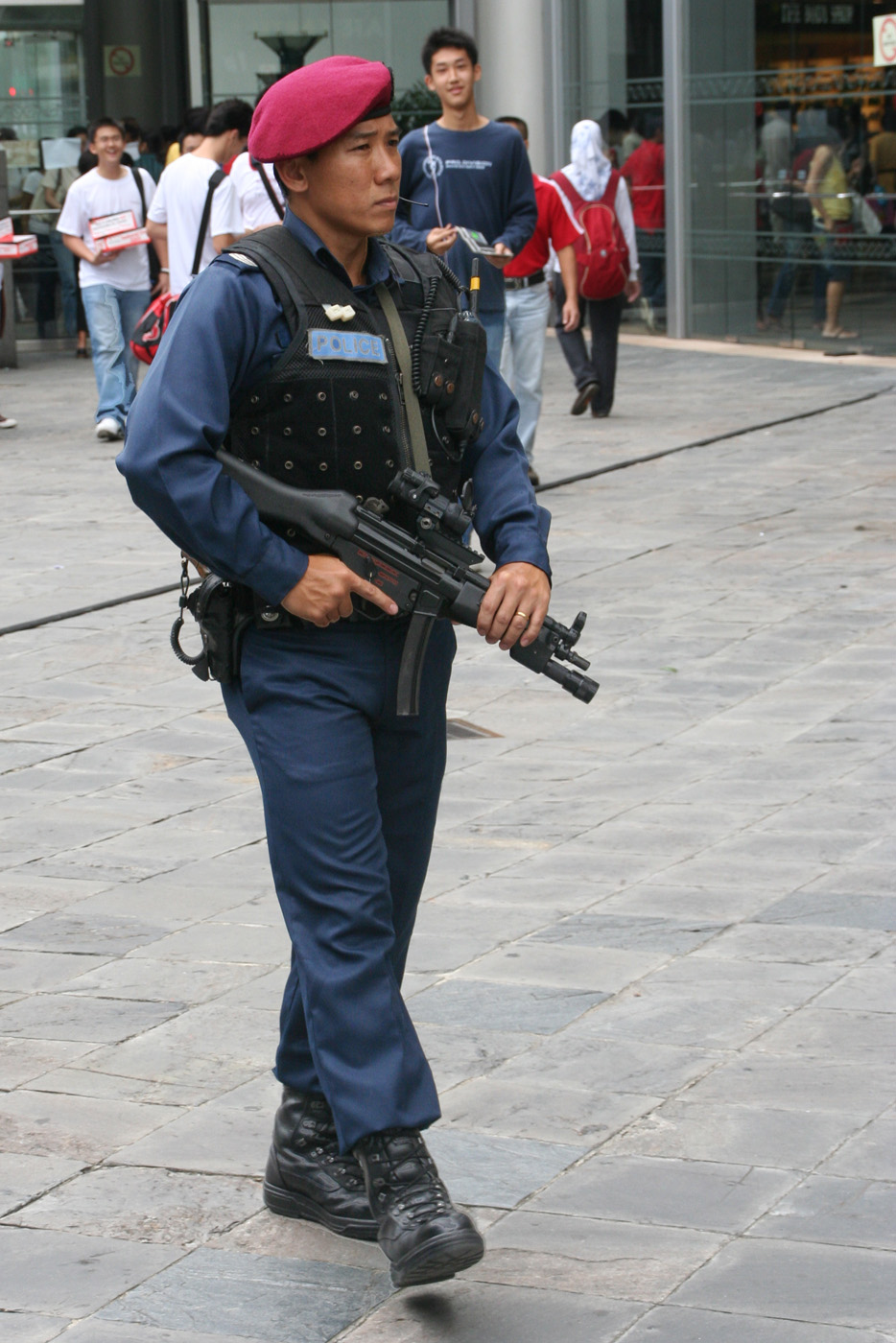
A PTU officer on patrol at Raffles City during a rehearsal for the National Day Parade in 2005. He wore a transitional attire consisting of the new red beret together with the old combat uniform.

The unit is currently conducting counter-terrorist duties such as security duties in order to deter terrorist threats in Singapore alongside other police units.

The PTU also has sub-units; Armed Strike Teams, Rapid Deployment Troops and its National Servicemen Unit called Public Order Troops that was formed in September 2018. The POT, once fully implemented in 2023, will work alongside its regular counterparts in major events such as riots, national emergencies, and public order incidents, as well as possible terrorist attacks.

In March 2026, the Enhanced Tactical Vehicles (ETVs) were publicly unveiled.

=== Incidents ===
In the early morning of 25 April 1978, Constable Lee Kim Lai was abducted while he was performing sentry duties at the PRU 1 base at Mount Vernon, and found stabbed to death in a taxi later.

On 17 May 1978, SGT Toh Say Tin from the PRU 1 was on special duties when he slipped and fell overboard while attempting to board a boat from marine police speedboat PA 6 off Marine Parade. A non-swimmer, he was not wearing a life vest, and was swept away by the currents. His body was found on 19 May about eight kilometres from the incident.

== Organization ==
The PTU is under the operational command of the Special Operations Command with the K-9 unit and the STAR unit.

Based in Queenstown, it is the main anti-rioting and disaster-management unit of the police force. They are also called upon to handle cases of serious crime in progress, particularly cases involving firearms. From 2004, PTU officers also presented greater public prominence when they conducted patrols in public areas, such as at Orchard Road, Holland Village and Serangoon Gardens Estate, partly as a response to greater terrorism concerns.

=== Uniforms ===
Back then, the Police Tactical Unit officers have traditionally worn the police No.4 combat dress. This consists of a blue beret, long-sleeved blue polyester shirt with concealed plastic buttons, black combat belt, blue combat trousers, and black combat boots. The sleeves may be folded up during the day and rolled down at dusk or during tactical training and operations.

In 2005, the uniform underwent a major review, and a newer combat uniform was introduced. The red beret was introduced to facilitate ease of spotting PTU officers in the event of a major crowd control incident. The combat uniform was also redesigned to a more loose-fitting attire with utility pockets, and the material changed to a cotton-polyester mix which is more durable and fire resistant. The colour of the uniform is also changed to a darker shade of blue for tactical purposes. High-heel boots with garters were also introduced.

Currently, the Police Tactical Unit are wearing fire retardant uniform for operational effectiveness and common usage. The blue police No.4 uniforms are still being used for events, trainings, courses and other deployments.

=== Training ===
PTU officers have opportunities for joint training with foreign units, including the HKPF's Police Tactical Unit, the Korean National Police Agency's Special Weapons and Tactics Unit, and the French National Police's Compagnies Républicaines de Sécurité and RAID tactical unit.

== Equipment ==
The PTU regular troopers are equipped with a variegated arsenal of weapons such as riot gears, batons, pepper spray, HK69 grenade launcher, less lethal P4.1 VKS, HK USP sidearm pistol and the FN SCAR mid range weapon

The PTU PNSF troopers used to have Taurus M85 sidearm revolver, which was replaced with Glock 19 in 2022; along with HK MP5 submachine gun.

=== Firearms ===
Model	Type	Origin
HK USP	Semi-automatic pistol	Germany
HK MP5	Submachine gun	Germany
HK69	Grenade launcher	Germany
FN SCAR	Assault rifle	Belgium
Taurus M85	Revolver	Brazil
P4.1 VKS	Less lethal	United States
