= Murder of Boo Tiang Huat =

1994 case of a policeman murdered while in line of duty

Boo Tiang Huat
- Boo Tiang Huat, the police officer who was axed to death by Zainal Abidin.
- Born: Boo Tiang Huat; 1947; Singapore
- Died: 30 November 1994 (aged 47); Newton Road, Singapore
- Cause of death: Murdered
- Occupation: Police officer
- Employer: Singapore Police Force
- Known for: Murder victim
- Title: Senior Staff Sergeant (before death); Station Inspector (posthumous)
- Spouse: Chew Tuan Jong
- Children: Boo Bin Bin (eldest child; daughter); Boo Shan Shan (middle child; daughter); Boo Jia Liang (youngest child; son)

On 30 November 1994, Senior Staff Sergeant (SSSgt) Boo Tiang Huat (巫镇发 Wū Zhènfā) of the Singapore Police Force and his partner were on their routine spot checks when they encountered a man behaving suspiciously, and approached him to check his identity. However, the 27-year-old ex-convict Zainal Abidin Abdul Malik retrieved an axe from his black bag and used it to strike Boo on the head, which killed the 47-year-old policeman instantly. Zainal Abidin was subsequently arrested and charged with murder. Boo was posthumously promoted as Station Inspector (SI) after his death, as a recognition of his contributions to the police force from 1973 to 1992, and from 1993 and 1994, when he ended his retirement and re-joined the force.

Zainal Abidin, who was previously jailed and caned for armed robbery and housebreaking, claimed in his trial that he had no intention to fatally assault the police officer and also raised another defence of diminished responsibility to rebut the murder charge, but he was found to have intentionally murdered Boo and was deemed mentally sound at the time of the offence, hence Zainal Abidin was found guilty of murdering Boo and sentenced to death, and his execution took place at Changi Prison on 30 August 1996. Boo Tiang Huat remains as the last police officer to be murdered while in the line of duty in Singapore till this day.

== Background and murder ==
=== Boo Tiang Huat's life and career ===
Boo Tiang Huat was born in Singapore during the British colonial period in 1947. Boo first joined the Singapore Police Force in 1973, and he gradually rose through the ranks, attaining the post of deputy OC of the Whitley NPP, a position he held from November 1989 until 1992, when he retired at age 45. Later, he was re-employed by the police force in 1993 and returned to his old post. By the time of his death in 1994, Boo attained the rank of Senior Staff Sergeant (SSSgt). During his two decades of employment in the force, Boo was often recognized and awarded for his meritorious service and responsibility as an officer, including the Police's High Commendation award in 1993, and in October 1994, a month prior to his murder, Boo received a Commander's Award.

Boo was married to a clerk named Chew Tuan Jong, and together, the couple had three children - two daughters Bin Bin (aged 15 in 1994) and Shan Shan (aged 13 in 1994), and a son Jia Liang (aged seven in 1994).

=== Last patrol duty and death ===
On the early morning of 30 November 1994, both Boo and his partner, Corporal Muhaimin bin Mawasi, were at Newton Road carrying out their usual patrol duty when they noticed a man behaving suspiciously near Goldhill Plaza. The officers approached the man (Zainal), who was carrying a black bag, and they inquired about his identity and asked for his ID card as part of the routine check which police should perform while on patrol.

The man (zainal) took out an axe and violently swung it at Boo's head, and as he collapsed on the ground, 47-year-old Boo Tiang Huat died instantly on the spot due to the fatal head injury. Corporal Muhaimin quickly gave chase after the suspect, before he returned again to the scene to tend to his fallen partner. The ambulance arrived soon after and paramedics pronounced Boo dead at the scene.

The police cordoned off the area and searched the whole area for the suspect, with the tracker dogs deployed to sniff for the suspect. Soon after the incident, a 24-year-old handphone exporter named Geoffrey Yeo Yap Hin (杨业兴 Yáng Yèxīng), who was driving to meet up with a friend for supper, spotted the suspect running from the crime scene and towards an open field around Khiang Guan Avenue. Mistaking the man as a hit-and-run suspect, Yeo alerted a passing patrol car about the sighting, and more than 70 officers went to the place, and eventually cornered the suspect at a private apartment block of Lincolnsvile. At 3: 30 am, the suspect was finally arrested at the sixth floor of the condominium building, which was 500m away from the place where he allegedly murdered Boo. Yeo, who was later commended by the police for his assistance in apprehending the killer, was shocked when he later realize the man was a murder suspect, but he nevertheless offered condolences to Boo's family.

In light of the suspect's capture, Police Commissioner Tee Tua Ba condemned the man's violence against a police officer and stated that any suspects who acted defiantly against lawful authority, especially those that commit acts of violence, would not be spared from the "full force of law." Commissioner Tee also expressed that the police and prosecution would pursue a preliminary murder charge against the suspect, who had several previous convictions, for the killing of Boo.

The murder of Boo Tiang Huat was the second case where a police officer was killed in 1994. In May of that year, just six months before Boo was killed, Corporal Hoi Kim Heng was knifed to death by a drug addict while he was discharging his duties, and the killer, 50-year-old Soh Loo Ban, was subsequently gunned down by police after he injured another police corporal, Tan Huang Yee (who survived his injuries).

== Subsequent developments ==
=== Posthumous promotion and funeral ===
After his death, Boo was posthumously promoted to Station Inspector (SI) as a recognition of his meritorious service to the force and this promotion letter was sent to his 45-year-old wife. Home Affairs Minister Wong Kan Seng and Permanent Secretary (Home Affairs) Peter Chan were among those offering condolences to the fallen officer's bereaved family.

Boo's funeral took place on 4 December 1994, and he was cremated with full honours on that same day, with his bereaved family, including his wife and three children (aged between seven and 15), and about 400 police officers (including Police Commissioner Tee Tua Ba and Superintendent Lum Hon Fye of the Tanglin Police Division) attending the funeral. The event was reportedly solemn and filled with heartbreak, especially when Boo's widow, who wept openly in public, had to be supported by her relatives throughout the ceremony.

=== Murder charge of suspect ===
Meanwhile, the 27-year-old suspect, identified as Zainal Abidin Abdul Malik (also spelt Zainul Abidin Abdul Malik) who was previously imprisoned for armed robbery and housebreaking, was charged with murder on 1 December 1994. Under Section 302 of the Penal Code, a conviction for murder by the courts would result in the mandatory imposition of the death penalty in Singapore.

Two weeks later, Zainal Abidin was also additionally charged in court with vandalism and attempting to escape the prison cell where he was held in remand. The maximum penalty would be two years' jail and a fine for attempted escape from police custody, while one who was found guilty of vandalism would potentially receive the maximum sentence of three years' imprisonment, a fine of S$2,000 and eight strokes of the cane.

== Trial of Zainal Abidin Abdul Malik ==
=== Background of Zainal Abidin ===
Zainal Abidin Abdul Malik
- Born: 1967; Singapore
- Died: 30 August 1996 (aged 29); Changi Prison, Singapore
- Cause of death: Execution by hanging
- Other name: Zainul Abidin Abdul Malik
- Status: Executed
- Convictions: Theft (one count; 1981); Housebreaking (two counts; 1981 and 1983); Armed robbery (one count; 1988); Murder (one count; 1994)
- Penalty: Probation (1981); Three years' reformative training (1983); Three years' jail and 12 strokes of the cane (1988); Death penalty (1995)
- Accomplice: Unnamed accomplice (Housebreaking)

Details
- Victims: 1 dead, 3+ alive
- Date: 1981, 1983, 1987, 30 November 1994
- Country: Singapore
- Date apprehended: 1981, 1983, 1987, 30 November 1994

Born in 1967, Zainal Abidin Abdul Malik was the seventh of eight children in his family. Zainal Abidin's father died when he was merely five, and he was sent to an orphanage. Zainal Abidin often misbehaved even during his childhood, having run away from home several times before he started primary school, and he dropped out of secondary school at age 14, and also left the orphanage to fend for himself and he first found work as a cleaner at Lucky Plaza.

Zainal Abidin first ran afoul of the law by stealing a bicycle when he was 14. He was thus convicted and placed under probation for a year and assigned a job as a delivery assistant. However, Zainal Abidin re-offended during his probation period by mixing with ex-convicts and broke into houses with them, resulting in him receiving probation for four years. Zainal Abidin committed another housebreaking offence in 1983, resulting in him being sentenced to three years of reformative training before he was released and given an additional one-year probation.

In 1987, Zainal Abidin, who was just released from his probation, committed armed robbery and he was thus arrested. A year later, he was sentenced to three years' imprisonment and twelve strokes of the cane, and subsequently served his sentence at Changi Prison. During his term of incarceration, Zainal Abidin resumed his studies and received a certificate for passing his GCE N-levels in 1989. After he was released, Zainal Abidin went to work various jobs from time to time in the hotel industry, but he often perceived he was not given a chance for promotion due to his acne and appearance, and his educational background. Zainal Abidin also felt inferior due to his homosexuality, which he was raised to believe as an inappropriate sexual instinct through familial and Muslim beliefs. A former employer of Zainal Abidin described him as an "excellent worker" during his tenure of his employment at a hotel around Orchard Road from 1990 to 1991.

=== Court proceedings and defence ===
On 7 July 1995, 28-year-old Zainal Abidin Abdul Malik stood trial at the High Court for the murder of 47-year-old Boo Tiang Huat. Deputy Public Prosecutor Francis Tseng Cheng Kuang was the trial prosecutor while G. Raman represented Zainal Abidin as his lawyer. Judicial commissioner (JC) Kan Ting Chiu was appointed as the trial judge of the capital case.

In his defence, Zainal Abidin stated that he did not mean to use the axe to assault or kill Boo. He stated that on that day itself, he wanted to go to a hotel (also his former workplace) at Newton Road to commit armed robbery, and therefore he packed up his black bag, which contained his axe, two knives, a hammer, torchlight, and a pair of gloves. However, at the last minute, he chickened out and aborted the plan and wanted to return home to Toa Payoh. At the time he was trying to leave, he happened to be stopped by both Boo Tiang Huat and Corporal Muhaimin bin Mawasi. Zainal Abidin recounted that at that time, he was afraid of being caught for possessing a dangerous weapon and thought of randomly grabbing anything inside his bag as a weapon to distract the police before running away. When Zainal Abidin grabbed something with his right hand and swung it at Boo, he realized it was the axe he just grabbed. He insisted it was unintentional and it was an accident.

Private psychiatrist R. Nagulendran appeared as a witness to support Zainal Abidin's second defence of diminished responsibility. He presented that Zainal Abidin should not be held fully accountable for his actions as he had a delusional disorder that impaired his mental responsibility at the time of the crime, given that he had delusions of wanting to bomb several places in Singapore and assassinate both the Senior Minister and Prime Minister, and self-harm symptoms, as well as his own upbringing, his feelings of inferiority over his homosexuality and his hatred against the Chinese for being more successful than the minority races like Malays and Indians, which made him perceive that the police would often preferentially pick Malay people like him for routine spot checks instead of the Chinese or Indians. Dr Nagulendran also cited the mental health history of Zainal Abidin's family members like his mother, two brothers and one sister who had similar mental disorders, so as to support Zainal Abidin's diminished responsibility defence.

In rebuttal, the prosecution called upon Dr Chan Khim Yew, a government psychiatrist from the Changi Prison hospital. While Dr Chan agreed with Dr Nagulendran's diagnosis about Zainal Abidin's delusional thinking and ill feelings against the Chinese, he testified that despite the delusional thinking, Zainal Abidin was able to discern the difference between reality and imagination and did not put his delusions into action, and that he was able to think and decide swiftly on his feet while clamped down by fear during Boo's spot check of him, and had full control of his mental faculties at the time of the murder. DPP Tseng also argued that the prosecution's psychiatric evidence should be accepted as it showed that Zainal Abidin was not mentally abnormal at the time he committed the crime. As such, the prosecution asked the court to issue a guilty verdict of murder in Zainal Abidin's case.

== Death penalty ==
On 15 July 1995, five days after the conclusion of Zainal Abidin's trial, Judicial commissioner (JC) Kan Ting Chiu, the trial judge, delivered his verdict.

In the judgement, JC Kan found that Zainal Abidin was not suffering from an abnormality of the mind when he killed Boo Tiang Huat, given that he did not have difficulty in planning how to commit robbery, was able to tell the difference between reality and imagination, and could think of how to escape. He stated that even if Zainal Abidin indeed was delusional, it would not absolve him of his culpability in killing Boo, and there was no evidence that using the axe to assault Boo was the product of a psychiatric disorder.

JC Kan also judged that should Zainal Abidin have had no intention to kill or seriously hurt the police officer and only meant to escape, he would have chosen to grab any non-threatening objects like his gloves or torchlight, or perhaps even show his fist to give the impression that he was taking something before fleeing. The fact that Zainal Abidin randomly chose to grab the axe for his so-called distraction could only mean that he had the intention to murder Boo, or to at least cause serious injury to the police officer, which either way had led to the death of 47-year-old Boo Tiang Huat.

As such, 28-year-old Zainal Abidin Abdul Malik was found guilty of murder, and sentenced to death. When the death sentence was passed, Zainal Abidin was reportedly emotionless while hearing the verdict, and the families of both the defendant and murder victim were present to hear the judgement. Afterwards, Zainal Abidin's appeal against his sentence was dismissed by the Court of Appeal on 8 January 1996.

On the Friday morning of 30 August 1996, 29-year-old Zainal Abidin Abdul Malik was hanged at Changi Prison. On the same day, three other people - ex-prostitute Teo Kim Hong who killed her Malaysian friend Ching Bee Ing, Thai welder Thongbai Naklangdon who killed his compatriot and co-worker Suk Malasri, and Thai farmer Jeerasak Densakul who smuggled 2 kg of cannabis - were also executed at the same prison as Zainal Abidin.

== Aftermath ==
As of today, Boo Tiang Huat remains the last police officer from Singapore to be murdered in the line of duty.

After his death, Boo continued to receive posthumous recognitions for his service in the police force. On 9 August 1995, he and another fallen police officer Hoi Kim Heng (whose murderer was gunned down) both received the Police Medal of Valour. More than two decades later, on 3 August 2021, as a commemoration of the 200th anniversary of the Singapore Police Force, a medallion was issued to the families of policemen who died in the line of duty as a recognition of the fallen officers' contributions. Boo was one of the late officers honoured, and both his widow Chew Tuan Jong and the couple's only son Boo Jia Liang attended the ceremony.

In 2012, crime show In Cold Blood re-enacted the story of Zainal Abidin in the tenth episode of the show's second season. In the show, Zainal Abidin's name was changed to Rashid Salmud.

== See also ==
- Lim Ban Lim
- Hoi Kim Heng
- Murder of Lee Kim Lai
- Murder of Mirza Abdul Halim
- Capital punishment in Singapore
- List of major crimes in Singapore
- List of Singapore police officers killed in the line of duty
