= Murder of Mirza Abdul Halim =

1989 killing of a police constable in Singapore

Mirza Abdul Halim
- Mirza Abdul Halim, the police officer who was killed while pursuing a suspect
- Born: Mirza Abdul Halim bin Mirza Abdul Majid; 1966; Singapore
- Died: 16 February 1989 (aged 23); Tampines, Singapore
- Cause of death: Murdered
- Education: Tun Seri Lanang Secondary School (GCE O-levels)
- Occupation: Police officer
- Employer: Singapore Police Force
- Known for: Murder victim
- Title: Corporal
- Children: None

On 15 February 1989, Mirza Abdul Halim bin Mirza Abdul Majid, a 23-year-old Singaporean and police constable (PC), was shot in the head by a suspected burglar who stabbed him in the neck and snatched his service revolver before using it to shoot PC Abdul Halim. PC Abdul Halim, who was later promoted to Corporal during his hospitalization, went into a coma and died 33 hours later. The killer Ong Yeow Tian (Chinese: 王耀添; pinyin: Wáng Yàotiān; Pe̍h-ōe-jī: Ô͘ng Iāu-thiam; c. 1960 – 25 November 1994), who was an ex-convict and one of the two suspects involved in a prior housebreaking case, was subsequently engaged in a shoot-out with several other policemen but was finally arrested. Ong's accomplice was also caught and later sentenced to incarceration and caning for the burglary.

Ong, meanwhile, was charged with murdering Corporal Abdul Halim under the Penal Code and also faced charges of illegally discharging a firearm with intent to cause hurt under the Arms Offences Act, and the said charges under either which legislation warrant the death penalty if found guilty. Ong was eventually sentenced to ten years' imprisonment for a reduced charge of voluntarily causing grievous hurt to Corporal Abdul Halim, but he returned to court for a second trial and sentenced to death for shooting at two other police officers (who both survived), and he was sent to the gallows on 25 November 1994.

The murder of Corporal Abdul Halim remained as one of the last few cases where officers of the Singapore Police Force were murdered while in line of duty. The last case took place on 30 November 1994 (five days after Ong's execution), when Senior Staff Sergeant Boo Tiang Huat (posthumously promoted to Station Inspector) was struck to death with an axe by 29-year-old Zainal Abidin Abdul Malik, who was convicted and later hanged for murder on 30 August 1996.

== Background ==
Mirza Abdul Halim, the youngest of ten children, was born in 1966. His father was former politician Mirza Abdul Majid, who first co-founded the now-defunct Labour Party with Malaysian politician Lim Yew Hock, before it was merged with another party as the Labour Front (1954 – 1960). Abdul Halim's father died in 1973 when Abdul Halim was only seven, while his mother died in October 1981 during a pilgrimage trip to Mecca. Abdul Halim was also the brother-in-law of Sidek Saniff, who was then senior Parliamentary secretary (Education) and married to one of Abdul Halim's sisters.

After completing his six-year primary school education, Abdul Halim went on to further his studies at Malay-medium school Tun Seri Lanang Secondary School (now defunct since 1988), where he completed his GCE O-levels in November 1984. He was known to be a student who was dedicated to his work and conscientious while in both his studies and co-curricular activities as a member of the National Cadet Corps.

In May 1985, 18-year-old Abdul Halim first joined the Singapore Police Force after his graduation from secondary school. According to his brother, Abdul Halim's "sudden" decision to join the police force would be something which his late mother would have objected to if she was alive. Prior to his death in February 1989, Abdul Halim planned to get married with his childhood sweetheart sometime in 1990 after Hari Raya Puasa.

== Death of Corporal Abdul Halim ==
=== Pursuit and shooting ===
On the early morning of 15 February 1989, five weeks after his release from prison, 29-year-old Singaporean hairstylist Ong Yeow Tian, who was previously convicted for housebreaking and drug-related offences, partnered with his 26-year-old unemployed friend and secret society member Chua Gin Boon (Chinese: 蔡锦文; pinyin: Cài Jǐnwén; Pe̍h-ōe-jī: Chhòa Kím-bûn) to commit housebreaking at Tampines. Both men, who brought along chisels and a knife, attempted to break into two shops, including a hair salon, with Ong trying to enter the shops while Chua acted as a lookout.

However, both men failed to do so, and they were caught red-handed by two police constables (PC) Chua Yew Hua (Chinese: 蔡耀华; pinyin: Cài Yàohuá; Pe̍h-ōe-jī: Chhòa Iāu-hôa) and Mirza Abdul Halim bin Mirza Abdul Majid, who responded to a police report lodged at 1.47am about the sighting of the robbers behaving suspiciously. Both the policemen gave chase, with PC Chua managing to arrest one of the suspects Chua, while PC Abdul Halim alone gave chase after Ong, and both got into a scuffle. During the struggle, Ong used the knife to stab PC Abdul Halim on the neck before he snatched PC Abdul Halim's Smith & Wesson revolver (which the policeman attempted to use for self-defence), which he used to shoot at PC Abdul Halim in the head. After critically injuring PC Abdul Halim, Ong then fled the scene with the revolver he stole from the fallen cop. Afterwards, a police manhunt was conducted to search for Ong.

=== Shoot-out between Ong and the police ===
Later, between 2am and 3am, upon the tip-off of a witness named Lachumana Govindasamy, a 40-year-old taxi driver who witnessed Ong entering another taxi (driven by a Mohamed Syed), the police arrived at Tampines Street 22, where Ong just alighted the taxi. When confronted by Sergeant Omar bin Amin and his partner PC Goh Soon Wan (alias Benny Goh; Chinese: 吴顺源; pinyin: Wú Shùnyuán; Pe̍h-ōe-jī: Gô͘ Sūn-goân), Ong fired at one of the officers, PC Goh, who remained unharmed and fired back another shot. Ong, who sustained a gunshot wound on the abdomen, escaped and he hid in the bushes within the area itself, before he was spotted by PC Ang Chai Hai (also spelt as Ang Chye Hai; Chinese: 洪财海; pinyin: Hóng Cáihǎi; Pe̍h-ōe-jī: Âng Châi-hái). Ong fired at PC Ang in the chest, but since PC Ang was wearing a bulletproof vest, he survived the gunshot but became unconscious as a result of the force impact inflicted by the bullet. After a subsequent exchange of gunfire between Ong and the other officers, Ong finally surrendered after being wounded seven times on the abdomen and arms, and he was arrested. Lachumana was later commended by the police for helping them to capture Ong, and both PC Goh and PC Ang were promoted to Corporal for their bravery and contribution to the successful arrest of Ong.

=== Field promotion and death ===
Meanwhile, PC Abdul Halim was rushed to Tan Tock Seng Hospital, where he was operated on but was still in critical condition and entered a comatose state. For his actions of trying to arrest Ong, PC Abdul Halim was given the rare field promotion to the rank of Corporal by Police Commissioner Goh Yong Hong while he was still in a coma. But after this promotion, Corporal Abdul Halim died at the age of 23 the next day on 16 February 1989, 33 hours after he was stabbed and shot. He was survived by five sisters and four brothers.

According to Dr Ong Peck Leong, the neurosurgeon who performed a surgery on Corporal Abdul Halim, he stated that the bullet had caused damage to both the skull and brain as it entered and got stuck between the scalp and skull, and was situated close to a vital blood vessel which supplied arterial blood to the brain, and the stab wound to the neck also caused his lungs to be flooding with blood, and a respiratory tube had to be inserted into the windpipe to allow Corporal Abdul Halim to breathe. These above factors were crucial to eventually lead to Corporal Abdul Halim's death despite the doctors' utmost efforts to treat him.

Many Singaporeans offered condolences and donations to Abdul Halim's family and remembered him as a hero for his dedication to maintain public safety as a police officer. Over 400 people attended his funeral (held by police) at Pusara Aman Mosque and he was buried with full police honours.

== Criminal charges of Ong and Chua ==
Ong Yeow Tian, who faced the death penalty for killing Corporal Abdul Halim and shooting at two other officers

Corporal Abdul Halim's killer Ong Yeow Tian, who was also hospitalized at Tan Tock Seng Hospital for his multiple gunshot wounds, was charged with murder on 17 February 1989. Under the Penal Code, the death penalty was mandatory for murder upon conviction. Ong eventually recovered from his injuries.

On 1 June 1989, Ong was brought back in court to face five fresh charges, consisting of two counts of attempted housebreaking under the Penal Code, and three more under the Arms Offences Act - one count of unlawful possession of a revolver and two counts of illegally discharging a firearm with intent to cause harm. Under the Arms Offences Act, the final two charges which Ong faced for firing the revolver at both Corporal Goh and PC Ang would also warrant the death penalty if convicted. His case was transferred to the High Court on 15 November 1989 after several pre-trial conferences.

As for Chua Gin Boon, Ong's friend and accomplice in the attempted burglary, he was charged with a total of four counts of housebreaking and consorting with a man carrying a weapon, for both the present case and another unrelated case of breaking-and-entering committed with an unnamed accomplice back on 29 October 1988. On 3 March 1989, after a trial at the district court, 26-year-old Chua was sentenced to a term of imprisonment for two years and three months, plus six strokes of the cane (caning was mandatory for a charge of consorting with an armed person).

== Trial of Ong Yeow Tian ==
=== First trial and conviction ===
On 3 August 1992, the prosecution amended the original charge of murder against 32-year-old Ong Yeow Tian, reducing the charge to one of voluntarily causing grievous hurt with dangerous weapons to Corporal Abdul Halim, in relation to using a knife to stab the police officer on the neck. Ong pleaded guilty to the charge in his first trial, and was accordingly convicted by Justice S. Rajendran of the High Court. Under Section 326 of the Penal Code, the maximum sentence for the lower charge was life imprisonment, in addition to possible caning.

However, sentencing was postponed pending Ong's second trial for the two charges of discharging a revolver at Sergeant Goh Soon Wan (promoted from Corporal before Ong's trial) and Corporal Ang Chai Hai. Ong's lawyer N. Ganesan sought the adjournment from Justice Rajendran due to the defence counsel's need to prepare the relevant documents and arguments for the upcoming trial, which would be complicated if Ong was held as a convict at Changi Prison. The judge approved the application and allowed the sentencing to be reserved until the end of Ong's second trial.

=== Second trial and sentence ===
On 20 October 1992, for the two charges of firing a revolver at the police, Ong stood trial at the High Court before veteran judge T. S. Sinnathuray, who formerly heard the case of notorious child murderer Adrian Lim. Sergeant Goh and Corporal Ang both appeared as witnesses for the prosecution, who also admitted the witness statements made by the taxi driver Lachumana Govindasamy, who died of natural causes sometime before Ong's trial. While the prosecution argued that Ong fired two shots at the cops with the intention to cause injury or death, Ong, who was called to make his defence, argued that he only fired the shots because he wanted to buy more time for himself to escape the pursuit by the police, and these shots were not meant to be aimed at the two officers to cause any harm to them.

On 22 October 1992, the same day when both sides made their final submissions, Justice Sinnathuray accepted the prosecution's case based on the evidence presented and therefore found Ong guilty of the two counts of unlawfully discharging the stolen revolver at Sergeant Goh and Corporal Ang under the intent of causing injury. Automatically, 32-year-old Ong Yeow Tian received two death sentences for both capital firearm charges.

=== Sentence for first trial ===
On 10 November 1992, barely a month after Ong was sentenced to death, the sentencing phase for Ong's first trial for killing Corporal Abdul Halim took place. Justice S. Rajendran sentenced Ong to ten years' imprisonment for the charge of using a knife to cause serious hurt to Corporal Abdul Halim. However, under the relevant laws, Ong's ten-year sentence would not take effect while he was on death row, and it could only be served should Ong be successful in overturning his two death sentences by appeal. Although caning is mandatory for the charge of intentionally causing serious harm, Justice Rajendran did not impose caning on Ong since it was decreed by law that offenders who received the death sentence should not be caned.

== Execution ==
On 25 April 1994, Ong Yeow Tian, who was held on death row, lost his appeal against his sentence for firing shots at Sergeant Goh Soon Wan and Corporal Ang Chai Hai.

On the morning of 25 November 1994, 34-year-old Ong Yeow Tian was put to death by hanging at Changi Prison. On the same day of Ong's execution, 32-year-old Singaporean drug trafficker Lee Lum Sheun was also hanged at the same timing for a single charge of trafficking 57.84g of heroin. A third scheduled execution of Hong Kong-born drug trafficker Daniel Chan Chi-pun on that morning itself was postponed at the last minute due to a pending appeal for clemency, before Chan was finally executed on 10 March 1995 for smuggling of 464g of heroin. Prior to Ong's execution, he converted to Christianity and was baptized by Chan, who was Ong's fellow inmate while on death row.

Corporal Abdul Halim was one of the last police officers to be killed in the form of homicide while in the line of duty. In the aftermath of his murder and other gun-snatching incidents, snatch-resistant holsters were introduced for officers of the Singapore Police Force in later years. Singaporean crime show Crimewatch also re-enacted the case (together with the police appeal of the Lim Shiow Rong murder case) as the seventh episode of the show's annual season in 1995.

== See also ==
- Lim Ban Lim
- Hoi Kim Heng
- Murder of Boo Tiang Huat
- Murder of Lee Kim Lai
- Arms Offences Act
- Capital punishment in Singapore
- List of Singapore police officers killed in the line of duty
- List of major crimes in Singapore
