= Murder of Ching Bee Ing =

1995 killing of a prostitute in Singapore

Ching Bee Ing
- Ching Bee Ing, the 26-year-old murder victim
- Born: Ching Bee Ing; 1969; Sarawak, Malaysia
- Died: 8 August 1995 (aged 26); Teck Lim Road, Singapore
- Cause of death: Murdered
- Other name: To-to
- Occupation: Prostitute (former)
- Employer: A brothel at Teck Lim Road
- Known for: Murder victim
- Spouse: Unnamed husband
- Children: 2

On 8 August 1995, a 26-year-old prostitute named Ching Bee Ing (Chinese: 曾美婷; pinyin: Zēng Meǐtíng; Pe̍h-ōe-jī: Chêng Bí-têng) was stabbed seven times by her 35-year-old co-worker Teo Kim Hong (张金凤; Zhāng Jīnféng; Tiuⁿ Kim-hōng) at a brothel along Teck Lim Road. Ching, a Malaysian, died as a result of four fatal knife wounds to her liver and heart. Teo, a Singaporean, was charged with murder after she was arrested for the brutal stabbing. Teo was found guilty and sentenced to death in January 1996, and after the loss of her appeal, Teo was hanged on 30 August 1996.

== Murder ==
On 8 August 1995, at a brothel along Teck Lim Road, a prostitute was stabbed seven times by one of her co-workers, who was restrained by a 70-year-old male customer before the police were contacted and arrived to apprehend the attacker. A diving knife was also seized from the assailant.

The 26-year-old Malaysian-born victim of the stabbing incident, identified as Ching Bee Ing (alias To-to), was mortally wounded and died by the time an ambulance arrived. She was a popular prostitute who often received customers requesting her services due to her personality and beauty, and she was a well-mannered colleague to her co-workers.

According to Dr Wee Keng Poh, a senior forensic pathologist, he examined the body and stated that out of the seven knife wounds on Ching's corpse, four were fatal and they penetrated the liver and heart; he pointed out that based on the severity of the injuries, any one of these stab wounds alone was sufficient to cause death in the ordinary course of nature.

Ching, who was born and raised in the Malaysian state of Sarawak, was married with a pair of twin daughters and had one older brother and a few more siblings in her family. Ching reportedly lied to her family that she was working as a waitress in a restaurant in Singapore and hid the fact that she was a prostitute, a truth which brought sadness and shock to her kin upon her death. Her husband travelled from Kuala Lumpur to Singapore to reclaim her body.

Meanwhile, Ching's alleged killer, a 35-year-old Singaporean named Teo Kim Hong, was officially arrested and charged with murder. Background information revealed that Teo and Ching were friends but they fell out shortly before the murder. Teo herself left school at age eleven and she gave birth to one son at age sixteen; the son (aged 20 in 1996) was serving his National Service when his mother was charged with killing Ching. It was revealed that Teo herself was a distant cousin of Lim Ban Lim, who was one of Singapore's most notorious gunmen and the perpetrator of the murder of police corporal Koh Chong Thye in 1968. Lim was later killed by police during a gunfight in 1972.

== Trial and sentencing ==
Teo Kim Hong, who faced the death penalty for murdering her colleague Ching Bee Ing

On 17 January 1996, Teo Kim Hong's trial for one count of murdering Ching Bee Ing began, and her case was heard at the High Court. Teo was represented by both Winston Mok and Tan Teow Yeow while both David Khoo and Beverly Wee were appointed as the trial prosecutors. The murder trial was presided over by Judicial Commissioner Choo Han Teck.

The court was told that the defendant Teo and Ching Bee Ing often came together to provide their services to the customers. However, during the prior week before Ching's death, Teo and Ching fell out after they clashed over serving a client. Several witnesses, mainly those who frequented the brothel or worked at the brothel, testified that six days before her death, Ching was assaulted by Teo after she finished servicing a male customer, and Ching never fought back during the assault, choosing to apologise to Teo.

Teo testified in court that she fell out with Ching because of Ching allegedly insulting her boyfriend, and she also believed that Ching was responsible for infecting her boyfriend with a sexually transmitted infection. She even claimed that she received a phone call from Ching's boyfriend who threatened her for what she did to Ching, and Teo also blamed Ching for an argument she had with her boyfriend, after Teo's boyfriend discovered that Teo was providing oral sex to her clients at the brothel. Out of anger over their personal issues, Teo decided to confront Ching, starting with going to a shopping mall to purchase a diving knife from the Mall's diving equipment store. Teo claimed her intention of bringing the knife was merely for self-defense instead of causing any hurt to Ching. However, the prosecution argued that based on the evidence before the court, it was evident that Ching never provoked Teo or even acted negatively towards the defendant, and it was clear that Teo herself had the premeditated intent to commit murder and voluntarily inflicted seven knife wounds on the defenceless victim while she was resting in her room, with a view to cause severe bodily harm that was sufficient to lead to Ching's death. Therefore, they submitted that Teo should be convicted of murder in their final submissions before sentencing.

On 24 January 1996, after a five-day trial, Judicial Commissioner Choo delivered his judgement. He rejected Teo's claims that she was under grave and sudden provocation at the time of the murder, and also did not accept her other claims of having no intent to cause bodily harm to Ching, effectively rejecting the allegations Teo made against Ching for supposedly insulting her boyfriend. Judicial Commissioner Choo stated that it was clear that Ching was unarmed and defenceless and that she was resting alone when Teo barged in to slap her and confront her, which made her more of an aggressor in this case. Teo's decision of bringing a knife with her was also a telling sign that she intended to harm Ching, and it demonstrated her premeditation to cause injury to Ching as well. Since Teo had intentionally stabbed Ching seven times, such that four of the knife wounds were sufficient in the ordinary course of nature to cause death, and Teo herself had the premeditation to commit the offence of murder, Teo was considered guilty under the law.

As such, Judicial Commissioner Choo found 36-year-old Teo Kim Hong guilty of murder, and sentenced her to death. Under the laws of Singapore, the death penalty was mandated as the sole punishment for murder upon conviction, and there was no discretion to sentence such offenders to any other punishment aside from death. According to news reports, Teo was expressionless at the time of sentencing, and her elderly mother was very hysterical at the verdict of death, so much so that she collapsed in court after Teo was led away. Teo's older brother Teo Cheow Kim even openly shouted an expletive at the trial judge for sentencing his younger sister to death.

As a result of the murder, according to the brothel owner, his business fell sharply due to the public attention focused on the murder that took place there.

== Fate of Teo Kim Hong ==
After she was sentenced to death, Teo filed an appeal against her conviction and sentence, but on 26 March 1996, the Court of Appeal unanimously rejected Teo's appeal, dismissing her claims of a sudden fight and lack of premeditation in committing the murder, and they did not call for the prosecution to reply prior to turning down her appeal.

On 30 August 1996, 36-year-old Teo Kim Hong was hanged in Changi Prison at dawn. On the same date of Teo's execution, three more convicts on death row were put to death at the same prison; one of them was Zainal Abidin Abdul Malik, who brutally murdered a police officer Boo Tiang Huat in November 1994, before receiving a death sentence for the crime in July 1995.

== Aftermath ==
Eleven years after Teo was executed, in May 2007, her older brother Teo Cheow Kim was found guilty of trafficking 30.37g of diamorphine and sentenced to death; the trial judge of her brother's case was Choo Han Teck, who was coincidentally the same judge that sent Teo to the gallows for murdering Ching Bee Ing. One of Teo's cousins Lim Ah Tee (younger brother of notorious gunman Lim Ban Lim) was also charged in the same drug case as Teo's brother before he received a discharge not amounting to an acquittal. Teo's brother was since executed after losing his appeal in November 2007.

As a result of her brother's conviction for drug trafficking, Teo Kim Hong's case was recalled and it was regarded as one of the high-profile cases of women receiving the death penalty in Singapore during the last decade.

In March 2026, 30 years after the execution of Teo, Justice Choo Han Teck, the former judge of Teo's case who retired a month before, accepted an interview and spoke about his career as a judge. Justice Choo revealed that when he sentenced Teo's brother Cheow Kim to death, he remembered hearing Cheow Kim angrily swearing at him and condemning him for sentencing Teo Kim Hong to death back in 1996. He also recalled that Cheow Kim's three sons (Teo's nephews) were allegedly gang members and he was informed by his court security team that based on information gathered through prison intelligence, Teo's nephews wanted to harm him and the prosecutor in charge of their father's case, and for the following two months, Justice Choo was accompanied by an armed security detail of two to three men who were assigned to guard him round the clock.

== See also ==
- Capital punishment in Singapore
