= Killing of Hoi Kim Heng =

1994 case of a Singaporean police officer stabbed to death during a police chase

Coordinates: 1°17′04.97″N 103°50′46.80″E

Hoi Kim Heng
- Born: Hoi Kim Heng; 1970; Singapore
- Died: 21 May 1994 (aged 24); South Bridge Road, Singapore
- Cause of death: Murdered
- Occupation: Police officer
- Employer: Singapore Police Force
- Known for: Murder victim; awarded Pingat Keberanian Polis posthumously

On 21 May 1994, Corporal Hoi Kim Heng (Chinese: 许健庆; pinyin: Xǔ Jiànqìng; Jyutping: Heoi2 Gin6 Hing3), a police officer of the Singapore Police Force, was stabbed to death by habitual offender Soh Loo Ban (Chinese: 苏罗万; pinyin: Sū Luówàn; Pe̍h-ōe-jī: So͘ Lô͘-bān), after a chase near Fook Hai Building in Chinatown, Singapore.

== Police chase and murder ==
On 21 May 1994, Hoi, a regular police officer with the Central Police Division, was on regular patrol with his partner, 31-year-old Corporal Tan Huang Yee (Chinese: 陈广义; pinyin: Chén Guǎngyì; Pe̍h-ōe-jī: Tân Kóng-gī), in their Fast Response Car in the Chinatown area, when they spotted 50-year-old Soh Loo Ban on Nankin Street, behaving suspiciously. They stopped and stepped out to check on Soh, who was known to them for his history of crimes such as theft, armed robbery, drug offences and secret society activities. Soh's most recent offence had been barely a month prior, when he was arrested for possession and consumption of drugs on 23 April, for which he had been released on bail but later absconded.

When Tan asked Soh for his identity card, he pretended to reach for his card but instead produced a 10-centimetre-long (3.9-inch) knife, which he used to stab Tan in his left arm before turning to flee. Both officers chased after Soh down Nankin Street. When reaching the Fook Hai Building, Soh stopped, turned and ran into the pursuing officers, colliding with Hoi and sending both men to the ground. As they collided, Soh stabbed Hoi in the left side of his neck with the knife, before continuing his escape with Tan still in pursuit. Hoi got to his feet and briefly continued to chase Soh, but collapsed soon after.

Soh was chased to the Hong Lim Food Centre where the slipperiness of the floor caused both Tan and Soh to fall. Tan sustained more stab wounds from Soh in his left leg and arm, and fired two shots at Soh with his revolver. One bullet hit Soh on the left side of his chest, killing him; the other struck a passerby, a 37-year-old labourer (Chinese: 苏金盾; pinyin: Sū Jīndùn), who was on the second level of the three-storey food centre, injuring his shin.

Other officers arriving at the scene found Hoi barely alive. He was rushed to the hospital where he was pronounced dead an hour later. Both Tan and the passerby recovered from their injuries.

== Aftermath ==
Hoi, who joined the police force in December 1989, was given a field promotion posthumously on 23 May 1994. He was also given a police ceremonial cremation with full police honours, and awarded the Pingat Polis Keberanian. Tan, who joined the police force in April 1983, was promoted to the rank of Sergeant.

The case made front-page news in the local media, and led to the public writing letters to the press expressing concerns over the possibility of police procedures preventing an officer from defending himself adequately. Existing police procedures forbade officers from drawing their weapons except when there were imminent signs of danger to themselves or others. Hoi's death contributed to a review of these procedures, which now permit officers to draw their weapons based on personal judgement and assessment of the situation.

Hoi was the penultimate police officer in Singapore to be killed in the line of duty to date, the last being Station Inspector Boo Tiang Huat on 30 November 1994.

== See also ==
- List of Singapore police officers killed in the line of duty
- List of major crimes in Singapore
- Murder of Mirza Abdul Halim
- Murder of Boo Tiang Huat
