= FRV =

FRV may refer to:

- Fast Response Vehicle
- Fire Rescue Victoria
- Fisheries research vessel
- FR-V (microprocessor)
- Honda FR-V
