= Cadet leader =

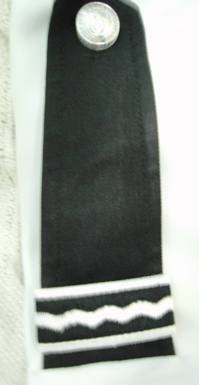
Rank insignia of a cadet leader in Singapore

Cadet leader is a rank held by senior cadets in the St. John Brigade Singapore, and is a position that National Police Cadet Corps cadets hold after becoming Non-Commissioned Officers (NCOs).

== Details ==
=== St. John Brigade Singapore ===
Cadets holding this rank are normally between their 15th and 18th birthdays. They rank above cadet NCOs but are subordinate to adult members and officers. In the St. John Ambulance Brigade of Ireland the rank of cadet leader belongs to an adult member who assists in the training of cadets and holds a rank higher than an adult NCO but lower than an officer.

The badge of rank for cadet leader varies from nation to nation, but in most countries it is two horizontal white stripes with a white wavy band in between, worn on both epaulette straps. In England this was changed to three horizontal stripes before the rank was abolished in 2005. It was replaced by the rank of leading cadet which is indicated by a solid bar embroidered in silver thread.

The rank of cadet leader in the St. John Ambulance Brigade in Singapore was abolished in 2010 and replaced by the rank of senior staff sergeant.

Source: St John Ambulance Brigade Regulations (Overseas Edition)

=== National Police Cadet Corps ===
In the National Police Cadet Corps, after a cadet has gone through the unit's Cadet Leader Camp, which involves lectures and practical sessions, he/she will be appointed as a Cadet Leader in his/her unit, which means that he/she would have become a NCO. Cadets take on appointments in their Unit (e.g.: Unit OIC, etc.) after being appointed as a CL.
