= 2012 Singapore bus drivers' strike =

Wildcat strike against SMRT Corporation

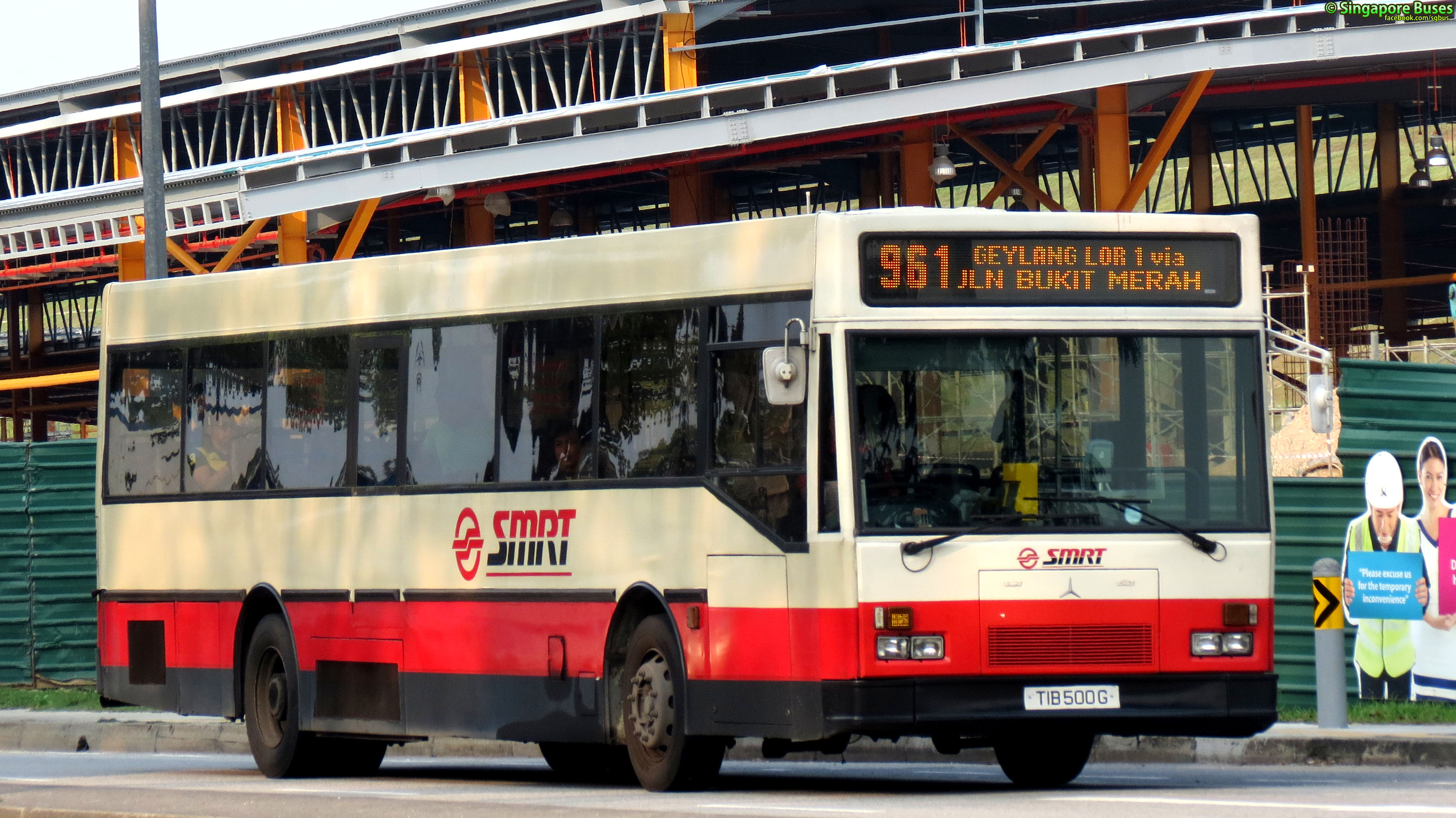
Drivers from SMRT Buses went on a strike for two days

In November 2012, bus drivers in Singapore initiated a wildcat strike, which lasted for two days and involved more than a hundred Chinese drivers at the public transport operator SMRT Buses. Some of the strikers were later deported or imprisoned.

== Background ==
Under the Criminal Law (Temporary Provisions) Act, strike actions involving key workers such as bus drivers are illegal in Singapore, unless their employers are notified two weeks in advance; illegal striking in Singapore carries a maximum penalty of a year's imprisonment and a fine of S$2,000. Prior to November 2012, the last industrial action in Singapore had been a legal strike in 1986 that involved workers at the U.S.-based oil equipment manufacturer Hydril.

Bus services in Singapore are managed by several public transport operators, including SBS Transit and SMRT Buses. At the time of the strike, SMRT managed a quarter of Singapore's bus services and employed approximately 2,000 bus drivers, about 450 of whom were from China while another 450 were from Malaysia.

In 2010, up to 185 of SMRT's Chinese drivers signed a petition that accused their employer of mistreating and underpaying them. In July 2012, SMRT increased the monthly salaries of all its bus drivers. Chinese drivers, who had previously been paid S$1,000 a month, received a monthly pay raise of S$75. On the other hand, Malaysian drivers, who had previously been paid S$1,200 a month, received a monthly pay raise of S$150. This development reportedly exacerbated the Chinese drivers' frustration with SMRT.

== Strike ==
Around 03:00 on 26 November 2012, bus drivers living at SMRT's dormitories in Woodlands and Serangoon refused to begin their morning shifts. They were subsequently joined by a few of their colleagues who worked in the afternoon. A total of 171 SMRT bus drivers, all of whom were from China, failed to turn up for work on 26 November. Riot police arrived at the Woodlands dormitory at 10:00. Around 16:00, SMRT representatives met with the protesters at the dormitory and promised them a monthly pay raise of S$25, but this was not sufficient to end the strike action.

On 27 November, between 88 and 112 Chinese SMRT drivers took part in the strike, some of whom had shown up for work the day before. Representatives from SMRT, the National Transport Workers' Union, as well as the Chinese Embassy in Singapore quickly convened at the Woodlands dormitory, but they failed to convince the bus drivers to end the strike. SMRT filed a police report around 18:45, following which Acting Minister for Manpower Tan Chuan-Jin described the strike as "illegal" and "not acceptable".

Some of the drivers who participated in the strike were reportedly unaware that it was illegal. Faced with the threat of imprisonment and deportation, almost all of the strikers returned to work on 28 November. The same morning, the Singapore Police Force arrested some twenty Chinese drivers at SMRT.

== Aftermath ==
Shortly after the incident, the Immigration and Checkpoints Authority deported some 29 strikers to China. The remaining strikers were warned but allowed to continue working in Singapore. Investigators subsequently determined that the strike had been masterminded by SMRT employees Gao Yue Qiang, He Jun Ling, Liu Xiangying, and Wang Xianjie. In February 2013, they were each sentenced to six weeks' imprisonment for "conspiring to launch a strike"; He was sentenced to an additional weeks' imprisonment for inciting his colleagues to join the strike on Baidu and Tencent QQ.

National Trades Union Congress secretary-general Lim Swee Say surmised that the strike happened because the workers and their employers "did not work closely enough". He Jun Ling also urged more SMRT bus drivers to become union members; at the time of the strike, only one out of ten SMRT bus drivers had joined the National Transport Workers' Union.

== See also ==
- Singapore Glass Factory strikes
