= Sub-inspector =

Police rank

Sub-inspector (SI), or sub-inspector of police (SIP) or police sub-inspector (PSI), is a rank used extensively in South Asia: in the police forces of Bangladesh, Pakistan, India, and Sri Lanka, which are primarily based on the British model. It was formerly used in most British colonial police forces and in certain British police forces as well. The rank usually was in charge of a police substation or assisted an inspector.

== United Kingdom ==
The rank of sub-inspector was introduced into the Metropolitan Police in the late 19th century. It did not last long, being effectively replaced by station sergeant in 1890. Officers who already held the rank retained it, and were promoted to inspector as soon as a vacancy arose.

In the Metropolitan Police, a rank wearing one star was formerly officially known as a "station inspector" to distinguish it from the more senior rank of sub-divisional inspector that was abolished in 1949.

== Canada ==
The Royal Canadian Mounted Police rank of sub-inspector was introduced in 1942 with the insignia of one star, similar to an army second lieutenant. This was changed in 1960 to three stars, similar to an army captain. It was disestablished in the reorganization of 1990, which eliminated the RCMP's subaltern ranks.

== Hong Kong ==
The rank of sub-inspector was eliminated in 1970.

== British South Africa Police ==
The rank of sub inspector was replaced after the Rhodesian Unilateral Declaration of Independence with three grades of; patrol officer, senior patrol officer and section officer with one, two, and three gold coloured bars respectively.

== India ==
Sub-inspector of police
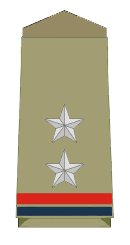
- Sub-Inspector insignia: two stars with red-blue striped ribbon
- Service branch: Civil Police (General Executive); Armed Reserve Police; Technical
- Abbreviation: SI, PSI
- Rank group: Non-Gazetted Officer (NGO) / Subordinate Police Service
- Next higher rank: Inspector of Police
- Next lower rank: Assistant sub-inspector of police
- Equivalent ranks: Sergeant

A sub-inspector (SI) is generally in command of few police personnel but this is the junior in-charge of a Police Station (with head constables, the equivalent of corporals, commanding police outposts). It is the lowest rank of officer who, under Indian Police rules and regulations, can file a charge sheet in court, and is usually the first investigating officer. Officers subordinate to them cannot file charge sheets, but can only investigate cases on their behalf.

Sub-Inspectors function as principal sub-inspectors, serving as officers in charge of law and order, or as crime sub-inspectors responsible for crime investigation at the police station level. They may also be posted to specialised units, such as traffic, special branches, or other operational wings. They can serve as station house officers in rural areas in some states.

A sub-inspector ranks above an assistant sub-inspector of police (ASI) and below an inspector of police. Most sub-inspectors are directly recruited into the police and have better educational qualifications than lower-ranking police officers.

In Kerala Police, the designation of grade sub-inspector (Grade SI) is awarded to officers from the lower ranks after 25 years of service. Although they wear the same rank insignia as regular sub-inspectors, they lack powers of regular sub-inspectors such as independent investigative authority, and cannot submit charge sheets. They continue to hold their substantive lower rank for official and legal purposes. A similar system exists in the Tamil Nadu Police, where eligible personnel from the constabulary are designated as Special Sub-Inspectors (SSI).

Specialised forces such as the Central Armed Police Forces (CAPFs), State Armed Police Forces and Armed Police Battalions use the same rank, but generally these officers do not have any investigative powers. There are also specialist non-investigative officers in the police forces, such as sub-inspector (band), sub-inspector (motor transport) and sub-inspector (telecommunication).

The rank insignia for a sub-inspector is two (five point) stars, and a red and blue striped ribbon at the outer end of the shoulder straps. This is similar to the insignia of a subedar in the Indian Army. An assistant sub-inspector has one (five point) star, and a red and blue striped ribbon at the outer end of the shoulder straps. This is similar to the insignia of a naib subedar in the Indian Army. The rank insignia for principal sub-inspector and additional sub-inspector are the same.

For the post of sub-inspector and assistant sub inspector, a Staff Selection Commission (SSC) recruits eligible candidates on national level in various Central Armed Police Forces like BSF, CRPF, ITBP, SSB, CISF, and other Central Police Organisations, such as CBI, RPF. Sub Inspector of Central Armed Police Forces and State police Forces have same scale and pay level.

In 2024 Manvi Madhu Kashyap became India's first openly transgender police sub-inspector.

== Malaysia ==
Shoulder board of a Royal Malaysia Police officer with rank of police sub-inspector

In the Royal Malaysia Police (PDRM), the rank of sub-inspector is the senior-most of non-commissioned officers. They are also the lowest ranking police officers to wear their rank insignia on epaulettes on both shoulders. A sub-inspector of the PDRM ranks immediately above a sergeant major (SM) and below a probationary inspector (P/Insp).

== Nepal ==
In the Nepal Police, the rank of sub inspector is generally the next senior rank from assistant sub inspector (ASI) and is less senior than an inspector. Members holding the rank usually wear an epaulette featuring two silver stars, the same rank badge as a sub inspector in the Armed Police Force.

== Sri Lanka ==
In the Sri Lanka Police Service, sub-inspector of police (SI) ranks above that of police sergeant major (PSM) and below an inspector (IP). Generally an SI is the officer in charge (OIC) of a small police station, a detachment of police personal or deputy OIC of a larger police station in a metropolitan area.

Most sub-inspectors are directly recruited into the police service as probationary sub-inspectors for one year's training. The basic educational entry requirement is that an applicant has passed the G.C.E Advance Level Examination. Annually, a number of other officers come up through the ranks and are promoted to rank of SI. The rank insignia for a sub-inspector is one star.

== Romania ==
In the Romanian Police, subinspector is the lowest commissioned rank, below inspector, and corresponds to the former rank of police second lieutenant (see Romanian Police ranks).

== Other police forces ==
- Royal Hong Kong Police
- Palestine Police (before 1948)
- Mossos d'Esquadra
