= Teck Lim Road =

Road in Chinatown, Singapore

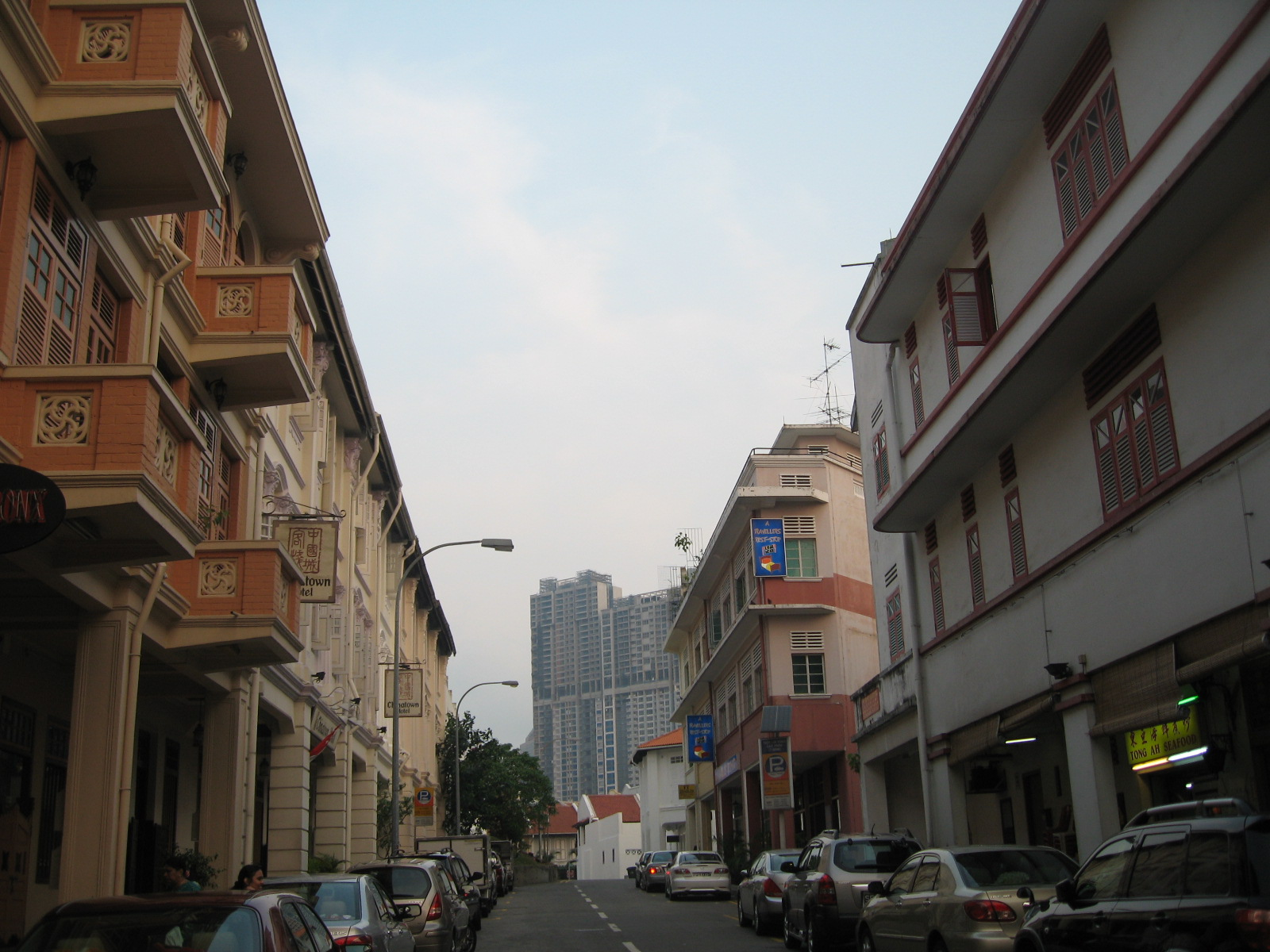
Teck Lim Road

Teck Lim Road (Chinese: 德霖路; pinyin: Dé lín lù) is a one-way road linking Keong Saik Road to Neil Road in Chinatown within the Outram Planning Area of Singapore. The road is lined with conserved shops and houses a number of budget hotels.

The road is named after Chinese businessman Ong Teck Lim (Chinese: 王德霖; pinyin: Wáng Dé Lín), the son of Ong Kew Ho (Chinese: 王九河; pinyin: Wáng Jiǔ Hé).
