= Singapore Glass Factory strikes =

Strikes by employees of the Singapore Glass Factory

Singapore Glass Factory strike
- Date: 28 August – 9 November 1960 (65 years ago)
- Location: Singapore

Parties
Singapore Glass Manufacturers Co Ltd	Glass Factory Workers' Union

Units involved
	600

The Singapore Glass Factory strikes refer to multiple strikes by employees of Singapore Glass Manufacturers Co Ltd. The most notable strike was on 28 August 1960 where 600 employees of Singapore Glass Manufacturers Co Ltd went on a strike that lasted 73 days due to disagreements between Singapore Glass Manufacturers and its employees.

== Background ==
Singapore Glass Manufacturers Co Ltd was established in July 1948 as an offshoot of Australian Consolidated Industries Ltd, with a factory at Henderson Road, Bukit Merah. Singapore Glass Manufacturers was also the only automatic glass plant in Singapore.

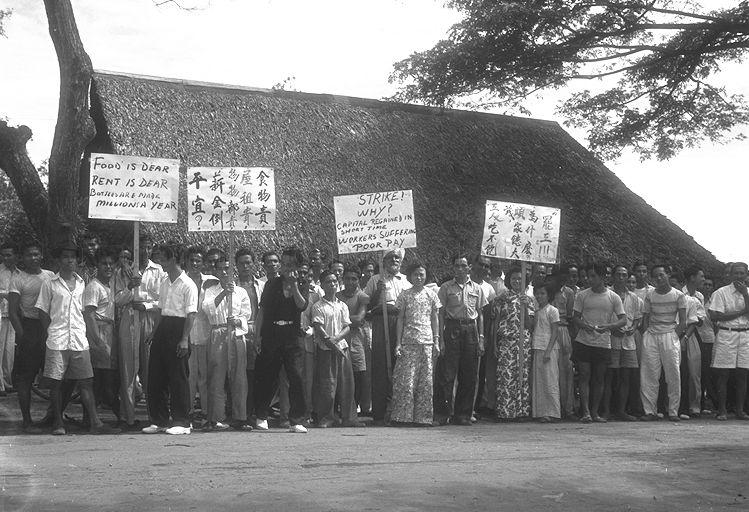
The 1951 strike, consisting of 700 employees and lasting 24 days.

In 1951, there was an earlier strike against Singapore Glass Manufacturers which consisted of 700 employees with the strike lasting 24 days. The main reason for the strike was for higher wages and for some glass fitters to be reinstated, who were dismissed a few days before the strike.

In June 1958, the workers went on another strike, lasting 1 day and consisting of 500 employees. In July 1958, 200 former employees of Singapore Glass Manufacturers went on a 5 month long strike that ended in November.

== Incident ==
In 1960, employees of Singapore Glass Manufacturers went on another strike on 28 August. On 22 October, at 2.30 p.m., a lorry carrying a hydraulic pressure pump and a sealing unit was leaving the factory before being stopped by strikers creating a human barrier, preventing the lorry from leaving. Police from Tanjong Pagar Police Station negotiated with the strikers for one hour before trying to push through them, resulting in a fight between the police and the strikers. Four policemen were injured while 39 strikers were arrested and brought to Tanjong Pagar Police Station.

On 29 October, at 8.00 a.m., four lorries attempted to enter the factory before being stopped by the strikers and being persuaded to not go to work. At 10.15 a.m., more police arrived as they told the strikers that they could persuade the workers but could not obstruct them. At 10.30 a.m., a Black Maria arrived with 20 policemen with wicker shields, causing the crowd to disperse by 2.00 p.m.

On 2 November, a fight broke out between 38 workers attempting to enter the factory, 42 strikers who wanted to go back to work, and the rest of the strikers. The 42 strikers had originally talked with Law Minister K. M. Byrne about their decision to return to work. 14 people were arrested. From 4 to 8 November, discussions with the strikers were held, eventually ending the 73 day-long strike on 9 November.

== See also ==
- 2012 Singapore bus drivers' strike
