= Tee Tua Ba =

Singaporean diplomat and police commissioner

Tee Tua Ba DUBC PJG PPA(E) PPA(P) (simplified Chinese: 郑大峇; traditional Chinese: 鄭大峇; pinyin: Zhèng Dàbā) is a former Commissioner of Police of the Singapore Police Force from 1992 to 1997 and the former Chairman of the Singapore Red Cross Society where he served for 12 years from 2008 till 2020. He was also Singapore's ambassador to other countries. He is currently the Chairman of the Portcullis Group.

== Early life and education ==
Tee was born in Singapore on 17 June 1942 and studied at Serangoon School, Victoria School and Raffles Institution. He entered the University of Singapore and graduated with an LLB Honours degree in 1966 and was subsequently admitted as an advocate and solicitor to the Supreme Court of Singapore in 1967. He attended the Senior Command Course, Bramshill Police College, United Kingdom in 1982 and the Advanced Management Programme, INSEAD, France in 1989.

== Career ==
=== Police career ===
Tee joined the Police Force as Assistant Superintendent of Police in July 1967. Since then, he has held various appointments within the Ministry of Home Affairs, which include Office-in-Charge, Marine Police 1974 to 1976, Commander of Police Divisions from November 1976 to March 1978, Director, Central Narcotics Bureau from April 1978 to March 1981 and Director of Criminal Investigation Department in 1981. He was appointed Deputy Commissioner of Police from 1982 to 1987. He held the post of Director, Prisons from 1 January 1988 until 1 July 1992. He assumed his appointment as Commissioner of Police on 1 July 1992. He retired as Commissioner of Police on 1 July 1997.

=== Diplomatic career ===
Tee began his diplomatic career after his retirement from the police force in 1997. He has since served as Singapore's ambassador to Brunei, Egypt, Jordan, the United Arab Emirates (UAE) and Cyprus, as well as non-resident ambassador to Switzerland and the UAE.

== Personal life ==
Tee is married to Adelene Kong and they have two sons.

== Honours ==
Throughout his career with the Ministry of Home Affairs, Tee received many awards, among them the Public Administration Medal (Silver) in 1974, the Public Administration Medal (Gold) in 1981 and the Meritorious Service Medal in 1998. He received the Singapore Anti-Narcotics Association, Gold Medal of Honour in 1986. Tee was awarded "Tan Sri" title by the Malaysian Government upon being conferred the Panglima Setia Makhota (PSM) in 1994 and the Royal Malaysia Police Order of Valour Medal in 1996. In 2015, he was conferred the Distinguished Service Order at the SG50 National Day Awards.

=== Foreign honour ===
- Malaysia : Honorary Commander of the Order of Loyalty to the Crown of Malaysia (P.S.M.) (1994)
