= Pingat Polis Keberanian =

Police Award in Singapore

- Medal and ribbon
- Type: Medal
- Awarded for: Displaying exceptional courage during situations of danger
- Presented by: Singapore Police Force
- Eligibility: Police officers of the Singapore Police Force
- Status: Active
- Established: 1987
- First award: D/Sgt Madhavan s/o Govinda Nair (1988)

The Pingat Polis Keberanian (English: Police Medal of Valour), also known as the Police Gallantry Medal, is awarded to officers of the Singapore Police Force (SPF) who display exceptional courage during situations of danger. Since its constitution, the medal has been awarded to nine recipients, with the first awarded in 1988 to D/Sgt Madhavan s/o Govinda Nair for his courageous attempts to stop a robbery at Fook Hai Building on 4 June 1988. Two medals were awarded posthumously in 1994 to Sgt Hoi Kim Heng and SI Boo Tiang Huat, after they were killed in the line of duty on separate incidents which occurred on 21 May 1994 and 30 November 1994 respectively.

No further medals were awarded until the year 2003 when six medals were awarded to a crew of Police Coast Guard officers led by DSP1 Tan Wee Wah Stephen who responded and conducted rescue efforts after a collision of the Republic of Singapore Navy's RSS Courageous and a merchant ship, ANL Indonesia which occurred on 3 January 2003.

== Award recipients ==
- 1988: D/Sgt Madhavan S/O Govinda Nair
- 1994: Sgt Hoi Kim Heng (posthumous)
- 1994: SI Boo Tiang Huat (posthumous)
- 2003: DSP1 Tan Wee Wah Stephen
- 2003: SSS Mohammad Ramli Bin Mohammad Shariff
- 2003: Sgt Lee Swee Keng Darren
- 2003: Sgt Mohammad Faizal Bin Ali
- 2003: Cpl (NS) Teo Seng Guan Don
- 2003: Cpl (NS) Sukiman Bin Isnin
