= Senior staff sergeant =

Rank in Singapore

Senior staff sergeant (abbreviation: SSS or SSSGT) is a non-commissioned rank in the Singapore Police Force and St. John Brigade Singapore.

== Organisations ==
=== St. John Brigade Singapore ===
The rank of senior staff sergeant (SSS) was implemented in 2010 and replaced the rank of cadet leader. It is the highest rank attainable by adult and cadet members, above the rank of staff sergeant. The rank insignia is similar to that of a staff sergeant, with an additional laurel encircling the St John coat of arms.

=== Singapore Police Force ===
The rank of Senior Staff Sergeant (SSSGT) is in the Junior Police Officer category, and is above the rank of Sergeant (3)/ Staff Sergeant and below the rank of Station Inspector (SI). The rank insignia of SSSGT is one Singapore coat of arms with a garland around it, and three pointed-down chevrons around it.
