= Murder of Lee Kim Lai =

1978 double murder in Singapore

Coordinates: 1°17′42.41″N 103°48′01.76″E

Lee Kim Lai
- Born: Lee Kim Lai; 1960; State of Singapore
- Died: 25 April 1978 (aged 17–18); Geylang Bahru, Singapore
- Cause of death: Murder
- Occupation: Police officer
- Employer: Singapore Police Force
- Known for: Victim of a double murder in 1978

On 25 April 1978, Lee Kim Lai (Chinese: 李金来; pinyin: Lǐ Jīnlái), a Singaporean police officer, was robbed and murdered by three men for his service revolver. A serving Police National Serviceman, he was performing sentry duty at the Police Reserve Unit 1 base of the Singapore Police Force at Mount Vernon when he was abducted from the front gate and forced into a taxi. His body was later found with multiple stab wounds in the abandoned taxi, whose driver, 60-year-old Chew Theng Hin, had also been killed earlier.

== Background ==
Ong Chin Hock (Chinese: 王进福; pinyin: Wáng Jìnfú), Yeo Ching Boon (Chinese: 杨青文; pinyin: Yáng Qīngwén), and Ong Hwee Kuan (Chinese: 王慧君; pinyin: Wáng Huìjūn), all aged 20, were childhood friends since their days in Tu Li Primary School (Chinese: 土里小学). Chin Hock left school in Primary Three and began working odd jobs as a hawker assistant and construction worker until his enlistment for National Service in the army. Yeo was expelled from Tu Li Secondary School when he was in Secondary Three after a fight and worked as a stock handler for three months before he was again sacked for fighting. He then worked as a fitter and wireman before being enlisted with the Singapore Police Force for his National Service, where he was posted to the Police Reserve Unit 1 base.

Hwee Kuan, a school drop-out at age 12 after repeatedly failing his Entrance Examination in 1972, had worked as a painter and an odd job labourer. He had been involved in petty crimes with other members of the "18 group" of Sio Kun Tong, a secret society. He was placed under police supervision for a year in February 1974 for involvement with the group and was jailed for two years in 1973 for consorting with another police supervisee and was subsequently under police supervision for another year upon his release. In 1976, Hwee Kuan robbed a Malay man for his watch and cash with Chin Hock and another friend. In April 1977, he was detained in the Telok Pakau Drug Rehabilitation Centre for six months for smoking heroin.

The second-oldest child in a family of five siblings, Lee Kim Lai, aged 18, was attached to the Police Reserve Unit 1 at Mount Vernon for his National Service.

== Plot ==
On the night of 21 April 1978, the three friends gathered at a playground in Geylang Bahru to discuss a solution to the economic hardship that the three were experiencing. Ong Hwee Kuan proposed that they could rob illegal lottery operators. Because the other two did not protest, Hwee Kuan went on to suggest that a gun would be needed for such an act, although firearms were outlawed in Singapore. Yeo recalled his days serving as a police sentry at the PRU base and proposed stealing the gun from the sentry posted there. They could not come up with a feasible idea to commit the crime without attracting attention, however. The following day when the three met again, Yeo suggested approaching the sentry while dressed in his police uniform, with Chin Hock in his military attire, and threatening the sentry with ice picks. Chin Hock, however, felt the uniforms would only attract the attention of the camp guard, but none could think of a way to commit the act without anyone noticing. Yeo felt that the risk was worth taking and proposed to carry it out at 2:00 am on 25 April when the sentries were likely to be less alert.

On 24 April, they proceeded to pawn Chin Hock's watch in exchange for cash to buy two kitchen knives at about 9:00 pm, which Hwee Kuan felt were necessary to threaten the policemen. Yeo, particularly wary that they may be searched by patrolling policemen, brought the knives home, where he packed them together with four yellow nylon ropes, an ice pick and a pair of gloves in a traveling bag belonging to his brother. At 11:45 pm, they met for a final meal at Kallang Bahru, where Yeo proposed an alternative plan to steal a taxi. The taxi driver would be tied up with the nylon rope and the taxi would be driven to the PRU base by Chin Hock. Hwee Kuan would pretend to be drunk in the backseat while Yeo would approach the sentry for help and lure him to the taxi, whereupon they would seize the policeman, drive the taxi to a secluded spot and rob him of his service revolver. Hwee Kuan expressed concern that he may be recognised after the act by the abducted policeman or the taxi driver as he had a police record. Yeo suggested killing both men, to which Hwee Kuan was relieved and Chin Hock expressed no comment. They also abandoned the idea of wearing the uniforms.

== Murders ==
=== Murder of Chew Theng Hin ===
At about 1:30 am on 25 April 1978, the three men left the coffee shop and Yeo went home to change and collect the traveling bag. Dressed in a red T-shirt, he tucked the ice pick into his dark blue pants. Chin Hock was dressed in a white long sleeved top and dark blue pants, while Hwee Kuan was in a beige long sleeve top and blue jeans. The trio waited along Kallang Bahru near Block 66 for a taxi. Soon, a Yellow Top taxi stopped for them, driven by Chew Theng Hin (Note: His name is also spelled Chew Peng Hin.) (Chinese: 周天恩), aged 60. Yeo got into the front seat and instructed the driver to go to the PRU base. Hwee Kuan sat behind the driver, and Chin Hock behind Yeo. The taxi proceeded via Bendemeer Road, Whampoa East Road, Serangoon Road, and Upper Aljunied Road. Chew was instructed to stop the taxi near the rear gate of the PRU base at a dark and secluded stretch of the road.

Suddenly, Hwee Kuan restrained Chew from behind and placed a knife to his neck. Yeo stuffed a cloth into his mouth and warned him not to make any noise while brandishing the ice pick. He tied the driver with the nylon ropes and ordered him out of the taxi, when Chew suddenly attempted to break free from the aggressors. He was quickly subdued by Yeo and Chin Hock while Hwee Kuan stabbed Chew in the stomach. Yeo and Hwee Kuan pulled the driver out of the taxi and dumped him in a roadside drain as Chin Hock got into the driver's seat and prepared to move off. Just then, they spotted Chew attempting to climb out of the drain. Yeo and Hwee Kuan stabbed the man in the neck with the ice pick and knife respectively causing Chew to fall back into the drain. When they returned to the car, Chew was spotted again trying to climb out leading to a third round of stabbings. Chin Hock drove the taxi towards the main gate of the PRU base.

=== Murder of Lee Kim Lai ===
In the early morning of 25 April 1978, Lee, who was on sentry duty for the first time, took over the hourly sentry duty from fellow officer Koh Kah Kway at 2:00 am. He was issued with his service revolver, a .38 Webley & Scott, and ten rounds of ammunition, five of which were already loaded in the revolver. Soon after, the Yellow Top taxi approached the gate. The front seat passenger, Yeo, alighted from the taxi with the ice pick hidden in his waist and approached the sentry, flashing his NS Police Warrant. He lied to Lee that he and Hwee Kuan were from the PRU base and asked his help to carry Hwee Kuan from the backseat of the taxi, where he was apparently heavily drunk. Believing this to be a genuine emergency, Lee left his post and followed Yeo to the taxi.

Once Yeo opened the rear door of the taxi, he allowed Lee to look into the taxi first, whereupon Hwee Kuan quickly grabbed the surprised policeman and pulled him into the rear seat. Yeo helped to push the struggling man in, slammed the door shut and quickly returned to his front seat. This was witnessed by Mrs Heather Marican, the wife of a police inspector, who was in a building inside the PRU base. Yeo noticed what appeared to be figures looking in his direction from the police quarters and hurriedly asked Chin Hock to leave. As the taxi sped away along Upper Aljunied Road, Hwee Kuan stabbed the knife into Lee's neck and removed his revolver which was handed over to Yeo. As Hwee Kuan struggled to remove the blade from the cop's neck where it had become stuck, Yeo grabbed the second knife and stabbed the still-struggling Lee several more times in the neck and upper body from the front seat, in the midst of which he accidentally cut Hwee Kuan's index finger. By the time Lee's body had stopped moving, his blood had spilled all over the back seat and onto Hwee Kuan's clothes.

Chin Hock was instructed to stop the taxi five minutes later at Kallang Bahru, where Yeo rummaged the dead policeman's uniform and retrieved all ten rounds of ammunition. Yeo collected the knife from Hwee Kuan and instructed him to hide in the bushes while he and Chin Hock left the scene to collect clean clothing from Yeo's home. They returned ten minutes later and Chin Hock dumped the bloodied clothing into a plastic bag containing clean clothing he changed into. The three left. Later, in the vicinity, off-duty police officer Constable Siew Man Seng (Chinese: 萧万成) spotted Yeo and Hwee Kuan behaving suspiciously. Constable Siew proceeded to identify himself as a police officer; the two attempted to flee, Constable Siew gave chase and arrested Hwee Kuan while Yeo escaped.

== Arrest and investigation ==
At around the same time that Constable Siew arrested Ong Hwee Kuan, a patrol car spotted the abandoned taxi and found Lee's body with 15 cut and stab wounds in his upper body, including a fatal double stab wound in the neck. His service revolver was missing. Four hours later, the taxi driver Chew was also found dead in a drain near the Mount Vernon base with a stab wound in the abdomen. The following day, at a flat in Kallang Bahru, Yeo was arrested and Lee's service revolver and ten bullets were recovered. Ong Chin Hock surrendered himself to the police shortly after.

On 22 June 1978, while in police custody, Yeo and Hwee Kuan attempted to escape from a subordinate court, injuring several police officers in the process. They were later handcuffed. In September 1978, a preliminary hearing was conducted and the trio were ordered to stand trial on a later date for the double murder.

== Trial ==
On 30 April 1979, Yeo Ching Boon, Ong Hwee Kuan, and Ong Chin Hock stood trial for the murders. The prosecution was led by Deputy Public Prosecutor (DPP) Glenn Knight, who was assisted by DPP Roy Neighbour. Yeo was represented by Ram Goswami, Hwee Kuan by Loh Lin Kok, and Chin Hock by Alfred Tan. The trial judges were Justice Choor Singh and Justice T. S. Sinnathuray.

Yeo pleaded guilty to both charges of murder. His lawyer Goswami had explained and gone through the facts of the case with Yeo, but Yeo insisted on pleading guilty, knowing that the only punishment he could receive was death. The trial judges rejected Yeo's guilty plea and ordered the trial to continue. Yeo also mentioned that he had brought the weapons himself and his two accomplices were not aware of them. When questioned by DPP Knight, he denied that he was trying to take the blame for everything and avoid implicating his accomplices.

Ong Chin Hock, who had surrendered himself, said that he did not know that the taxi driver and sentry had died, and had only surrendered for a robbery and not murder. This was in contrast to his statement to the police, where he said he surrendered because his two accomplices had already been arrested. When questioned about this discrepancy, he said that he surrendered to "turn over a new leaf".

Chin Hock's police statement was found by the judge to be involuntary and inadmissible in court, despite Chin Hock himself stating that he was fairly treated by the police. This was because Chin Hock had been interrogated over a long period of six hours, and offered by the police to be a prosecution witness.

In the verdict, Justice Choor Singh, who pronounced the decision, rejected Hwee Kuan and Chin Hock's defence that there was no common intention among the three to commit murder, and they stated that there was an intention to commit the robbery and double murder, given that the trio had planned the crime before committing it and also brought along weapons like knives and an ice pick, indicating their purpose of using weapons to cause harm if necessary, and they had done so by stabbing both Lee and Chew for the revolver and taxi respectively. Justice Singh also emphasized that it was irrelevant to determine who had been directly responsible for stabbing either of the victims, as long as there was one or more perpetrators who had done so, and the stabbing had been done in furtherance of the common intention to rob the victims, and the intention to cause death was clear from the double stabbings. For this, the two judges agreed that there were sufficient grounds to convict the trio as charged. As a result, all three accused were found guilty of the double murder and sentenced to death.

Yeo chose to not appeal against his sentence, but both Ong Chin Hock and Ong Hwee Kuan appealed against the verdict. The Court of Appeal rejected the duo's appeal in April 1981, and in their full grounds of decision released in September 1981, the appellate court stated that there was sufficient evidence to prove the double murder charges against Chin Hock and Hwee Kuan, and hence turned down their appeals. Although Yeo already waived his right to appeal, his case was still subject to automatic review by the Court of Appeal given that the death penalty was concerned in this case, and the three judges decided to confirm the death penalty for Yeo since his conviction for murder was safe and not in error.

The trio were hanged in Changi Prison on 24 February 1984 at dawn. Shortly before their executions, the trio were allowed to have a last meal (although the exact order of food is unknown), and Yeo offered to donate his eyes. The identity of the recipient of Yeo's eyes is not known. During his time on death row, Yeo converted to Christianity and was baptized in April 1982. After he first became devoted to the religion before trial, Yeo became regretful over his involvement in the murders and this made him want to take the full blame for the double murder and state that both his friends Hwee Kuan and Chin Hock were unaware of the weapons he brought along, but this was not accepted by the court. Yeo reportedly did not appeal but he asked for his execution to be delayed as he wanted to spread his newfound faith to other prisoners and advocate for them to show repentance and change, and he even personally converted two other prisoners and one of his co-accused Hwee Kuan.

== Aftermath ==
Immediately following Lee's murder, Singapore Armed Forces soldiers began to assist police sentries at Mount Vernon PRU base for their sentry duties.

The murder of Lee made front-page news in relatively crime-free Singapore, and was particularly noted for the speed in which the case was solved. The case appeared in a compilation of notable crimes in a 1987 publication, 999 True Cases from the CID, and was re-enacted in a television drama, True Files, in 2002.

=== Publication ===
The robbery, kidnapping and murder of Lee was considered as a notable crime that shook Singapore. In July 2015, Singapore's national daily newspaper The Straits Times published a e-book titled Guilty As Charged: 25 Crimes That Have Shaken Singapore Since 1965, which included the case as one of the top 25 crimes that shocked the nation since its independence in 1965. The book was born out of collaboration between the Singapore Police Force and the newspaper itself.

== See also ==
- List of major crimes in Singapore
- Capital punishment in Singapore
- List of kidnappings
- List of Singapore police officers killed in the line of duty
