= Fast Response Car =

Official term for Singaporean police cars

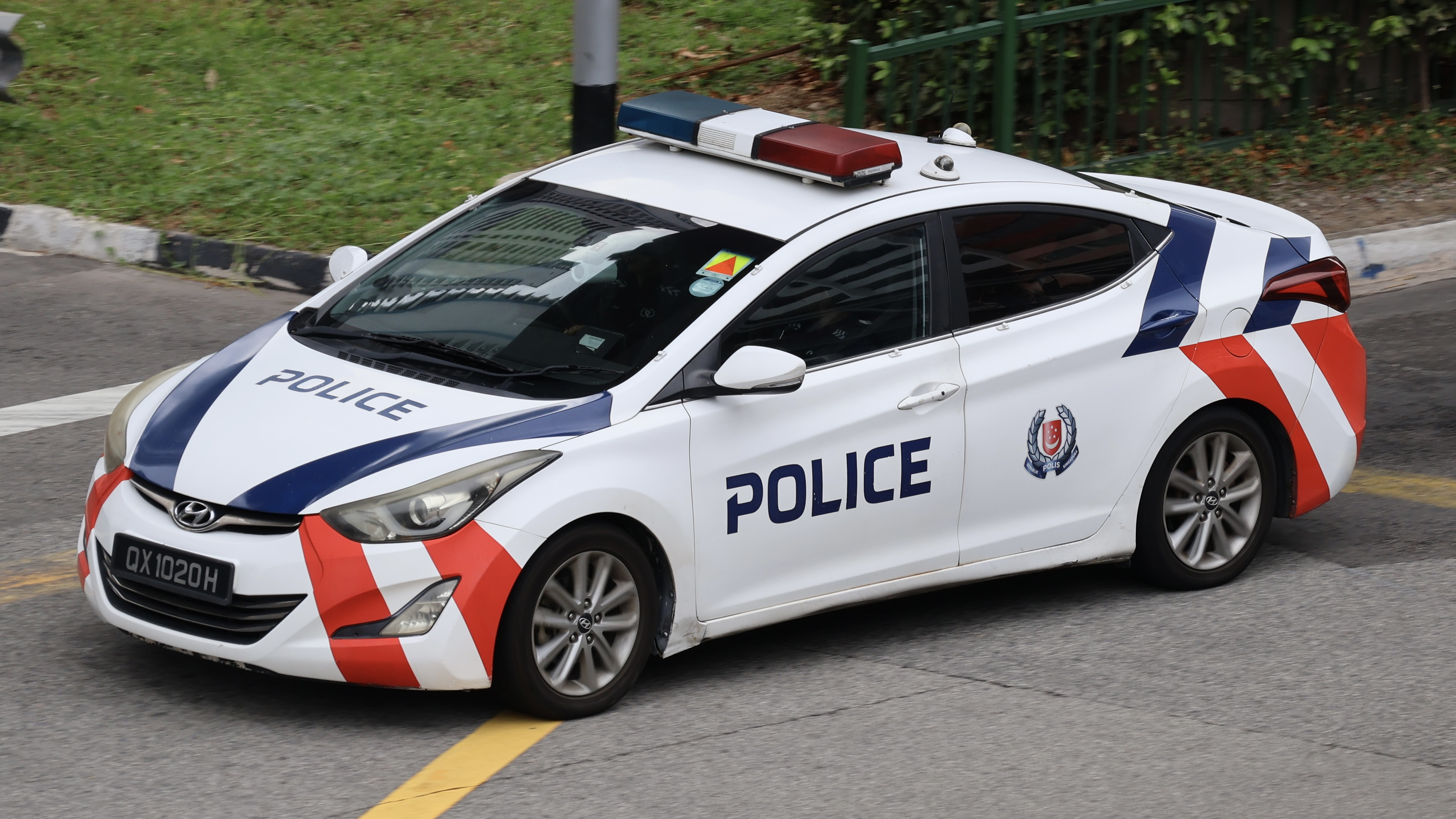
A Hyundai Elantra fast response car

The "Fast Response Car" (FRC) is the official term for police cars used by the Singapore Police Force. Prior to 2000, they were known in public simply as "police patrol cars".

FRCs are used for SPF deployments in urgent situations.

== History ==
Originally restricted to team leader vehicles during the 1990s, all current FRCs carry a large array of equipment to allow officers to conduct normal policing duties and basic investigative work which officers are expected to perform with the implementation of the Neighbourhood Police Centre (NPC) system. A typical FRC may therefore stock equipment for the force-opening of locked doors, conducting roadblocks, fingerprint collection, and the provision of first aid. Chemical agent protection equipment and bulletproof vests are also carried for the officer's protection.

In 2020, the SPF unveiled a type of FRC, which consist of Hyundai Tucson SUVs, with a remote-controlled searchlight on the roof, sensors under the side view mirrors, and cameras all around the vehicle. They are expected to replace all active FRCs by 2024. These vehicles were retrofitted as a project by the Home Team Science and Technology Agency (HTX) in cooperation with the SPF, known as the " Next-Generation Fast Response Car".

=== Fast Response Vehicle ===
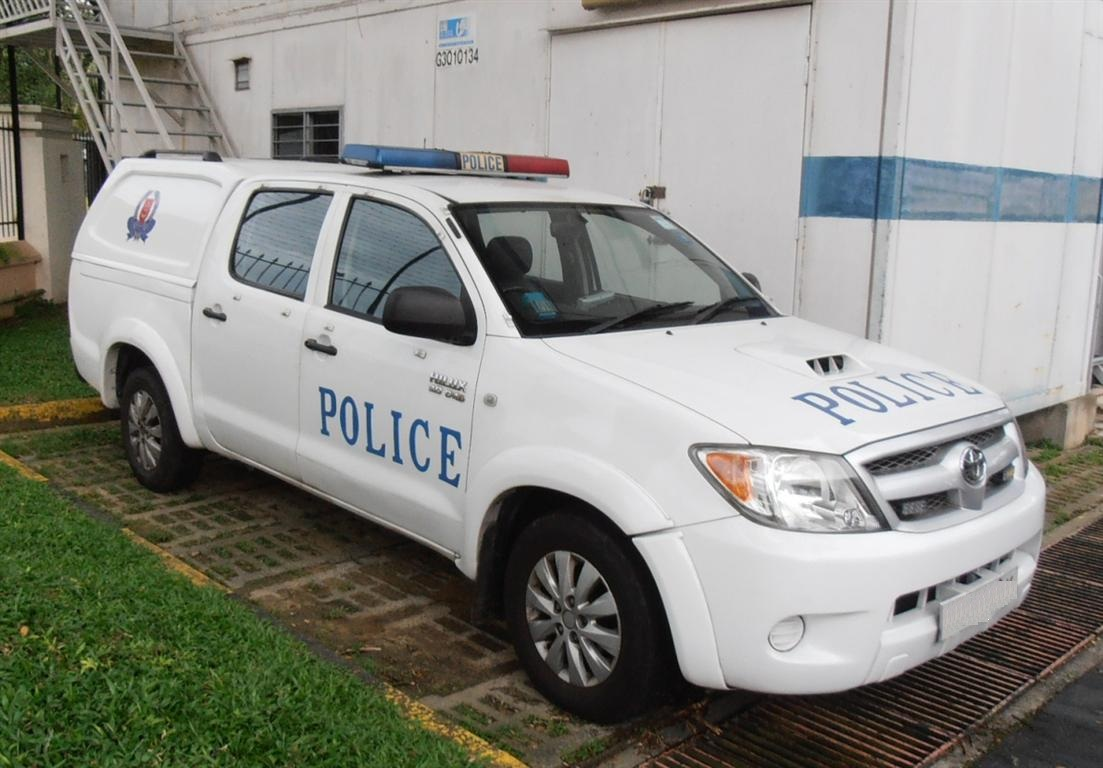
A Toyota Hilux Fast Response Vehicle

Originally unveiled in 2002 at the Singapore Police Force's annual workplan seminar, the Enhanced Patrol Vehicle Project was presented to highlight the need for police off-road capability. The Volvo V70 AWD XC, Mitsubishi Space Wagon and Mitsubishi Chariot underwent evaluation in various Neighbourhood Police Centres. They also provide bigger storage for additional equipment like undercarriage mirrors. All NPCs were to have at least three of such vehicles eventually, but as of 2006, only 6 have been purchased in total (3 Volvo V70 XCs, 3 Mitsubishi Space Wagons/Chariots).

The project underwent several evaluations and in 2004 was re-introduced to the public as the new Enhanced Fast Response Vehicle (FRV), using modified Toyota Hilux twin-cab diesel pick up trucks, more suited for prolonged heavy use on the roads. Achieving both the original and new requirements of the project, the new vehicles' bigger storage space allows easier storage and retrieval of equipment such as chemical agent protective suits and bullet-resistant vests. The SPF plans to have two of these vehicles at all NPCs.

== Fleet ==
=== Current ===
Make and Model	Type	Image	In service	Notes
Polestar 2 Long Range Dual Motor	Liftback		2025–present	Used exclusively by the Traffic Police Expressway Patrol Unit
BMW F30 325d M Sport	Sedan		2018–present	Used exclusively by the Traffic Police Expressway Patrol Unit
Chevrolet Cruze NB 1.6D	Sedan		2016–present	
Hyundai Avante HD 1.6	Sedan		2010–present	
Hyundai Elantra MD 1.6	Sedan		2014–present	
Hyundai Sonata NF 2.0	Sedan		2011–present	
Hyundai TL Tucson FL 1.6 GLS	Crossover SUV		2020–present	Next-Generation Fast Response Car. Approximately 300 vehicles to be delivered through 2024.
Mazda 3 1.5 Skyactiv-G	Sedan		2020–present	
Toyota Corolla Altis 1.6 (E120)	Sedan		2005–present	Mainly used for follow-up investigations.
Toyota Corolla Altis 1.6 (E140)	Sedan		2009–present	
Toyota RAV4 2.0	Crossover SUV		2022–present	Next-Generation Fast Response Car.
Volvo S80 T5 2.0	Sedan		2012–present	Used exclusively by the Traffic Police Expressway Patrol Unit

=== Former ===
- BMW E30 320i (Traffic Police)
- Ford Cortina
- Ford Escort
- Isuzu Gemini
- Mazda 323 BH
- Mazda 323 BJ
- Mitsubishi Lancer
- Mitsubishi Galant
- Nissan Pulsar
- Nissan Sunny (B15)
- Opel Vectra
- Subaru Impreza WRX (Traffic Police)
- Subaru Impreza GD
- Toyota Corolla (E110)
- Toyota Corona
- Volkswagen Beetle
- Volvo S40 (Traffic Police)
