= Station inspector =

Station inspector is a police rank used in some countries.

== Singapore ==
=== Singapore Police Force ===
Station inspector is the highest non-commissioned rank in the Singapore Police Force, below inspector, and above senior staff sergeant. Station inspectors wear a rank insignia of two point-up chevrons, the Singapore coat of arms and a garland below.

=== National Police Cadet Corps ===
The rank of station inspector is awarded to cadets who have contributed greatly to their National Police Cadet Corps unit. NPCC station inspectors wear a yellow flash on their beret. The rank is above staff sergeant, and is the highest rank a cadet can attain while they are in secondary school. It is below the rank of cadet inspector trainee.

Station inspectors wear the letters 'NPCC' below their rank insignia to differentiate them from Singapore Police Force personnel.

== British Metropolitan Police ==
The term was used by the Metropolitan Police in London from 1880 to 1949. It was the official rank used by inspectors to distinguish them from the more senior sub-divisional inspectors. Both ranks had one star (or "pip") as their insignia and their titles were considered appointments. The sub-divisional inspector later received two stars in 1922 to reduce confusion between the two levels of command.

In 1936 the rank of junior station inspector was created for Metropolitan Police College cadets and those thereafter completing their probationary period at a police station. To differentiate between the trainee rank and the appointed rank a new rank badge was created. One rectangular bar was placed under the star for a junior station inspector and two rectangular bars was placed under the star for a full station inspector. The rank of junior station inspector was abolished in 1938 and the Metropolitan Police College was closed in 1939. The insignia for junior station inspector was used until 1941, when the last graduates who held the rank had completed their probationary period.

In 1941, the rank of temporary or probationary inspector was granted one star, the rank of station inspector received two stars, and the rank of sub-divisional inspector received three stars. In 1949, the inspector ranks were reorganised. The rank of station inspector was changed to inspector and the rank of sub-divisional inspector abolished.

Rank	Years active	Rank insignia	Rank	Years active	Rank insignia	Rank	Years active	Rank insignia
			Junior station inspector	1936–1941		Probationary/temporary inspector	1941–?	
Station inspector	1880–1936		Station inspector	1936–1941		Station inspector	1941–1949	
Sub-divisional Inspector	1880–1922		Sub-divisional inspector	1922–1949		Sub-divisional inspector	1941–1949	

== See also ==
- Police ranks of the United Kingdom
