= Timeline of Singaporean history =

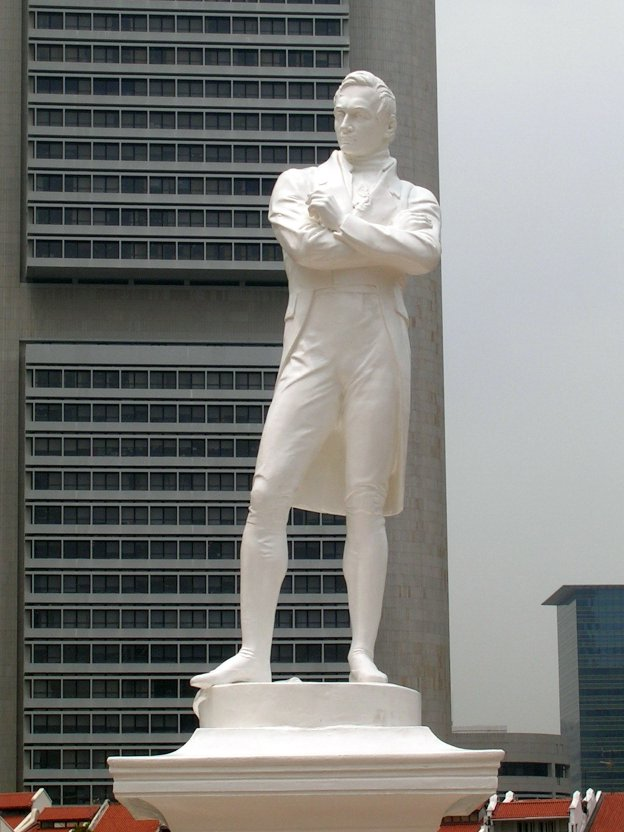
Statue of Stamford Raffles, the first British governor of Singapore

This is a timeline of Singaporean history, comprising important legal and territorial changes and political events in Singapore and its predecessor states. To read about the background to these events, see History of Singapore. See also the list of years in Singapore.

== 11th to 12th century ==
Year	Date	Event
1025		The region was invaded and occupied by Rajendra Chola of the Chola empire in India, although there has been no record of them visiting the island itself.

== 13th century ==
Year	Date	Event
1299		According to the Malay Annals, the Kingdom of Singapura was founded by Sang Nila Utama, a prince of Srivijaya. The kingdom existed till 1398.

== 14th century ==
Year	Date	Event
1320		The Mongol court sends a mission to obtain elephants from Long Ya Men (or Dragon's Tooth Strait), believed to be Keppel Harbour.
1330		The Chinese traveller Wang Dayuan visits Temasek and records an attack by Siam, recording it down alongside Long Ya Men and Ban Zu.
1398		Parameswara, the last Srivijayan prince, flees from Temasek.

== 15th century ==
Year	Date	Event
1414		Temasek becomes part of the Sultanate of Malacca established by Parameswara.

== 16th century ==
Year	Date	Event
1511	15 August	Malacca fell and was sacked by Afonso de Albuquerque of Portuguese Empire. See Portuguese Malacca.

== 17th century ==
Year	Date	Event
1613		Portuguese burn down the trading outpost at the mouth of Singapore River.
1641	14 January	Fall of Portuguese Malacca to Dutch.

== 19th century ==
Year	Date	Event
1819	29 January	Sir Stamford Raffles arrives in Singapore with William Farquhar to establish a trading post for the British East India Company.
1819	6 February	The treaty is signed between Sultan Hussein of Johor, Temenggong Abdul Rahman and Sir Stamford Raffles.
1819	6 February	William Farquhar is installed as the first Resident of the settlement.
1821		Singapore General Hospital was established.
1822		Raffles drafts the Raffles Plan of Singapore to reorganise the island.
1823	27 May	Dr John Crawfurd appointed as second Resident of the settlement.
1823	5 June	Raffles Institution is founded by Sir Stamford Raffles.
1824	17 March	The Anglo-Dutch Treaty is signed between Great Britain and the Netherlands.
1824	2 August	Singapore becomes a British colony.
1826		Singapore becomes part of the British colony of Straits Settlements under the rule of the East India Company, together with Malacca and Penang.
1826	27 November	Robert Fullerton was installed as the first Governor of the Straits Settlements.
1830		Singapore comes under the Presidency of Bengal in India.
1830	12 November	Robert Ibbetson was appointed as the second Governor of the Straits Settlements.
1832	December	Singapore becomes the centre of government of the Straits Settlements.
1833	7 December	Kenneth Murchison was appointed as the third Governor of the Straits Settlements.
1834	1 August	Singapore Free School was established.
1836	18 November	Sir Samuel George Bonham was appointed as the fourth Governor of the Straits Settlements.
1842		St. Margaret's Girls School was founded by Maria Tarn Dyer, the first and oldest all-girls school in Singapore.
1843		Thomas Dunman, the first full-time police chief of Singapore, improves the police force as well as the pay and working hours of policemen.
1843	January	Singapore became ruled directly from the British East India Company.
1843	August	William John Butterworth was appointed as the Governor of the Straits Settlements.
1844	4 March	Raffles Girls' School was established at Bras Basah Road.
1844	25 July	The Tan Tock Seng Hospital begins operation.
1845	15 July	The Straits Times was established as The Straits Times and Singapore Journal of Commerce.
1852		A new deep harbour called New Harbour, later known as Keppel Harbour, is built.
1852	22 July	St Joseph's Institution [as St John's Institution] was established at Bras Basah Road.
1854		Convent of the Holy Infant Jesus (CHIJ) was established.
1855	21 March	Edmund Augustus Blundell was appointed as the Governor of the Straits Settlements upon the retirement of William John Butterworth.
1858		Singapore is placed under the hierarchy of the Government of India (Calcutta), remaining as part of the Straits Settlements.
1858	8 March	Commercial Square is renamed Raffles Place.
1859	6 August	Major General Sir Orfeur Cavenagh was appointed as the Governor of the Straits Settlements.
1859		The Singapore Botanic Gardens was founded.
1862	8 September	Saint Andrews School was founded at Chin Chew Street.
1867	16 March	Major General Sir Harry St. George Ord was appointed as the Governor of the Straits Settlements.
1867	1 April	Straits Settlements become a crown colony of British Empire.
1867	1 April	The Legislative Council of the Straits Settlements was formed.
1869	17 November	The Suez Canal opens, and Singapore enjoys the increase in trade.
1873	4 November	Sir Andrew Clarke was appointed as the Governor of the Straits Settlements upon the retirement of Sir Harry St. George Ord.
1875	8 May	Sir William Jervois was appointed as the Governor of the Straits Settlements.
1876		Victoria School was established in Kampong Glam.
1877	3 April	Major General Edward Archibald Harbord Anson was appointed as the Acting Governor of the Straits Settlements.
1877	3 May	The Chinese Protectorate is set up, and William Pickering was the first Protector appointed.
1877	August	Sir William Cleaver Francis Robinson was appointed as the Governor of the Straits Settlements.
1879	10 February	Major General Edward Archibald Harbord Anson was appointed as the Acting Governor of the Straits Settlements.
1880	16 May	Sir Frederick Weld was appointed as the Governor of the Straits Settlements.
1885		Gan Eng Seng School was established at Telok Ayer Street.
1886	1 March	Anglo-Chinese School was established at Amoy Street.
1887	25 July	Methodist Girls' School was established at Short Street.
1887	17 October	Sir Cecil Clementi Smith was appointed as the Governor of the Straits Settlements.
1887	1 December	The Raffles Hotel was established.
1888		Henry Ridley becomes the first scientific director of the Singapore Botanic Gardens.
1888		The Singapore Fire Brigade was formed.
1892		The Tanjong Pagar Police Station opens, and many Sikh policemen were recruited.
1892		Holy Innocents' High School was established.
1893	30 August	William Edward Maxwell was appointed as the Acting Governor of the Straits Settlements.
1894	1 February	Sir Charles Bullen Hugh Mitchell was appointed as the Governor of the Straits Settlements.
1899	1 July	Singapore Chinese Girls' School was established at 52 Hill Street.
1899	7 December	Sir Charles Bullen Hugh Mitchell died while in the office as Governor of the Straits Settlements.
1899	7 December	James Alexander Swettenham was appointed as the Acting Governor of the Straits Settlements.

== 20th century ==
Year	Date	Event
1901	1 January	Singapore-Kranji Railway officially opened to the public.
1901	5 November	Sir Frank Swettenham was appointed as the Governor of the Straits Settlements.
1904	16 April	Sir John Anderson was appointed as the Governor of the Straits Settlements.
1905	1 June	Singapore change its time zone to GMT+07:00 from the original GMT+6hr 55m 25s.
1906	18 November	Tao Nan School was established.
1906		The Nanyang branch of Tongmenghui was set up in Singapore.
1910	12 March	Anderson Bridge was official opened by Governor Sir John Anderson.
1911	2 September	Sir Arthur Young was appointed as the Governor of the Straits Settlements.
1913	1 July	The Singapore Harbour board was set up.
1915	15 – 25 February	The Singapore Mutiny occurred as British Muslim Indian sepoys rose up against the British.
1917	15 August	Nanyang Girls' High School was established by Tan Chor Nam and Teo Eng Hock, partially due to Dr Sun Yat Sen's belief in education for girls, in Dhoby Ghaut.
1917	14 June	Nan Hua High School [as Nam Wah Girls' School] established by Mr Xiong Shangfu, its campus in Coleman Street, and it was once a base for the Japanese soldiers during the Japanese occupation.
1919	21 March	The Chinese High School established by Tan Kah Kee at 15 Niven Road.
1920	17 February	Sir Laurence Guillemard was appointed as the Governor of the Straits Settlements.
1923		Singapore starts constructing the main British naval base in East Asia.
1924	28 June	Singapore-Johor Causeway officially opens.
1927	3 June	Sir Hugh Clifford was appointed as the Governor of the Straits Settlements.
1927	7 November	St James Power Station was officially opened by governor Sir Hugh Clifford.
1929		Singapore Police Academy was established at Mount Pleasant Road.
1930	5 February	Sir Cecil Clementi was appointed as the Governor of the Straits Settlements.
1932	15 January	Tanjong Pagar Railway Station commenced operation.
1932		Jalan Besar Stadium open to the public.
1933	1 January	Singapore change its time zone to GMT+07:20.
1933	16 January	CHIJ Saint Nicholas Girls' School, Singapore's only bilingual and bicultural IJ school, was founded.
1934	9 November	Sir Shenton Thomas was appointed as the Governor of the Straits Settlements.
1935		Catholic High School was established.
1937	12 June	Kallang Airport was opened.
1938		British Military Hospital, predecessor of Alexandra Hospital was established.
1938		Singapore completes the main British naval base, which is the largest drydock and third largest floating dock in the world.
1939	24 January	Chung Cheng High School (Main) was established in Kim Yam Road.
1940	July	British Military Hospital at Alexandra Road was officially open.
1941	1 September	Singapore change its time zone to GMT+07:30.
1941	7 – 8 December	In an extensive three-pronged attack, Japan opens hostilities with the countries that opposed the Axis powers and their colonies. First air raid on Singapore at 4:15 am. The Imperial Japanese Army invades Malaya.
1941	10 December	The British battleship HMS Prince of Wales and battlecruiser HMS Repulse are sunk by Japanese bombers.
1941	16 December	Second air raid on Singapore, at night. Only RAF Tengah is attacked.
1941	25 December	A lone Japanese aircraft drops propaganda pamphlets on Singapore Island.
1941	29 December	Second Japanese air raid on Singapore City (and third on the island), at night. Nightly raids commence.
1941	30 December	The Overseas Chinese Mobilization Council is set up in Singapore, led by Tan Kah Kee.
1942	12 January	First major daylight air raid on Singapore. Henceforth, the island is bombed everyday up to the British surrender (with the exception of 19 January).
1942	31 January	Malaya falls to the Japanese and the Causeway is blown up to delay Japan's advancement to Singapore.
1942	1 February	The siege of Singapore begins. The Japanese in Johor Bahru begin shelling the island daily in addition to daily aerial bombing.
1942	8 February	The Japanese cross the Straits of Johor by inflatable boats and landed in Singapore during the Battle of Singapore.
1942	11 February	The Japanese and Allied soldiers fight fiercely at Bukit Timah.
1942	13 February	The Malay regiment, led by Lt. Adnan bin Saidi, fight bravely against the Japanese at Pasir Panjang Ridge in the Battle of Pasir Panjang.
1942	14 February	The Japanese have captured most of Singapore, and most of the population is crammed into the city centre.
1942	15 February	The British surrenders and the Japanese occupation of Singapore starts. Singapore is renamed Syonan-to (Light of the South Island).
1942	15 February	Singapore change its time zone to GMT+09:00 to be the same as Japan.
1942	18 February – 4 March	The Japanese military police, the Kempeitai kills an estimated 25,000 to 50,000 people during Sook Ching Massacre.
1943	27 September	Operation Jaywick occurred. Seven Japanese ships are bombed at Clifford Pier.
1943	10 October	The Japanese initiate the Double Tenth Incident in response to Operation Jaywick, by launching a fierce crackdown on anti-Japanese elements and Allied prisoners-of-war in Singapore.
1944	27 March	Lim Bo Seng is captured by the Japanese, and dies after 3 months of torture.
1945	14 August	Japan surrenders, and there is anomie and looting for nearly a month when the British do not return immediately.
1945	5 September	The British return to Singapore after the end of World War II and begin the British Military Administration of the Straits Settlements under the command of Lord Louis Mountbatten.
1945	12 September	Singapore revert its time zone back to the pre-war time of GMT+07:30.
1946	1 April	The Straits Settlements is dissolved and Singapore becomes a separate crown colony.
1946	1 April	The Legislative Council of the Colony of Singapore was formed.
1946	1 April	Sir Franklin Charles Gimson was appointed as the Governor of the Singapore.
1947		A large number of strikes occur causing stoppages in public transport, public services and the harbour.
1947	May	Severe food shortage leads to record-low rice ration, causing malnutrition, disease and outbreak of crime and violence.
1948	20 March	
1948	24 June	Rubber plantations and tin mines in Malaya are destroyed by communists, and the British declares the state of Emergency over Singapore and Malaya. The emergency was officially lifted on 31 July 1960 by the Malayan government.
1949		The University of Malaya is formed following the merger of Raffles College and King Edward Medical College.
1950	11 – 13 December	The Maria Hertogh riots occur. 18 people are killed.
1951	10 April	The number of elected seats is increased to 9 in the second election.
1952	20 March	Wilfred Lawson Blythe was appointed as the Acting Governor of the Singapore.
1952	21 April	Sir John Fearns Nicoll was appointed as the Governor of the Singapore.
1953		Rendel Commission is appointed to make recommendations for Singapore's self-government.
1954	13 May	Chinese school students demonstrate against the British due to the National Service proposal. See Anti-National Service Riots
1955	2 April	
1955	12 May	Four people are killed during the Hock Lee bus riots.
1955	2 June	William Goode was appointed as the Acting Governor of the Singapore.
1955	30 June	Sir Robert Black was appointed as the Governor of the Singapore.
1955	20 August	Kallang Airport ceased operation. Paya Lebar Airport started operation.
1956	9 January	Anglican High School was founded by the Chinese speaking congregations of the Anglican Churches in Singapore.
1956	7 June	David Marshall appeals to the United Kingdom for full self-government, but resigns when he fails. Lim Yew Hock takes over as Chief Minister.
1956	10 October	Riots by pro-communist Chinese school students occur when government closes down a student union on 24 September 1956.
1956	14 October	Dunman High School (formally known as Singapore Government Chinese Middle School), became the first Chinese secondary school established by the government.
1957		Cedar Girls' Secondary School was founded.
1957	9 December	Sir William Goode was appointed as the Governor of the Singapore.
1959	March	
1959	30 May	3rd general elections (limited self-government) held. People's Action Party wins 43 of 51 seats and Lee Kuan Yew became the first Prime Minister.
1959	3 June	A celebration is held at the Padang for Singapore gaining full self-government.
1959	3 June	Sir William Goode becomes the Yang di-Pertuan Negara of Singapore.
1959	3 December	The national anthem Majulah Singapura, written by Zubir Said, is presented.
1959	3 December	Encik Yusof bin Ishak becomes the Yang di-Pertuan Negara of Singapore.
1960	1 February	The Housing and Development Board is set up.
1960	8 September	Tan Howe Liang became Singapore's first Olympic medalist. He finished second among 35 competitors in the lightweight category in weightlifting at the 1960 games held in Rome, Italy.
1961	25 May	The Bukit Ho Swee fire kills four people and destroys 2,200 attap houses.
1961	27 May	Tunku Abdul Rahman, the Prime Minister of Malaya, proposes a merger between Singapore, Malaya, Sabah and Sarawak.
1962	1 September	A referendum is held in Singapore to vote on merger with Malaysia.
1963	2 February	During Operation Coldstore, 107 left-wing politicians and trade unionists are arrested by Internal Security Department
1963	9 July	The Malaysia Agreement is signed between leaders of Malaya, Singapore, Sabah and Sarawak.
1963	31 August	In this Malaysia Solidarity Day, Lee Kuan Yew declares de facto Independence for Singapore.
1963	16 September	Malaysia is formed. Indonesia carries out its konfrontasi campaign.
1963	16 September	Encik Yusof bin Ishak becomes the Yang di-Pertuan Negara of Singapura.
1963	21 September	The PAP wins the 1963 State Elections, defeating the Barisan Sosialis and UMNO.
1964	25 April	The PAP wins one seat in the Malaysian Federal Election. UMNO is outraged.
1964	21 July	An ethnic riot between various Malays and Chinese, on Prophet Muhammad's birthday, 23 people are killed.
1965	10 March	Indonesian saboteurs carry out the MacDonald House bombing, killing three people.
1965	May	Lee Kuan Yew begins campaigning for a Malaysian Malaysia
1965	7 August	Singapore and Malaysia sign the separation agreement.
1965	9 August	The Malaysian Parliament votes to expel Singapore from the Federation; Singapore becomes independent after separating from Malaysia.
1965	21 September	Singapore is admitted into the United Nations as the 117th member.
1965	15 October	Singapore becomes the 23rd member of the Commonwealth of Nations.
1965	22 December	Constitutional Amendment Act is passed and Encik Yusof bin Ishak becomes the first President of Singapore.
1966	3 August	Singapore became the 104th member of the International Monetary Fund (IMF) and the World Bank.
1966	24 August	The first daily recitation of the pledge of allegiance before the national flag was taken by 500,000 students at all 529 government and aided schools.
1967		The Civilian Memorial is unveiled at the Kranji War Cemetery
1967	14 March	The National Service bill is passed in the parliament.
1967	28 March – 18 April	Registrations for national service begins at the Central Manpower Base.
1967	12 June	The issue of the first Singapore dollar.
1967	8 August	Singapore joined the Association of Southeast Asian Nations (ASEAN) as one of the founding members.
1967	17 August	The first batch of the army is drafted for national service.
1968	January	Britain announces its intention to withdraw its armed forces from Singapore.
1968	19 April	The PAP wins all seats in the 1968 General Election, which is boycotted by Barisan Sosialis.
1968		National Archives was established.
1969	20 January	The National Junior College, Singapore's first junior college was established.
1969	31 May	The 1969 race riots of Singapore broke out after growing tension of the 13 May incident in Malaysia spilled over to Singapore.
1970	23 November	Encik Yusof bin Ishak, first President of Singapore died while in office.
1971	2 January	Dr Benjamin Henry Sheares becomes the second President of Singapore.
1971	31 October	The last British military forces withdraws from Singapore.
1972	2 September	The PAP wins the 1972 General Election.
1972	1 October	The Singapore Airlines is formed.
1973	4 February	The first Chingay parade is held in Singapore.
1973	14 July	The Presidential Council for Minority Rights is set up to ensure minority would not be discriminated.
1973	21 July	The construction of the National Stadium is completed and open in Kallang.
1974	15 January	Hwa Chong Junior College, Singapore's first government-aided junior college was established.
1974	31 January	Laju incident: Japanese Red Army bombs petroleum tanks at Pulau Bukom and hijacks a ferry boat.
1974	March	The construction of Jurong Town Hall is completed.
1976	23 December	The PAP wins all 69 seats in the 1976 General Election.
1976		St James Power Station was decommissioned and its operations is taken over by Pasir Panjang and Jurong power stations.
1978	12 October	Spyros disaster, was a major industrial disaster which claimed 76 lives.
1979	1 June	First National Courtesy Campaign was launched.
1979		Singapore becomes the world's second busiest port in terms of shipping tonnage.
1980	23 December	The PAP wins all 75 seats in the 1980 General Election.
1981	12 May	Dr Benjamin Henry Sheares (second President of Singapore) died while in office.
1981	1 July	Paya Lebar Airport ceased operation and Singapore Changi Airport starts operation.
1981	23 October	C V Devan Nair becomes the third President of Singapore.
1981	31 October	Workers' Party of Singapore's Joshua Benjamin Jeyaretnam elected into Parliament, breaking a 16 years PAP monopoly of the House.
1982	1 January	Singapore change its time zone to UTC+08:00.
1982		The Civil Defence Programme are launched.
1983	29 January	(Singapore Cable Car disaster) Eniwetok, a Panamanian-registered oil rig, hits the Singapore Cable Car system, sending two cabins plunging into the sea and killing seven people.
1984	22 August	Non-Constituency Member of Parliament was introduced.
1984	22 December	The PAP wins the 1984 General Election while two members of the opposition parties are elected as members of parliament. Three PAP women MPs are also elected, ending a 16 years absence of women representation in Parliament.
1985	28 March	C V Devan Nair stepped down as the third President of Singapore.
1985	2 September	Wee Kim Wee becomes the fourth President of Singapore.
1985		Singapore went into its first ever recession which was induced by government policies.
1986	15 March	Collapse of Hotel New World, killing 33 people and injuring 17 others.
1987	21 May	16 people were arrested during Operation Spectrum and detained under the Internal Security Act. Another six were arrested on 20 June.
1988	3 September	The PAP wins the 1988 General Election and group representation constituencies (GRC)s are introduced.
1990	6 July	The East–West Line of the Mass Rapid Transit (MRT) is completed.
1990	22 November	Singapore Changi Airport Terminal 2 begins operation.
1990	28 November	Goh Chok Tong becomes the second Prime Minister of Singapore.
1991	26 March	Four Pakistanis hijack Singapore Airlines Flight 117 and demand the release of Pakistan Peoples Party members from Pakistani jails.
1991	27 March	Members of the Singapore Special Operations Force storm into Singapore Airlines Flight 117, killing all hijackers and freeing all passengers and crew members.
1991	31 August	General elections are held. The result is a victory for the PAP, which wins 77 out of 81 seats.
1993	August	National Archives of Singapore was formed.
1993	1 September	Ong Teng Cheong becomes the first elected President and fifth President of Singapore.
1994	5 May	American teenager Michael P. Fay is convicted and caned for vandalism.
1996		The parliament passes the Maintenance of Parents law, a private member's bill introduced by Nominated Member of Parliament Woon Cheong Ming Walter.
1997	2 January	PAP led by Goh Chok Tong wins a total of 81 out of 83 seats in the 1997 general election.
1997	19 December	Silkair Flight 185 crashes into Musi River near Palembang, Sumatra, killing all 104 people on board.
1998	15 January	Singapore and United States announces agreement for US ships to use a planned $35 million naval base from 2000.
1998	September	"The Singapore Story", the first volume of Lee Kuan Yew's memoirs is published. (Li, Guangyao; Lee, Kuan Yew (1998). The Singapore Story: Memoirs of Lee Kuan Yew. Prentice-Hall. ISBN 978-0130208033.)
1999	1 September	S. R. Nathan becomes the sixth President of Singapore.
1999		Singapore slips into recession during the 1997 Asian financial crisis.
2000	1 September	Speakers' Corner is launched at Hong Lim Park.
2000	31 October	Singapore Airlines Flight 006 crashes during take-off in Chiang Kai Shek International Airport, killing 83 people.
2000		"From Third World to First, The Singapore Story 1965-2000" the second volume of Lee Kuan Yew's memoirs is published. (From Third World to First, The Singapore Story 1965-2000. 3 August 1998. ISBN 978-9812049841.)

== 21st century ==
Year	Date	Event
2001		Economic recession in Singapore. (to 2003)
2001	January	A pipeline feeding gas to Singapore from Indonesia's Natuna field in South China Sea opens.
2001	3 November	The PAP wins 82 of 84 seats in the 2001 General Election.
2001	9 December	15 suspected militants of Jemaah Islamiah are arrested for alleged bomb plot.
2001	27 December	Tropical Storm Vamei, a rare tropic storm that occurs only once in 100 to 400 years, hits Singapore.
2002	13 January	Singapore and Japan sign the Japan-Singapore Economic Agreement.
2002	12 October	The Esplanade – Theatres on the Bay officially opened as Singapore's major performing arts centre.
2003	1 March - 16 July	SARS virus outbreak in Singapore.
2003	6 May	Singapore and United States sign the United States-Singapore Free Trade Agreement (USS-FTA).
2003	29 October	A major research center Biopolis opens.
2004	20 April	A section of Nicoll Highway collapses, killing 4 people.
2004	12 August	Lee Hsien Loong, Lee Kuan Yew's son becomes the third Prime Minister.
2004	December	National Service was reduced from two and half years to two years.
2005	15 January	Singapore and Malaysia settle dispute over land reclamation work.
2005	18 April	The government approves the plan to legalise casino-gambling and build two Integrated Resorts.
2005	8 July	In the aftermath of 7 July 2005 – London bombings, Transport Minister Yeo Cheow Tong announces plan to set up a new Police MRT Unit to enhance the security of Singapore's public transport. (CNA)
2005	17 August	S R Nathan returns for his second term as President, following a walkover in the 2005 Singapore presidential election.
2005	27 August	White Elephant Incident at Buangkok MRT station.
2005	31 December	Singapore Police Academy ceased operational. Home Team Academy replaces the Police Academy and went operational on the following day at Old Choa Chu Kang Road.
2006	6 May	The PAP, led by Lee Hsien Loong, wins 82 of 84 seats in the General Election.
2006	26 March	Singapore Changi Airport opens the Budget Terminal.
2007	20 May	The Marina Bay Floating Platform was opened.
2007	30 June	The Former National Stadium was closed for re-construction.
2008	9 January	Singapore Changi Airport opens its third passenger terminal.
2008	21 February	The International Olympic Committee (IOC) awards the Youth Olympic Games hosting rights to Singapore ahead of Moscow by a vote of 53 to 44.
2008	27 February	Jemiah Islamiah terrorist head Mas Selamat bin Kastari escapes from prison.
2008	September	Singapore slips into recession due to the 2008 financial crisis. World economies hit badly; banks around the world collapse.
2008	16 October	Singapore government guarantees all local and foreign currency fixed deposits with a $150 billion pool due to the 2008 financial crisis, joining governments around the world.
2010	14 August - 26 August	The 2010 Summer Youth Olympics were held.
2011	7 May	PAP loses its grip on Aljunied Group Representation Constituency to the Workers' Party in the General Election. This is the first time an opposition party has captured a GRC since the inception of this scheme in 1988.
2011	28 May	Universal Studios Singapore held its grand opening.
2011	1 July	Tanjong Pagar Railway Station ceased operation and to be reserved as the Singapore Railway Museum.
2011	27 August	Singaporeans, for the first time since the establishment of Presidential Election, will be voting for the next President after the 6th President of Singapore – SR Nathan stepped down on 31 August 2011. The candidates involves in this election includes – Dr Tan Keng Yam Tony, Mr Tan Jee Say, Mr Tan Kin Lian and Dr. Tan Cheng Bock.
2011	1 September	Dr Tan Keng Yam Tony is sworn as the seventh President of Singapore.
2012	25 September	Singapore Changi Airport closes The Budget Terminal to make way for the construction of future Singapore Changi Airport Terminal 4.
2013	16 February	More than 3000 Singaporeans gathered at the Speakers' Corner, Singapore at Hong Lim Park for a non-partisan protest against the government's Population White Paper which projected a possible 6.9 million people in Singapore by 2030.
2013	24 June	Haze in Singapore reaches 401 PSI, the worst in Singapore history.
2013	8 December	The 2013 Little India riot took place after a fatal accident occurred at the junction of Race Course Road and Hampshire Road in Little India, Singapore.
2014	12 January	Beginning construction of the new Thomson–East Coast MRT line (Thomson stretch) consisting of 31 new stations (including 7 interchanges).
2014	30 June	The new National Stadium re-opened to the public after re-construction.
2015	23 March	Lee Kuan Yew passes away. Singapore enters a one-week mourning period.
2015	30 June	Ng Teng Fong General Hospital commences operation.
2015	22 July	Jurong Community Hospital commences operation.
2015	9 August	Singapore turns 50.
2015	11 September	The PAP wins 83 of 89 seats in the 2015 General Election.
2016	21 July	Beginning construction of the new Thomson–East Coast MRT line (East Coast stretch).
2016	22 August	S R Nathan passes away. Singapore enters a one-week mourning period.
2017	11 February	Nearly 300 year old Tembusu tree at Singapore Botanic Gardens falls, killing one and injured 4 others.
2017	17 April	Othman Wok passes away. Singapore enters a one-week mourning period.
2017	13–14 September	Halimah Yacob is elected as the first female president and eighth President of Singapore.
2017	31 October	Singapore Changi Airport opens its fourth passenger terminal.
2018	12 June	Singapore hosted the Singapore Summit, a summit meeting between North Korea and United States leaders.
2018	18 August	Sengkang General Hospital opened to public.
2018	19 November	A new passenger terminal in Seletar Airport opened, replacing the old building.
2019	28 January	Singapore celebrates the 200th Anniversary of the foundation of modern Singapore by Stamford Raffles.
2019	17 April	Jewel Changi Airport opens after a week-long preview.
2020	23 January	The first COVID-19 case in Singapore was confirmed involving a 66-year-old Chinese national from Wuhan.
2020	10 July	The PAP wins 83 of 93 seats in the 2020 General Election.
2022	1 April	Singapore transition to the phase of Living with COVID-19 endemic.
2023	May	The CPIB of Singapore investigates Ministers K. Shanmugam and Vivian Balakrishnan after accusations regarding their Ridout Road state-owned bungalows rentals.
2023	5 June	Raffles Institution celebrates its bicentennial (200th year).
2023	11-12 July	Minister of Transport S. Iswaran and tycoon Ong Beng Seng is arrested as part of a CPIB probe.
2023	17 July	Speaker of Parliament Tan Chuan-Jin and MP for Tampines GRC (Tampines East) Cheng Li Hui simultaneously resign due to "propriety and personal conduct". Investigations into the matter confirmed that both were having an extramarital affair.
2023	19 July	MP for Aljunied GRC (Serangoon) Leon Perera and Nicole Seah resign from office due to a leaked video showing an inappropriate exchange between the two. Later it was found that they were having an extramarital affair.
2023	14 September	Tharman Shanmugaratnam is sworn in as Singapore’s ninth President of Singapore. He is the first non-Chinese presidential candidate to win in a contested presidential election in Singapore.
2024	18 January	S. Iswaran resigns as Minister for Transport, Member of Parliament for West Coast GRC, and from People's Action Party after being charged with 27 counts relating to bribery and corruption by the CPIB. Chee Hong Tat succeeds Iswaran as Transport Minister.
2024	28 February	Ahmed Salim becomes the first death row offender executed for murder in Singapore since 2019. The Bangladeshi painter was convicted for killing his Indonesian ex-girlfriend in 2018.
2024	2 March	Former Raffles Institution headmaster and historian Eugene Wijeysingha, died at age 90.
2024	2 April	Swimmer Joseph Schooling, who won Singapore's first ever Olympic gold medal, retires from swimming at 28.
2024	15 April	Lee Hsien Loong announces his resignation as the 3rd Prime Minister of Singapore effective on 15 May 2024. Deputy Prime Minister and Finance Minister Lawrence Wong will assume the position of the 4th Prime Minister of Singapore.
2024	22 April	A six-car collision at the junction of Tampines Avenue 1 and 4 results in the death of two Malay Singaporeans: 17-year-old Temasek Junior College student and a 57-year-old woman.
2024	15 May	Lawrence Wong is sworn in as the fourth Prime Minister of Singapore, succeeding Lee Hsien Loong.
2024	21 May	Singapore Airlines Flight 321, flying from London to Singapore makes an emergency landing at Bangkok's Suvarnabhumi Airport after experiencing severe air turbulence over the Bay of Bengal, resulting in one death and at least 71 injured.
2024	14 June	An accident involving a Dutch-flagged dredger and a stationary Singapore-flagged bunker vessel occurs at the Pasir Panjang terminal, causing an oil spill that forces the closure of three beaches in Sentosa Island.
