= Liquor Control (Supply and Consumption) Act 2015 =

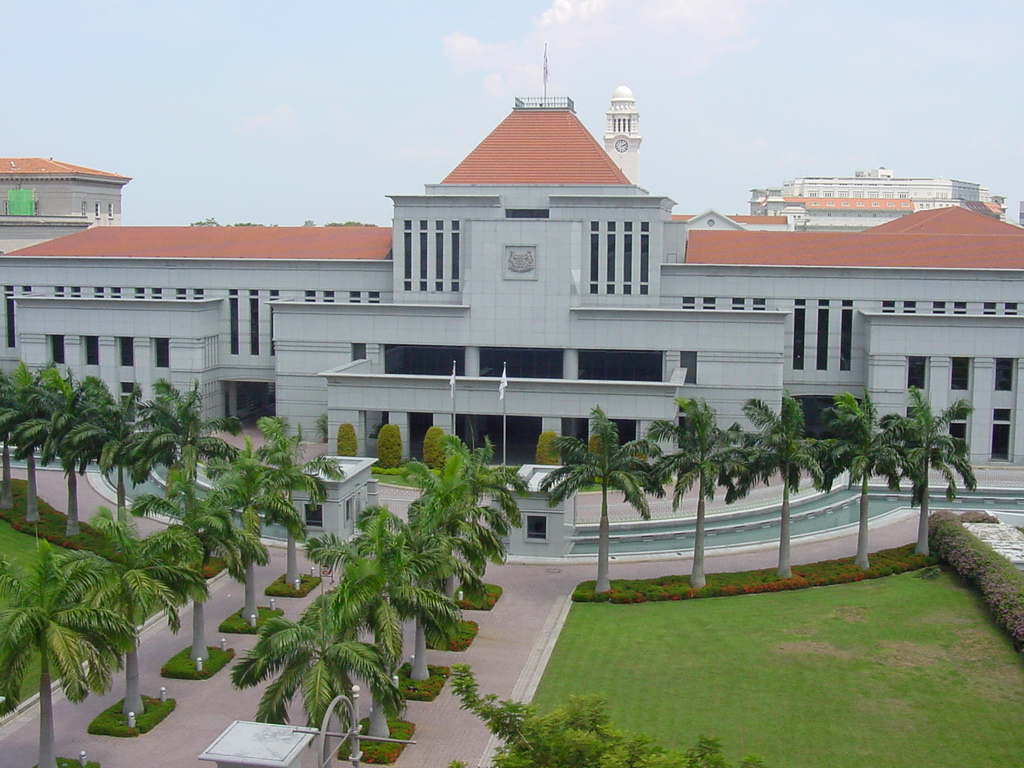

Parliament of Singapore
- Long title: An Act to regulate the supply and consumption of liquor at public places, and to make consequential and related amendments to certain other written laws.
- Enacted by: Parliament of Singapore
- Enacted: 30 January 2015
- Assented to: 6 March 2015
- Commenced: 30 March 2015 & 1 April 2015

Legislative history
- Bill title: Liquor Control (Supply and Consumption) Bill
- Status: In force

The Liquor Control (Supply and Consumption) Act 2015 is a statute of the Parliament of Singapore that regulates the supply and consumption of liquor at public places, and to make consequential and related amendments to certain other written laws. The law is designed specifically to deter recurrences of the 2013 Little India riot that took place with mobs under the influence of alcohol.

== Background ==
In the days after the riot at Little India, then Transport Minister Lui Tuck Yew who was also a Member of Parliament of the district wrote on Facebook that he would consider limiting the sale of liquor within Little India. A temporary ban on the sale and consumption of alcohol in Little India took effect during the weekend of 14–15 December 2013; followed by an extension of the ban for six months until 24 June 2014 which covered mostly parts of the Central Business District. Since May 2014, a total ban of alcohol with closing of night schools and limitation of nightlife areas took effect.

The Liquor Control (Supply and Consumption) Bill was subsequently proposed and assented by the President of Singapore. Liquor licence categorisation is regulated by the new Act as follows:

- Class 1A: Trading Hours 0600hrs to 2359hrs
- Class 1B: Trading Hours 0600hrs to 2200hrs
- Class 2A: Trading Hours 0600hrs to 2359hrs
- Class 2B: Trading Hours as indicated in the licence
- Class 3A: Trading Hours 0700hrs to 2230hrs
- Class 3B: Trading Hours 0700hrs to 2230hrs
- Class 4: Trading Hours 0700hrs to 2230hrs
- Class 5 – Temporary Liquor Licence

Delivery of liquor must also be made in accordance with the trading hours specified in the liquor licence. Offences committed within the liquor control zones (LCZs) will result in a penalty of one and a half times that in non-designated areas.

Violators that are caught drinking may be fined up to S$1,000, while repeat offenders may be fined up to S$2,000 including three months of imprisonment. Retailers that sell alcohol during the curfew hours may be fined up to S$10,000.

== Uses of the Act ==
Within the first two or three months of commencement, around 470 people were issued advisories because they flouted the regulations. Five were arrested, two were given stern warnings, while two retailers were investigated over selling alcohol past 10:30pm.

=== Exemption of food products containing alcohol ===
The Straits Times reported on 20 April 2018 that FairPrice restricted the sale of Udders ice cream with alcohol exceeding 0.5% ice cream after 10:30pm after clarifying the rules with authorities, taking into account consultations with consumers and Udders. This came two days after a Facebook post on the issue showing this sign. In view of feedback from these restrictions, the Ministry of Home Affairs announced on 25 October 2018 that it will review the restrictions on alcoholic ice cream and other such food products with the Ministry of Trade and Industry and other stakeholders as it is unlikely that the consumption of such products will lead to alcohol abuse. After the review was completed, the Ministry of Home Affairs announced on 17 January 2019 that alcoholic ice cream and other such food products can be sold after 10:30 pm following an exemption under the Liquor Control (Supply and Consumption) Act, taking effect from 18 January 2019.
