= Awards and decorations of the Singapore Civil Defence Force =

Orders and decorations conferred to civil defence personnel of the Singapore Civil Defence Force in Singapore, listed by order of precedence:

== Medals ==
- Commendation Medal (Pingat Kepujian)
- Efficiency Medal (Pingat Berkebolehan)
- Singapore Civil Defence Force Long Service and Good Conduct (35 Years) Medal
- Long Service Medal–Civil Defence (Pingat Bakti Setia (Pertahanan Awam))
- Home Team Operational Service Medal (Pingat Perkhidmatan Operasi Home Team)
- Singapore Civil Defence Force Long Service and Good Conduct
- Singapore Civil Defence Force Good Service Medal
- Singapore Civil Defence Force Overseas Service Medal

== Badges and Specialist Tabs ==
=== Skills Badge ===
- Emergency Medical Service Badge
- Fire Badge

=== Marine Navigational Badges ===
- Steersman
- Helmsman
- Bridge Watch-keeping Officer

=== Tabs ===
- DART Tab
- HAZMAT Tab
- Paramedic Level 3 Tab
- Paramedic Level 4 Tab
- EMT Tab
- Marine Tab
- K9 Search Tab
- Fire Investigator Tab
- CBRE Tab

=== IPPT Badges ===
- IPPT Gold Award Badge
- IPPT Silver Award Badge

=== Identification Badge ===
- Paracounsellor Badge
- CDAU Volunteer Badge
- Aide-de-Camp Badge
- SCDF Expert Badge
- INSARAG National Accreditation Badge
- Service Excellence Award (Gold) Badge
- Service Excellence Award (Platinum) Badge
- Guard of Honour Badge

=== Obsolete Badges & Tabs ===
- Physical Training Instructor Badge
- Driving Instructor Badge
- Paramedic Badge
- Medical Orderly Badge
- Rescue Tab
- Medic Tab

A badge known as the Civil Defence Triangle was awarded to servicemen from the then Singapore Joint Civil Defence Forces and Singapore Fire Service. The badge was only awarded for the Hotel New World incident and is classified as an award.
