= List of riots in Singapore =

Riots in Singapore have been documented since its founding as a British colony in 1819 and when it became part of the Straits Settlements in 1826. In the present day, under the Penal Code, rioting refers to the unlawful gathering of five or more people where force or violence is used by any member of the assembly; an affray is committed if two or more people fight in a public place. The list of riots in Singapore below describes the most serious and prominent ones.

== Straits Settlements (United Kingdom) ==
Singapore in the Straits Settlements (1826–1942/1946)

- 15 – 20 February 1851 – Anti-Catholic riots (500 dead)
- 5 – 17 May 1854 – Hokkien-Teochew riots (200 to 480 dead, 222 injured)
- 15 December 1876 – Chinese Post Office Riots (3 dead)
- 12 March 1927 – Kreta Ayer Incident (6 dead, 14 injured)

== Colony of Singapore (United Kingdom) ==
Colony of Singapore (1946–1963)

- 11 December 1950 – Maria Hertogh riots (18 dead, 173 injured)
- 13 May 1954 – 1954 National Service riots (26 injured)
- 12 May 1955 – Hock Lee bus riots (4 dead, 31 injured)
- 26 October 1956 – Chinese middle schools riots (13 dead, more than 100 injured)
- 22 April 1963 – City Hall riot
- 12 July 1963 – Pulau Senang prison riot (4 dead, 5 injured)

== State of Singapore (Malaysia) ==
State of Singapore (1963–1965)

- 21 July and 2 September 1964 – 1964 race riots (36 dead, 560 injured)

== Republic of Singapore ==
Republic of Singapore (1965–present)

- 31 May to 6 June 1969 – 1969 race riots (4 dead, 80 injured)
- 8 December 2013 – 2013 Little India riot (62 injured)
