= 2013 Little India riot =

2013 civil unrest in Singapore

Coordinates: 1°18′30″N 103°51′3″E

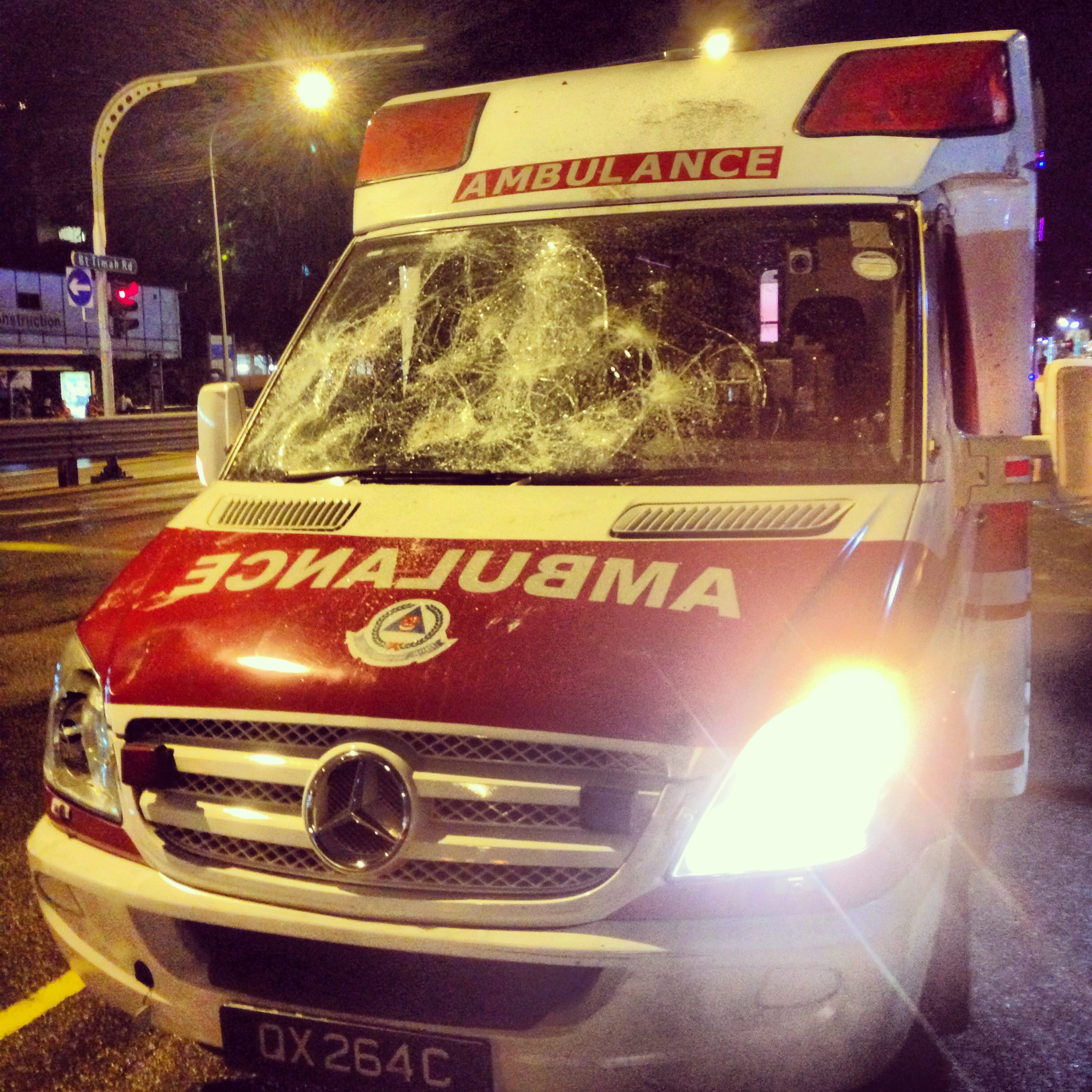
- An ambulance damaged during the riot, photographed on 9 December 2013
- Date: 8 December 2013; 12 years ago
- Location: Road junction of Race Course Road and Tekka Lane
- Caused by: Traffic accident
- Methods: Rioting

Parties
Singapore Police Force; Special Operations Command	300~ rioters

Lead figures
Teo Chee Hean; S. Iswaran; Ng Joo Hee; Hoong Wee Teck	

Casualties
- Injuries: 62
- Arrested: 40
- Charged: 33

The Little India riot took place in the Singaporean subzone of Little India on 8 December 2013 at SST 21:21, after a fatal traffic accident at the road junction of Race Course Road and Tekka Lane caused the death of 33-year-old Indian construction worker Sakthivel Kumaravelu. Angry mobs of migrant workers – largely composed of Indian nationals – attacked the bus involved and emergency vehicles that arrived shortly after. There were around 300 rioters involved in the incident, which lasted for about two hours.

This was the second riot in post-independence Singapore, and the first in 44 years since the 1969 race riots. On 13 December, deputy prime minister Teo Chee Hean launched a Committee of Inquiry (COI) into the incident, which was completed on 27 June 2014. The COI wrote that the main cause of the riot was Kumaravelu's death and was fuelled by misconceptions and intoxication among the rioters. The riot led to stricter laws and higher penalties on alcohol consumption and sales – culminating in the Liquor Control (Supply and Consumption) Act in 2015 – along with increased surveillance and new facilities for migrant workers in Little India.

Twenty-five rioters were sentenced for their involvement, while fifty-three were deported. An additional 200 workers were warned. The riot led to discussion on the treatment and integration of migrant workers in Singapore.

== Background ==
Since its independence in 1965, Singapore only experienced one other riot prior to this incident – the 1969 race riots – which saw four dead and eighty wounded, but is nowadays generally considered safe, with such incidents of violence being described as "rare" in modern times. Singapore is known for frequently utilising migrant workers in sectors such as construction. The subzone of Little India is a common and popular congregation area for South Asian migrant workers hailing from countries such as India, Bangladesh, Pakistan, Sri Lanka, and Nepal.

South Asian workers typically eat, socialise, and run errands in Little India, and usually do so on Sundays, their most common off-day. Transportation between Little India and their dormitories was offered by the Little India Bus Service, which was run by the Land Transport Authority with consultation from Singapore Contractors Association Limited; the buses were provided by the Singapore School Transport Association and the Singapore School & Private Hire Bus Owners’ Association.

== Incident ==
=== Death of Sakthivel Kumaravelu ===
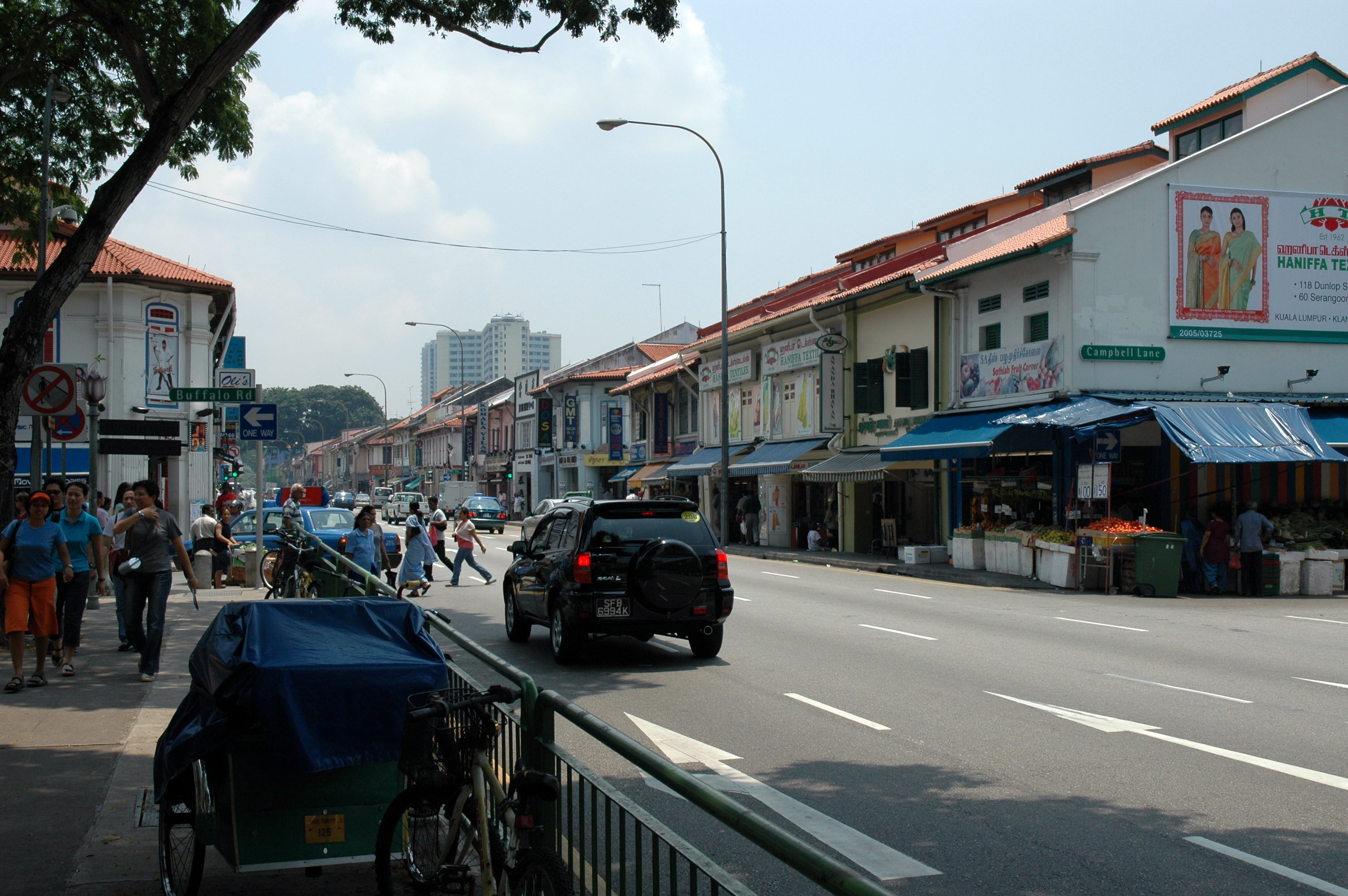
The riot took place in Singapore's Little India (pictured).

On 8 December 2013, a Sunday, 33-year-old construction worker Sakthivel Kumaravelu was in Little India in the evening. He was from the Pudukkottai district of Tamil Nadu and lived in a dormitory in Jalan Papan, Jurong. He had first travelled to Singapore in 2007 to work as a welder, having sought work abroad because of his family's financial hardship. He was employed with the scaffolding company Heng Hup Soon, which he had worked at for two years. Kumaravelu went to board a private bus at Tekka Lane to return to Jalan Papan; the bus was run by the driver, Lee Kim Huat, (Note: Also known by the alias Lim Hai Tiong.) and its timekeeper, Wong Geck Woon. He appeared visibly drunk and skipped the queue to board, prompting complaints by other workers to Wong about Kumaravelu. As they were not allowed to transport drunk passengers, Wong asked a worker to tell him to leave, but Kumaravelu did not listen, and Wong told him to leave after she saw him with his pants down.

He later alighted and three more passengers boarded before the bus drove off, travelling along Tekka Lane towards Race Course Road. Less than a minute later, Kumaravelu was seen following the bus and peering inside from its front door, but Lee waved him off to tell him that the bus was full. Despite this, he continued following after the bus, running to catch it. As Lee turned left onto Race Course Road, he checked his mirror and did not see Kumaravelu, as he was in Lee's blind spot. While Lee made the turn, Kumaravelu had his arm extended against the bus to balance himself, but fell and had his head and torso run over by its left front wheel, killing him immediately at around SST 21:21. Lee exited the bus to check what happened, and workers became agitated at the sight of their fellow worker being run over by the bus. They began attacking the bus, Lee, and Wong, before a worker labelled a "Good Samaritan" in the media helped them back on the bus.

The situation soon escalated with the workers throwing bottles, stones, trashcans, metal drain covers, and shoes at the bus, severely damaging its windows and windscreen; they also punched and kicked at the bus. Wong was struck by a brick near her left eye and she hid by the driver's seat, while Lee sheltered under a trashcan that had been thrown inside. Two workers later climbed inside through a broken window, where one hit Wong repeatedly on her head with a "stick-like object" while demanding to see Lee, but they left the bus after they were unable to find him.

=== Police arrival and escalation ===
The Singapore Police Force (SPF) received their first call at 21:23 for a traffic disruption, with no concerns about violence mentioned. The SPF deployed two traffic police officers from the Rochor Neighbourhood Police Centre (NPC) and an ambulance from the Singapore Civil Defence Force (SCDF). Further reports came from Certis Group officers near the scene – who saw the large group of workers – and called for aid with crowd control from other nearby Certis teams and the Kampong Java NPC. The assistant superintendent of police for Kampong Java NPC Jonathan Tang went to Little India with his partner after the alert.

From 21:31 to 21:38, the first police and emergency vehicles arrived at the scene, with the crowd size swelling to around 100 people. At 21:39, an SCDF Red Rhino arrived, but their officers did not notice Kumaravelu's body and instead checked on Wong. Tang arrived a minute after and ordered the officers to create a human barrier around the bus in order to remove Kumaravelu's body, during which they were being hit by thrown objects. As more officers with helmets and shields arrived, Tang told them to form a barrier to protect the officers who were leaving the bus, along with Wong and Lee. The crowd size increased to around 400 people (though later reports state it was only 300) by 21:45, and the Special Operations Command (SOC) was activated. The Gurkha Contingent also aided in managing the riot.

By 21:56, SCDF rescuers retrieved Kumaravelu's body, where he was pronounced dead by a paramedic. At 22:08, Wong and Lee exited the bus while being surrounded by the officers with shields. Upon this sight, the workers began attacking the group as they saw the two being protected by the officers. Before the arrival of the SOC, from 22:20 to 22:40, the rioters flipped six vehicles and set four on fire. The main areas impacted were the bus site near Race Course Road, Tekka Lane, Kerbau Road, Bukit Timah Road, Hampshire Road, and Northumberland Road. The SOC arrived at 22:50; by then, many rioters surrendered and the crowd had decreased.

=== Quelling of riot ===
By 23:25–23:30, all the rioters had dispersed. Investigations began at 00:01, 9 December, with the police commissioner Ng Joo Hee, police deputy commissioner Hoong Wee Teck, deputy prime minister Teo Chee Hean, and second home affairs minister S. Iswaran arriving shortly after. The investigations completed at 05:08 and the National Environment Agency began cleanup operations. Race Course Road was fully reopened to traffic by 06:45. The riot took one and a half hours to bring under control.

== Aftermath ==
Overall, over 300 officers were dispatched to deal with the rioters. Early estimates put the number of rioters at 400, but it was later reduced to 300 in the aftermath of the riot. Thirty vehicles were damaged during the riot. No deaths were reported, although sixty-two people were injured – thirty-seven police officers, twelve SCDF officers, five Certis officers, and eight civilians. Two explosions were reportedly heard at the scene; these came from an ambulance and police car that were set on fire. Thirty-six of the injured received treatment at Tan Tock Seng Hospital's emergency department. Kumaravelu's body was identified on 9 December at the Singapore General Hospital's mortuary.

=== Reactions ===
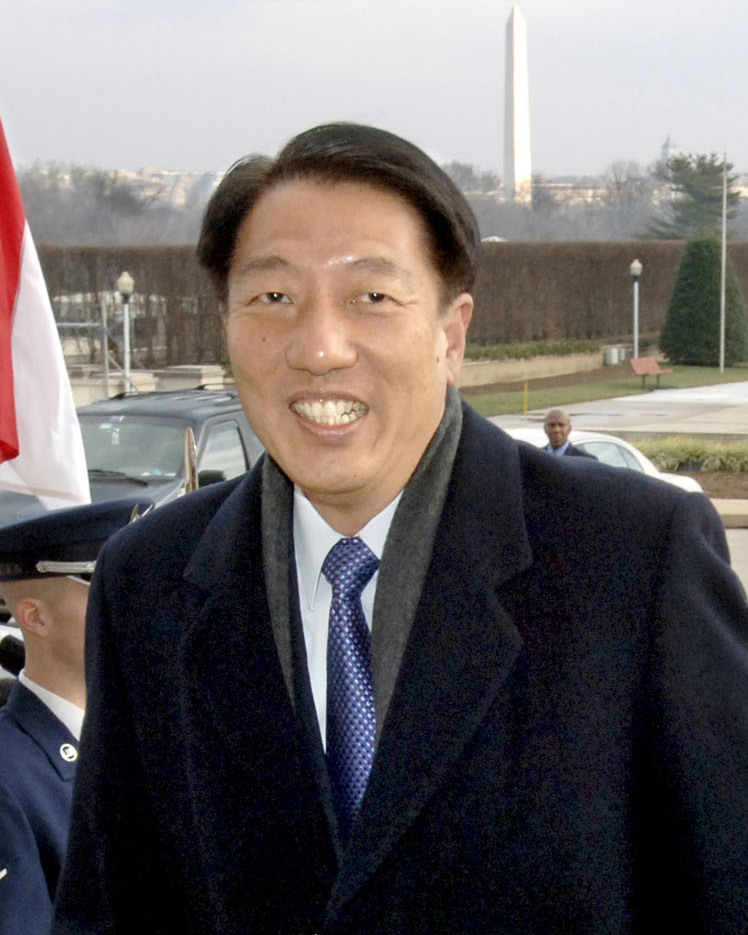
Deputy prime minister Teo Chee Hean (pictured) launched a Committee of Inquiry and stated that "the government will not tolerate such lawless behaviour".

Initial responses came from prime minister Lee Hsien Loong, who stated on Facebook that it was a "grave incident" and that the police would "spare no effort to identify the culprits and deal with them with the full force of the law". Teo stated that "the government will not tolerate such lawless behaviour" and that the riot would be investigated thoroughly. A press conference was held at the Ministry of Home Affairs at 2 a.m. on 9 December, which was chaired by Teo, Iswaran, Ng, and police deputy commissioner T. Raja Kumar. Later, Lee told Singaporeans to refrain from negative comments against migrant workers, and gave his condolences to Kumaravelu's family. Transport minister Lui Tuck Yew, who was also the member of parliament for the Little India area, stated that he would consider limiting the sale of alcohol within Little India.

Bangladesh's high commissioner to Singapore, Mahbub Uz Zaman, stated that "the news reports that appeared on a section of media and news involving a Bangladeshi worker is not based on facts", and called for the co-operation of the Bangladeshi community with the Singapore authorities. This came following early news reports that erroneously stated that the victim of the accident was a Bangladeshi. In India, a news report by India's Sun TV on 9 December 2013 attracted controversy in Singapore for erroneously reporting that Kumaravelu was pushed out of the bus by Wong, as well as attacked by locals. In response to protests from Lim Thuan Kuan, Singapore's high commissioner to India, Sun TV issued a correction the following day and apologised for the error. India's High Commission in Singapore asked for the Indian community to remain calm following the riot. In Tamil Nadu, Kumaravelu's mother appealed to the state government to help the family.

Mainstream media outlets praised and made public appeals to trace a "Good Samaritan" and other bystanders who attempted to stop the riots, which was captured on video and uploaded to YouTube. The "Good Samaritan" in the video footage was initially identified as Indian national Thangaval Govindarasu after he came forward following appeals for the identity of the man. However, he later admitted that he was not the man in the video. A coffee shop owner in Little India later claimed that he recognised the man in the footage as a regular customer from Chennai. However, he declined to divulge the name of the customer, and stated he was unaware of where the man worked.

=== Investigation and charges ===
Initially, twenty-seven rioters were arrested, of which twenty-four were Indian, two were Bangladeshi, and one was a Singaporean permanent resident. The rioters were to be charged for rioting and vandalism. Investigations later revealed that one Indian, the two Bangladeshis, and the Singaporean permanent resident were not involved in the incident. The remaining twenty-four were charged on 10 December.

Lee, the bus driver, was also arrested for causing death by negligence and was released on bail. Later in February 2014, he was acquitted of all charges. The Attorney-General's Chambers stated that Lee was driving at a speed of 5.6–5.9 kilometres per hour (3.5–3.7 mph) and was focusing on manoeuvring around the area, while Kumaravelu had a blood alcohol level of 217 milligrams (3.35 gr) per 100 millilitres (3.5 imp fl oz; 3.4 US fl oz) of blood. Lee stated that he did not see Kumaravelu due to the poor lighting and did not use a device that could have alerted him to nearby objects due to its glare affecting his driving. Therefore, Kumaravelu's death was ruled an accident, as Lee "could not be expected to foresee that the deceased had run after the bus. Nor could the driver have expected that the deceased would fall into the path of the bus."

On 10 December, eight workers originating from India were arrested for their involvement in the riot. The following day, three of them were charged in court, with one of the remaining five having been released on bail. On 12 December, four more workers were charged. On 14 December, two more were charged, bringing the total accused to thirty-three. All were advised by the Law Society of Singapore to apply for their Criminal Legal Aid Scheme if they were unable to acquire counsel. On 10 February 2014, an Indian construction worker was sentenced to 15 weeks imprisonment on charges related to the riot. In June, a man was sentenced to two years' imprisonment for his involvement. On 2 October, a man was sentenced to 25 months imprisonment with three strokes of the cane for flipping a police car.

On 2 December, a construction worker was sentenced to a year of imprisonment for assaulting a police officer during the riot. On 10 February 2015, two more workers were sentenced to 27 and 25 months imprisonment for their involvement in the riots. The last accused for rioting was sentenced on 2 June 2015. In total, twenty-five rioters were sentenced. 53 workers were deported for offences ranging from obstructing the police to failing to follow police orders to disperse, while 200 workers received formal advisories to obey the law.

=== Alcohol ban ===
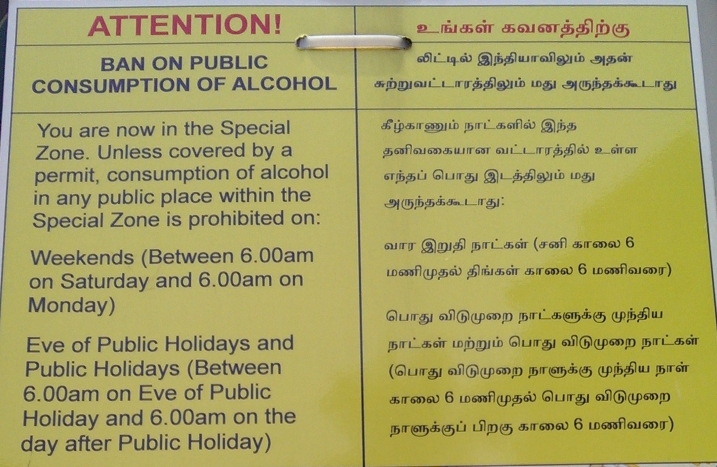
A sign in Little India (pictured in 2014), indicating a ban on alcohol consumption under the Public Order (Preservation) Act.

On 12 December, the SPF banned alcohol sales in Little India for the coming weekend and declared Little India a "proclaimed area" under the Public Order (Preservation) Act, following reports that alcohol consumption may have played a role in the riot. This initial ban over the 14–15 December weekend was later extended for six months until 24 June 2014. Furthermore, a bill was introduced in Parliament that gave officers in the Little India area the authority to strip search individuals and detain them if alcohol or weapons were found on them, although this law was only in action for a year.

During this period, merchants of the Little India Shopkeepers and Heritage Association expressed their difficulties from the alcohol ban with law minister K. Shanmugam. They suggested that the ban should start later in the evening or a designated area be established for workers to consume alcohol, as they were experiencing low sales and foot traffic due to the ban. The riot eventually led to the implementation of a new law in 2015 – the Liquor Control (Supply and Consumption) Act – which banned the consumption of alcohol from 10:30 p.m. to 7 a.m. in all public places. Under the law, Little India was classified as a "Liquor Control Zone" alongside Geylang, which gave to stricter regulations on alcohol consumption in those areas. In 2019, food products containing alcohol were exempted from the act.

== Committee of Inquiry ==
On 13 December, Teo appointed a four-member Committee of Inquiry (COI) to look into and investigate the incident; it was completed on 27 June 2014. It was composed of former judge G. Pannir Selvam, former police commissioner Tee Tua Ba, former NTUC president John De Pavya, and West Coast Citizens’ Consultative Committee chairman Andrew Chua Thiam Chwee. The COI stated that Kumaravelu's death was the primary cause of the riot, which was further fuelled by misconceptions and intoxication amongst the rioters.

Some misunderstandings include that the workers assumed that the first arriving officers were there to arrest Wong and Lee for the accident, but instead saw them being protected. There were further rumours that Kumaravelu did not die instantly and cried for help, that Wong shoved him off the bus, and that officers disrespected Kumaravelu's body by kicking him, but all were found to be false.

The COI also ruled out racial or labour issues as contributing factors. It explained that riots usually occurred when minority groups want to express dissatisfaction at certain issues, but that the Little India riot did not fulfil this criterion, as the rioters were a small amount of all migrant workers, the incident was spontaneous, there was no ethnic discrimination involved, the rioters' actions were not met with support, and police brutality was not involved. However, the COI stated that, despite the fact that labour conditions were not a factor of the riots, living conditions of migrant workers could be improved.

=== Police action ===
The SPF's actions and role during the riot were both praised and critiqued in the COI; they effectively extracted Kumaravelu's body and rescued Wong and Lee, but the SCDF should not have left the area afterwards and instead remained to monitor the situation. During the riot, there was confusion among the officers on who were the highest-ranking and therefore should be deferred to, with additional high-ranking officers later arriving in plainclothes. The officers' radios did not work effectively as there were too many messages being sent from the same area, which resulted in a delay to the SOC's arrival. The SOC also took a slower route as they were unable to be radioed the fastest way there; an unnecessary u-turn was made at Bukit Timah Road, which increased their arrival time by fifteen minutes.

As the SPF assumed that the SOC would arrive quickly, they did not set up a command post or arrest any of the rioters, which may have caused the rioters' actions to grow bolder upon seeing the inaction of the SPF. Some SPF officers argued that it was not possible for them to carry out these measures as they were overwhelmed, but the COI wrote that two officers – Fadli Shaifuddin bin Mohamed Sani and Srisivangkar Subramaniam – separately managed to disperse some groups of rioters without being overwhelmed. During the hearing of the COI, deputy assistant commissioner Lu Yeow Lim was criticised for "[staying] put at a protected place and [doing] nothing", along with not authorising any arrests and his lack of awareness on the number of deployed officers. Lu defended his actions as he planned to wait for the SOC's arrival and that his officers were outnumbered.

The COI examined that, as Singapore modernised, the SPF focused less on militarisation and became more civilised, reducing the need for a large SOC. Due to this, the SOC may have been disadvantaged during the riot. The COI recommended that the SPF's command, communications, and situation control be improved; frontline officers be more properly equipped to handle large-scale disorderly situations; the SPF and SOC's manpower and resources be increased; the SPF and SCDF's abilities to handle large public disorder situations be improved; and that time taken to gain approval or activate resources be reduced during emergency situations.

== Legacy ==
The riot raised debate online by Singaporeans on the issues of overcrowding and increasing number of migrant workers in Singapore. It also highlighted ongoing tensions within Singapore regarding the country's heavy reliance on foreign labour. Similarities were also drawn from the riot to the 2012 bus drivers' strike. Some commented on the treatment of migrant workers, with blogger and activist Roy Ngerng stating that "the inequality that has taken root in Singapore has dire consequences and they are beginning to show." Migrant labour activist Jolovan Wham said it was unclear if "pent-up rage" was a symptom of the riot. Jeremy Grant of the Financial Times described the riot as having revealed the disharmony amongst Singapore's multiple races, but the COI disproved Grant's article for implying that racial issues were the cause of the riot. The Singaporean authorities called for calm and warned against speculation.

Analysing the riot, Nanyang Technological University assistant sociology professor Premchand Varma stated that Singaporeans do not interact heavily with migrant workers and that they are not largely considered a part of Singaporean society, while the National University of Singapore's (NUS) sociologist Paulin Straughan attributed this to a lack of daily interaction with migrant workers. Eugene Tan of the Singapore Management University (SMU) agreed with Straughan and questioned the "gated communities" dividing migrant workers and Singaporeans. Non-government organisations focusing on migrants' issues such as the Migrant Workers' Centre and the Humanitarian Organization for Migration Economics reported increased interest in their work after the riot.

In August 2014, 180 officers involved in the incident received the Pingat Perkhidmatan Operasi Home Team, which was instituted that same year and recognised officers who "responded to deal with major incidents". Later in November, a Facebook post by national development minister Khaw Boon Wan showcasing officers participating in an anti-riot drill drew controversy, as it used South Asian workers from a dormitory in Woodlands to represent the rioters. Many Singaporeans online commented on the racial undertones of the exercise, with Tan of SMU stating that "it reinforces certain stereotypes". NUS's sociologist Tan Ern Ser described the situation as unavoidable and encouraged building understanding with migrant workers. Khaw clarified that the drill was done to create awareness and was a typical exercise.

In December 2014, reflecting on the riot a year later, Lee said that he had moved on from the incident after suffering from depression for two months. He returned to driving buses, but ferried international school students more frequently than migrant workers. Wong had left her timekeeping job and worked at a flea market selling children's clothes. She remained mentally scarred from the incident. In 2023, she was reported to be working as a school bus attendant, and she visited Little India in August 2023 for the first time since 2013. Little India's surveillance increased from 34 cameras in 2016 to 200 in 2020, with senior parliamentary secretary for home affairs Amrin Amin stating that the increased surveillance was to aid in crime management in the area. In a 2023 article by The Straits Times, some residents reported that Little India has since become safer and cleaner, with the alcohol ban contributing to these factors. Two new bus terminals for migrant workers were also built in Little India at Hampshire Road and Tekka Lane, respectively; prior to their construction, workers usually waited in open fields.

== See also ==
- List of riots in Singapore
