= Pingat Perkhidmatan Operasi Home Team =

- Medal Box Set and Ribbon
- Type: Medal
- Awarded for: Home Team officers who participated at the frontline of significant local operations.
- Presented by: Ministry of Home Affairs
- Eligibility: Civilian and uniformed officers of all Home Team agencies.
- Status: Currently Awarded
- Established: 2014

The Pingat Perkhidmatan Operasi Home Team (Home Team Operational Service Medal), was instituted in 2014. It was first introduced and awarded to 180 officers from the Singapore Police Force and Singapore Civil Defence Force who were involved in the Little India riot.

A clasp is inscribed with the name and year of the incident/operation in respect of which that clasp is awarded. The current list of incidents are:

- 2013 Little India Riot.

== Description ==
- The centre of the ribbon has a red base with a dark blue stripe across. A thin white stripe flanks the three sections.
- A maximum of three barsmay be worn per medal.
