= Udders (ice cream) =

Singapore-based ice cream parlour franchise

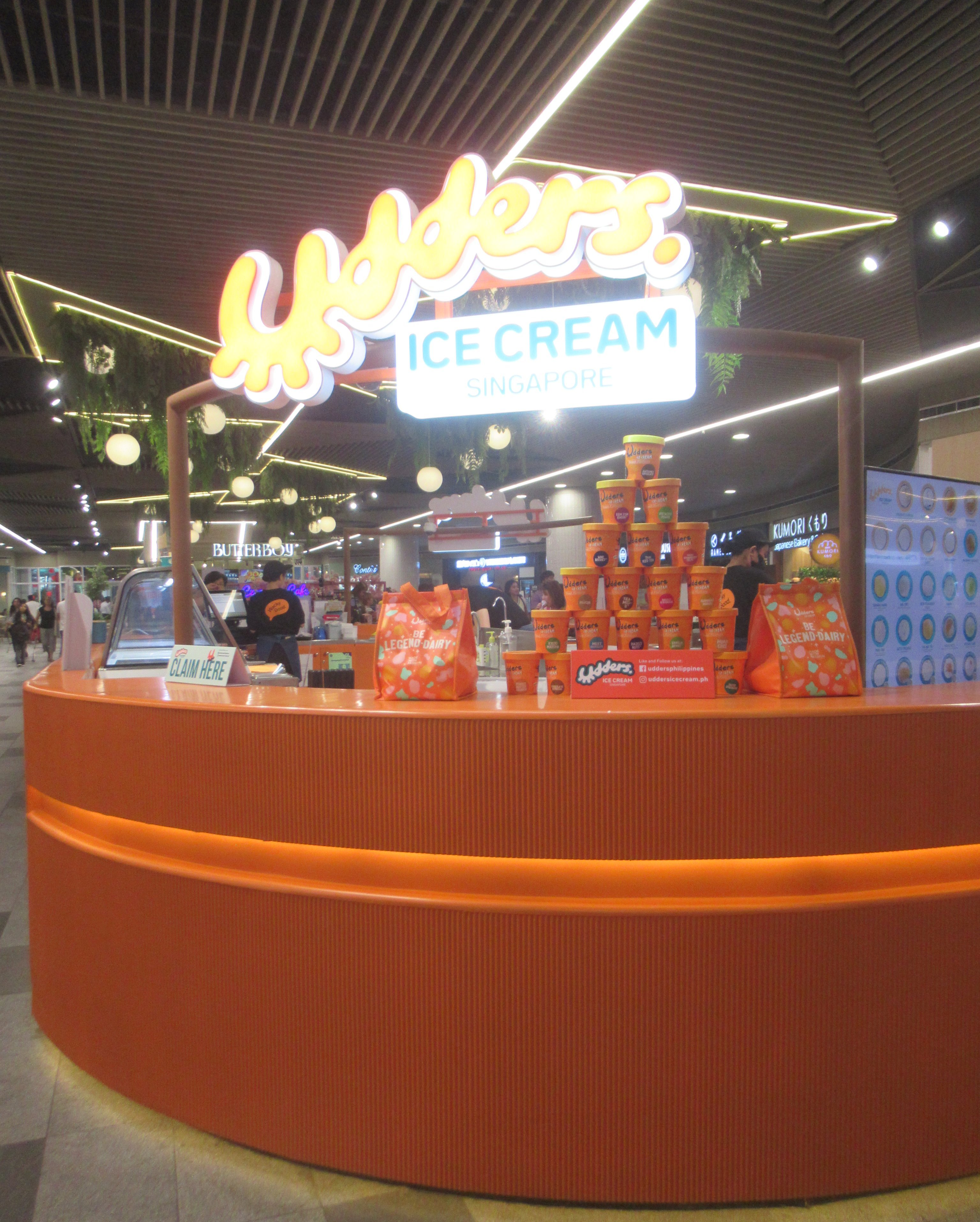
An Udders Ice Cream stall in the Philippines

Udders is a Singapore-based ice cream parlour franchise, established in 2007. It is owned by David Yim.

== History ==
David Lin and his wife Peck established Udders in 2007 and opened the first store at United Square.

== Services ==
The company organizes ice-cream making workshops and provides ice-cream catering services.

== Operations ==
The business has expanded to 400 locations across Southeast Asia. As of February 2022, Udders has six outlets in Singapore.
