= 1969 race riots of Singapore =

The 1969 race riots of Singapore were communal disturbances and racial conflicts between the Malay and Chinese communities in Singapore. It lasted for seven days from 31 May to 6 June 1969. Four people were killed and 80 were injured.

== Background ==
=== Racial violence in Malaysia ===
The origins of the 1969 race riots in Singapore can be traced to the 13 May incident in Kuala Lumpur and Petaling Jaya, Malaysia, earlier that month. The violence was sparked by the results of the 1969 Malaysian general election, in which the Alliance Party suffered major losses. The unrest, marked by large-scale clashes between the Malays and Chinese, was unprecedented in Malaysian history. Hundreds were killed and many more injured. Actual casualty figures were believed to be far higher than the official count, which was never fully disclosed. In response to that incident, the Government of Malaysia had declared a state of emergency and suspended Parliament, placing the country under the National Operations Council (NOC) until 1971.

=== Reaction in Singapore ===
The disturbances were unrelated to Singapore, which had already been a sovereign state separate from Malaysia since 1965. However, due to shared cultural ties, lingering memories of the former merger and close family connections between the two nations, the communal violence in Malaysia inevitably had spillover effects in Singapore. Domestic racial tensions also remained high, as the riots occurred only a few years after the earlier communal riots of 1964 in Singapore.

The racial disturbances of 1964 had played a significant role in the eventual separation of Singapore from Malaysia on 9 August 1965. The campaign by the United Malays National Organisation (UMNO) to promote Malay supremacy (known as Ketuanan Melayu) in Singapore contributed to rising mistrust between the Malay and Chinese communities. In Malaysia, the official government account attributed the 13 May incident to "Malay dissatisfaction with their social and economic position" and concerns that Bumiputera ownership and privileges were being eroded. However, some academics have disputed this, arguing that other political factors contributed to the incident, including claims that the riots were politically convenient for Malay extremists and were deliberately provoked to advance their agenda.

== Riots ==
Reserve Unit Policemen lined the width of Bras Basah Road to reinforce the policemen nearby

News of the 13 May incident began circulating in Singapore about how the Malays in Malaysia had committed atrocities against the Chinese. There was also growing anger over rumours that the Malaysian Armed Forces (MAF) were biased in their response, with reports that Chinese suspects were being punished harshly and arbitrarily. These accounts fuelled resentment among Singapore's Chinese majority and heightened communal tension. In retaliation, some extremists began harassing and assaulting local Malays.

=== Response ===
The Singaporean government, led by Lee Kuan Yew and the People's Action Party (PAP), sought to ensure that such communal tensions would not take root in post-independence Singapore and responded with firm action and imprisonment against extremists and rioters. The Internal Security Department (ISD), working alongside the Singapore Police Force (SPF), moved swiftly to contain the unrest. Security operations and sweeps were conducted across the island by the police and armed forces, with hundreds detained. Order was restored within a short time with a rapid return to normalcy.

== Aftermath and legacy ==
After 1971, once stability was restored, the Malaysian government implemented an affirmative action policy known as the New Economic Policy (NEP), which aimed to "improve the economic position" of the Malays. However, concerns over potential communal tensions have persisted, as political and social divisions among ethnic groups continue to shape Malaysia's landscape.

In April 1987, four silat practitioners were arrested by Singapore's ISD for spreading rumours of imminent racial clashes expected to occur around 13 May 1987, the 18th anniversary of the 1969 racial riots in both Singapore and Malaysia.

== See also ==
- List of riots in Singapore
