= Chinese middle school student riots =

1956 civil unrest in Singapore

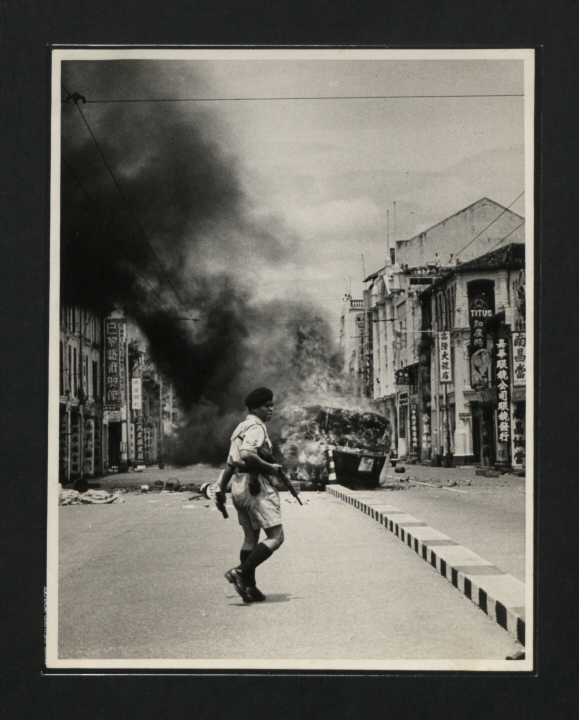
- Communist front inspired riots, Singapore, October 1956
- Also known as: Singapore Chinese Middle School Students Union (SCMSSU) riots
- Outcome: 13 people dead more than 120 injured

The Chinese middle school student riots were a series of riots in Singapore that broke out between the Chinese community in 1956, resulting in 13 people killed and more than 120 injured.

== Overview ==
In 1956, after Lim Yew Hock replaced David Marshall as Chief Minister of Singapore, he began to take tough measures to suppress communist activities with the support of the British Governor and Commissioner of Police.

In September, Lim deregistered and banned three organizations supposedly pro-communist: the Singapore Women’s Association (SWA) and the Chinese Musical Gong Society. The Singapore Chinese Middle School Students Union (SCMSSU) was also dissolved.

The riots came about when Lim announced that the Singapore Chinese Middle School Students' Union would be closed due to its communist activities. The government also arrested four student leaders and expelled 142 students and 2 teachers.

In protest, students gathered and camped at Chung Cheng High School and The Chinese High School. They sat-in over the next two weeks, organizing meetings and holding demonstrations. On 24 October, the government issued an ultimatum that the schools be vacated by 8pm the following evening. As the deadline approached, riots started at the Chung Cheng High School and spread to other parts of the island.

On 26 October, the government decided to take action. The police entered the schools and cleared the students using tear gas. Forced out from the schools, the students headed for the city. They overturned cars and damaged traffic lights, and also threw stones and bottles. Over the next five days, 13 people were killed and more than 100 were injured.

== See also ==
- List of riots in Singapore
