= Clarence Tan =

Singaporean former military officer

- Born: 1941 (age 84–85); Singapore
- Allegiance: Singapore
- Branch: Singapore Army
- Service years: 1960–1992
- Rank: Lieutenant-Colonel
- Commands: Commanding Officer, 4th Battalion, Singapore Infantry Regiment; Commanding Officer, 1st Commando Battalion; Commandant, 1st Commando Battalion

Clarence Tan Kim Peng is a Singaporean former lieutenant-colonel best known for contributing to the creation of the Commandos formation of the Singapore Armed Forces (SAF) in its infancy and early years.

== Career ==
Tan began his military career as a volunteer in the Singapore Military Force (now the Singapore Armed Forces) in 1960. He was commissioned as a second lieutenant after completing the Officer Cadet Course in the Federation Military College in Malaysia, after which he served as a platoon commander in the Singapore Infantry Regiment (SIR)'s 1st Battalion. During the Konfrontasi (1963–1966), Tan was posted to various units, including the Malaysian Special Operations Force, and performed frontline duties in Sabah and Taiping in Malaysia. In June 1967, Tan and Chan Seck Sung attended the ranger and airborne courses conducted by the US Army in Fort Benning, United States. He was promoted to the rank of captain during this period of time.

In 1967, Tan was tasked with recruiting eligible candidates for the Singapore Armed Forces Regular Battalion, the precursor of the 1st Commando Battalion. He was promoted to major in April 1969 and was appointed as the commanding officer (CO) of the SIR's 4th Battalion a year later. He was reassigned to be the CO of the Singapore Armed Forces Regular Battalion again in January 1971 and remained in this position until the unit was renamed "1st Commando Battalion" in June 1978. He was promoted to lieutenant-colonel during this period of time. Later, Tan was transferred from the 1st Commando Battalion to the 5th Singapore Infantry Brigade, but he returned to serve as the commandant of the newly established Singapore Armed Forces Commando Formation in 1981. He held this appointment until 1988 and served as a defence attaché in Australia before retiring in 1992.

== Bibliography ==
- Squire, Thomas A. (2018). Always a Commando : the life of Singapore army pioneer Clarence Tan. Marshall Cavendish Editions. ISBN 978-9814779319.
