= Singapore cable car crash =

1983 fatal accident

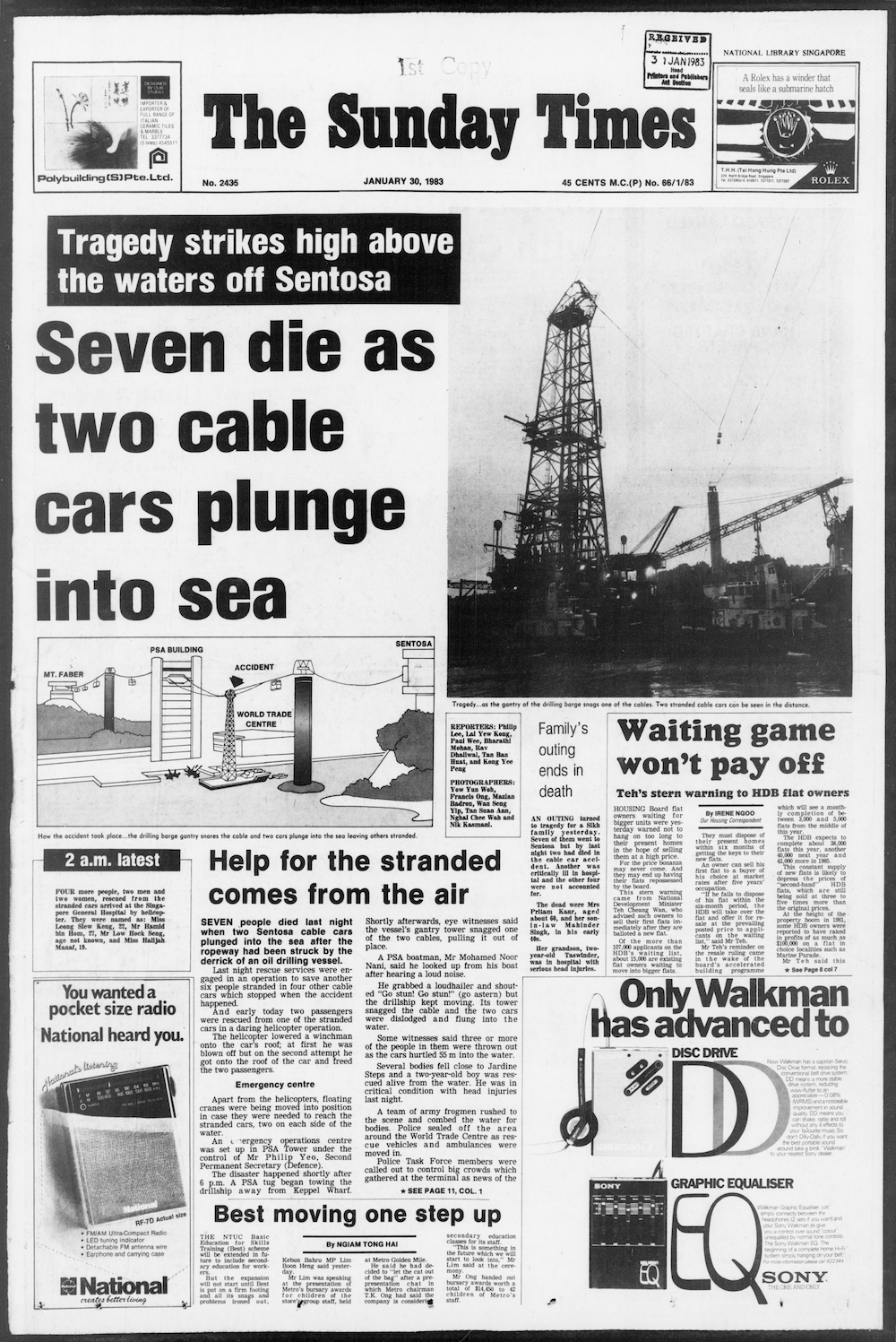
- The Sunday Times front page the day after the incident
- Date: January 29, 1983; 43 years ago
- Time: About 6 pm
- Location: Between the Jardine Steps Station and the Sentosa Station, Singapore.
- Cause: Oil rig (derrick) collision.
- Deaths: 7

At about 6 p.m. on 29 January 1983, the derrick of the Eniwetok, a Panamanian-registered oil rig, passed under the aerial ropeway of the Singapore Cable Car system and struck the cable that stretched over the waterway between the Jardine Steps Station and the Sentosa Station. As a result, two cabins plunged 55 metres (180 ft) into the sea, killing seven people. The oil rig was being towed away from Keppel Wharf when it became entangled in the cable and caused it to snap. It also left thirteen people trapped in four other cabins between Mount Faber and Sentosa. The disaster was the first involving death or injury since the cable car system opened in February 1975.

== Rescue operations ==
The Singapore Police Force, the Singapore Fire Service (now Singapore Civil Defence Force) and all three services of the Singapore Armed Forces (SAF) were involved in the all-night rescue operation. It was headed by Philip Yeo, then Second Permanent Secretary (Defence). The overall operation was directed by Colonel Lee Hsien Loong, later the Prime Minister of Singapore.

There were fears that the oil rig could drift further and cause more damage. The problem was worsened by a combination of strong currents and the rising tide (high tide was at 11 pm). To prevent the rig from moving, four tugs put lines aboard and worked to and fro in the water to keep the rig steady in the water.

The Naval Diving Unit of the Republic of Singapore Navy was assigned to conduct the underwater search for the passengers in the two cabins which had plunged into the sea. It took the unit three hours before they recovered four bodies from the cabins.

On land, the Army established an operations headquarters and medical facilities at the wharf-side.

In the air, 120 Squadron of the Republic of Singapore Air Force was tasked to rescue the people who were still trapped in the four cabins, as the cabins could not be moved along the remaining cables. Though an extremely risky measure, it was considered the fastest and safest way as the cabins might have plunged into the sea at any moment.

The first Bell 212 Twin-Huey Search and rescue helicopter from the squadron (call sign Rescue One Zero) was piloted by Lieutenant Kao Yit Chee, fitted with floodlights, approached the first stranded cabin and despite the strong winds and danger, the winch operator – Staff Sergeant Ramasamy Veerappan winched down the winchman – Lance Corporal Phua Kim Hai. He was blown off on the first attempt but on the second attempt, he reached the door of the cabin, unlocked it and went inside. He came out with the first passenger strapped to his body by a harness. The winch operator pulled both of them to safety.

The riskiest rescues were undertaken by Royal Australian Navy Lieutenant Geoff Ledger, who was on loan to RSAF to help train helicopter pilots. Despite the windy condition encountered above the harbour and the strong downwash of the rescue helicopter's main rotors, he managed to pilot the second Bell 212 rescue helicopter close above the cars to allow winchman Lance Corporal Selvanathan Selvarajoo to enter two cabins hanging only by their towline. Overall, the entire rescue mission took three and a half hours in darkness and high wind conditions.

== Aftermath ==
A Commission of Inquiry was appointed by the President on 5 February 1983 into the disaster. The Commission conducted the Inquiry in public for 55 days from 23 May to 12 August 1983 and submitted its report on 30 December 1983. The report blamed the collision on the negligence of several parties, including the master, chief officer, and pilot of the Eniwetok. The Port of Singapore Authority, the shipyard and the oil rig's operators were also cited. The commission made recommendations for appropriate safety measures to be taken to prevent a similar occurrence in the future.

== See also ==
- Cable car accidents and disasters by death toll
