= Naval Diving Unit (Singapore) =

Maritime special forces unit

- Active: 12 December 1971 – present
- Country: Singapore
- Branch: Republic of Singapore Navy
- Type: Special forces
- Role: Special operations; Direct action; Explosive ordnance disposal; Underwater demolition; Hostage rescue; Counter-terrorism
- Size: 6 squadrons
- Part of: Special Operations Task Force
- Garrison/HQ: Sembawang Camp
- Nicknames: "Warriors of the Deep", "Frogmen", "Frogmen from the Sea"
- Motto: "Nothing Stands In Our Way"
- Engagements: See list: 2004 Indian Ocean earthquake and tsunami; Iraq War; War in Afghanistan; Reconstruction of Iraq; Counter-piracy in the Gulf of Aden

Commanders
- Commander NDU: COL Francis Goh
- Master Chief NDU: SWO David Ling

The Naval Diving Unit (NDU), also referred to as the Naval Divers, is the special forces formation of the Republic of Singapore Navy (RSN) responsible for conducting special operations from sea, air, and land. The formation is made up of six squadrons, specialising in explosive ordnance disposal, underwater demolition, maritime security operations, and combatant craft operations.

== History ==
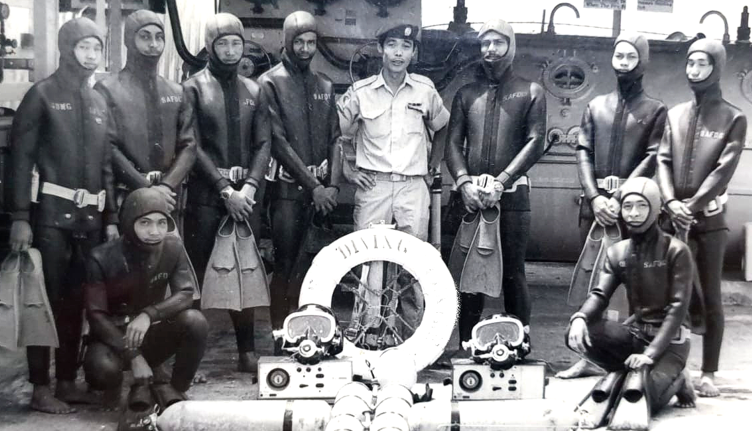
The first generation divers of the NDU.

In 1959, the British Far East Fleet Clearance Diving Team (FECDT) established a base of operations at HMS Terror Camp, which is the current headquarters of the unit. When the Royal Navy left Singapore on 12 December 1971, the Singapore Armed Forces Diving Centre under the command of Major Robert Khoo was tasked by then Minister for Defence Goh Keng Swee to replace the FECDT. The center comprised a group of ten divers who successfully graduates out of 14 trainees Whoo took the course was selected from 200 volunteers drawn from the ranks of the Singapore Maritime Command, the precursor to the Republic of Singapore Navy (RSN). The divers were trained by Lieutenant Victor Rodrigues and were tasked with the maintenance of the Command's naval assets. The SAF Diving Centre became officially known as the Naval Diving Unit (NDU) in 1975.

The unit's first major deployment was during the 1983 Singapore cable car crash, where it retrieved the bodies of four drowned victims. In 1988, with the RSN's rapid growing number of naval assets and an expanding scope of responsibilities, NDU took in its first batch of conscripts to meet its increased manpower requirements. In 1989 They graduated as batch 001 UTD (Underwater Demolition Team) , Colonel Lau Bock Thiam, then Commander NDU, was tasked with developing NDU's maritime special operations capabilities, which led to the creation of the Special Warfare Group (SWG). Naval divers were involved in the salvage operations following the 1991 SilkAir Flight MI185 crash, and in humanitarian efforts during the 2004 Indian Ocean earthquake and tsunami.

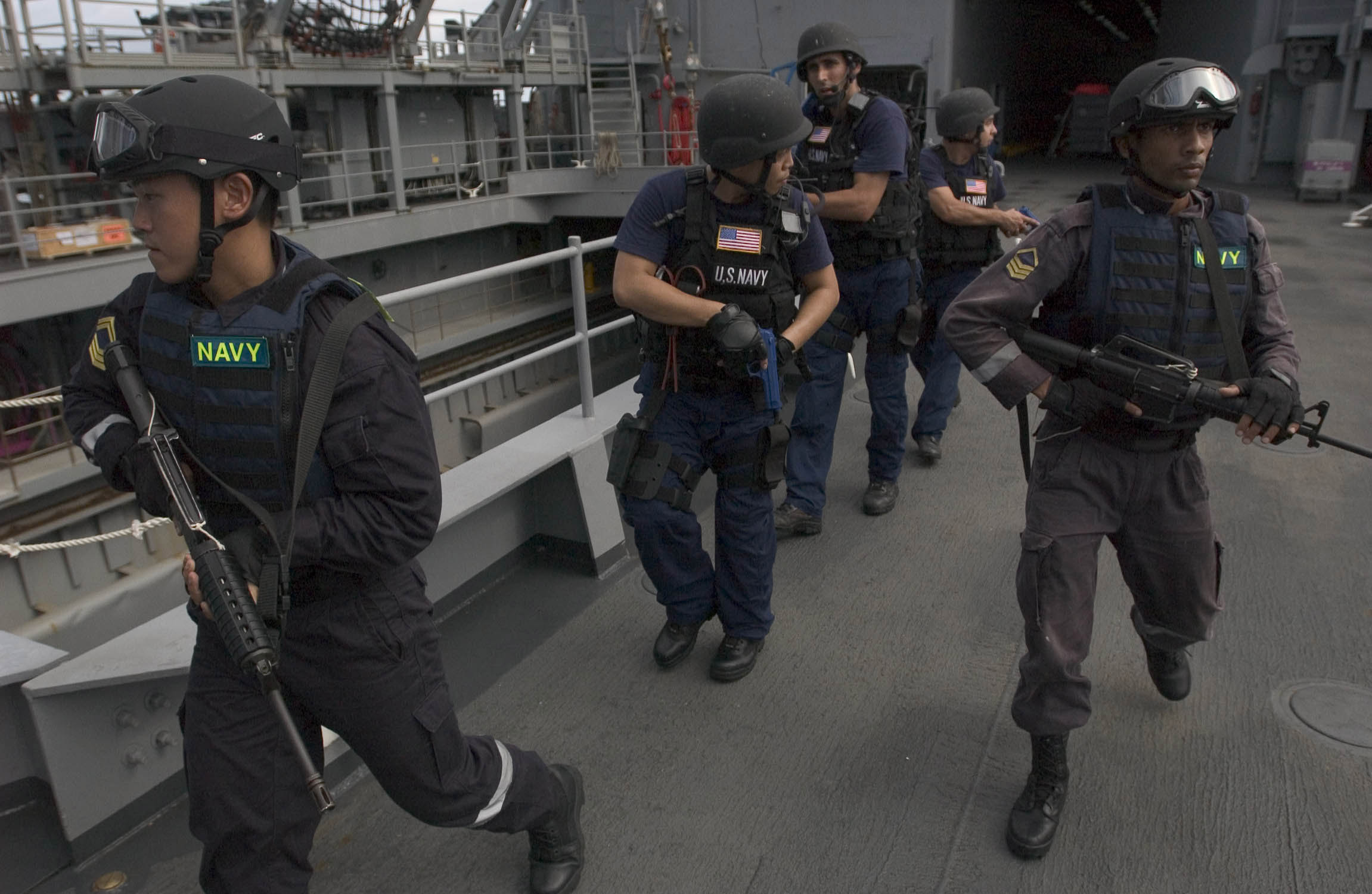
NDU divers in a simulated VBSS operation.

It was a contributor in the multi-national reconstruction efforts in Iraq from 2003 to 2008. Naval divers were also deployed in an operation to search and recover five drowned bodies belonging to members of Singapore's national dragon boating team following a dragon boating incident in Cambodia in 2007.

In 2021, 180 Squadron and Special Operations Boat Task Group were incorporated into the formation. The NDU also celebrated its 50th anniversary.

In December 2022, the NDU announced that Captain (Dr) Chiew Wenqi is the first female navy sailor to be recruited after passing selection.

== Selection and training ==
In NDU, Full-time National Servicemen (NSFs) and regulars are expected to undergo the same training before they are qualified to become part of the unit.

Recruitment begins with a vocational assessment, whereby NSFs are selected among the thousands that enlist each year. During the primary stage of selection, physical fitness results and medical records are evaluated. Thereafter, an aptitude test is conducted by Applied Behavioural Sciences Department (ABSD) to assess the recruit.

Medical fitness criteria such as a physical employment standard (PES) of A or B1, good eyesight and hearing, and the absence of chronic illnesses that may impede their training will have to be met before potential entrants undergo a battery of further tests that include a swimming and hyperbaric chamber test, as well as another round of psychological evaluation. Those who meet the requirements will then be enlisted into the unit.

=== Basic Military Training ===
Enlistees into the unit will undergo a 9-week long Basic Military Training (BMT) and 22-week long Combat Diver Course (CDC) in Frogman School (FmS), the unit's training branch. In BMT, the recruits experience a modified training programme at Sembawang Camp instead of the Basic Military Training Centre (BMTC) like most enlistees, where they will undergo additional swimming and water survival training. The recruits who meet a satisfactory standard here will qualify for the CDC, or are otherwise posted to other vocations within the Navy.

=== Combat Diver Course ===
The Combat Diver Course (CDC) is known to be demanding. It is conducted in three phases, namely the Foundational, Specialisation, and Advanced phases.

In the Foundational phase, the trainees are introduced to land navigation, outboard motor boat handling, and various underwater confidence tests such as drownproofing and underwater knot-tying. They are introduced to the Sea Circuit, an obstacle course which involves a fin swim, rope climb from the water, run, a confidence jump back into the water, swim, and run, covering 750 metres per round, where three rounds must be completed within 18 minutes. In addition, trainees must achieve 95 points for their Individual Physical Proficiency Test (IPPT), run 6 km in 27 minutes, and swim 2 km in their wetsuits, fins, and a floatation device within 50 minutes, before qualifying for Hell Week at the last week of the phase.

In Hell Week, trainees are subject to sleep deprivation, ice-cold baths, and stressed by machine-gun fire, non-stop physical exertion, team-based competitions, and seemingly nonsensical tasks which are meant to simulate the drawn-out chaos and discord of a wartime situation.

The trainees who clear Hell Week proceed on to the Specialisation phase, where trainees are trained in scuba diving, underwater search and salvage capabilities, as well as land and underwater demolitions.

In the Advanced phase, where trainees learn closed-circuit rebreather diving and shipboard competencies. By the end of the course, around half to three-quarters of the initial intake are expected to have dropped out. Those who graduate as divers are assigned to Clearance Diving Group (CDG). Conscripts are prospectively chosen to be specialists or officers by the end of the course, and will undergo the 8-week Dive Leader Course or the 9-month Midshipman Officer Cadet Course at the Officer Cadet School (OCS) respectively.

=== Special Warfare Advanced Training ===
To qualify as an operator in the Special Warfare Group (SWG), naval divers have to pass the four-month Special Warfare Advanced Training (SWAT). In this course, divers are trained in highly specialised advanced diving techniques to operate effectively in the SWG.

== Organisation ==
The formation consists of six squadrons which specialise in differing capabilities.

- Special Warfare Group (SWG)
- Special Boat Group (SBG)
- Clearance Diving Group (CDG)
- Underwater Demolition Group (UDG)
- 180 Squadron
- Frogman School (FmS)

=== Special Boat Group ===
Special Boat Group raises, trains and sustains all maritime craft, including the Combatant Craft Large and Combatant Craft Medium which support maritime counter-terrorism operations.

=== Clearance Diving Group ===
The Clearance Diving Group, composed of regular servicemen and Full-time National Servicemen (NSFs), is tasked with helping to preserve the safety of Singapore's vital sea lines of communication, and specialises in improvised explosive device disruption, underwater mine disposal, and explosive ordnance disposal. The group works alongside mine countermeasures vessels and is an integral part of the Naval Explosive Ordnance Disposal Unit. The group is also tasked with underwater security sweeps to ensure that key installations and naval assets are protected from underwater sabotage. The Navy guard-of-honour contingents during the annual SAF Day Parade and National Day Parade are almost exclusively made up of divers from the Clearance Diving Group.

=== Underwater Demolition Group ===
The Underwater Demolition Group, composed only of Operationally Ready National Servicemen (NSmen), is tasked with the demolition of natural maritime barriers, as well as wartime sabotage operations on enemy maritime infrastructure.

=== 180 Squadron ===
The 180 Squadron comprises the Accompanying Sea Security Teams, which conducts compliant ship boarding checks on merchant ships to ensure the safety and security of Singapore's waters.

=== Frogman School ===
The Frogman School is the training institute responsible for developing the maritime special operations capabilities for the Singapore Armed Forces (SAF). It conducts the Basic Military Training, Combat Diver Course, Dive Leader Course, Diver Supervisor Course, ASSET Qualification Course, Special Warfare Advanced Training, and Basic Diving Course.

== Equipment ==
=== Diving gear ===
1. Aqualung Full Range Oxygen Gas System (FROGS)—allows a diver to stay underwater for extended periods of time. A soda lime canister absorbs exhaled carbon dioxide, and the consumed gas is replaced with oxygen from an attached tank. The diver breathes through a mouthpiece connected to the hose and there are no visible bubbles when the diver exhales.
2. Clearance Divers Life Support Equipment (CDLSE)—a mine countermeasure rebreather with a minimal magnetic signature which allows for mine disposal operations to a depth of 100m.

=== Weapons ===
Pistols
Model	Origin	Caliber	Version	Notes
SIG Sauer P226	Germany	9×19mm Parabellum	P226 E2	
Heckler & Koch P30	Germany	9×19mm Parabellum	P30L	
Glock 17	Austria	9×19mm Parabellum	Glock 17 Gen 3	
FN Five-seven	Belgium	FN 5.7×28mm	Mark 1	
Sub-machine guns
H&K MP7	Germany	HK 4.6×30mm	MP7A1	
H&K MP5	Germany	9×19mm Parabellum	MP5A3, MP5SD3, MP5K-N, MP5K-PDW	
Beretta PMX	Italy	9×19mm Parabellum		
Assault rifles
H&K HK416	Germany	5.56×45mm NATO	D10RS D14.5RS	
M4 carbine	United States	5.56×45mm NATO	M4A1 SOPMOD Block 1	
CAR-15	United States	5.56×45mm NATO	Colt Model 653, Colt Model 723	
SAR-21	Singapore	5.56×45mm NATO	SAR21, SAR21 MMS	
Sniper rifles
H&K HK417	Germany	7.62×51mm NATO	HK417 16″	
M110 SASS	United States	7.62×51mm NATO		
Machine guns
Ultimax 100	Singapore	5.56×45mm NATO	Mark 3	
FN MAG	Belgium	7.62×51mm NATO		
STK 50MG	Singapore	12.7×99mm NATO		
Shotguns
Remington 870	United States		870 MCS	
Grenade launchers
M320 GLM	Germany	40 mm grenade		
M203	United States	40 mm grenade		
Milkor MGL	South Africa	40 mm grenade		
STK 40AGL	Singapore	40 mm grenade		

== In popular culture ==
The first publicly screened production involving the unit was the 1990 Channel 8 drama series titled Navy.

The unit was also the subject of the 2015 Jack Neo film Ah Boys to Men 3: Frogmen which grossed S$7.8 million in the box office. It was filmed on location at the NDU headquarters in Sembawang Camp and some of the trainees and instructors participated in minor roles and as technical consultants.
