= Commandos (Singapore Army) =

- Logo of the Commandos Formation
- Active: 1 December 1969 – present
- Country: Singapore
- Branch: Singapore Army
- Type: Special forces
- Role: Special operations; Airborne assault; Direct action; Special reconnaissance; Counter-terrorism
- Size: 1 battalion
- Part of: Special Operations Task Force
- Garrison/HQ: Pasir Ris Camp; Hendon Camp
- Mottos: "For Honour and Glory"
- Colors: Maroon beret
- Engagements: Operation Thunderbolt; Operation Blue Ridge
- Website: Official website

Commanders
- Chief Commando Officer: BG Alvin Tjioe

Commandos is the special forces formation of the Singapore Army responsible for conducting special operations. Commandos are tasked with infiltrating behind enemy lines by raiding and reconnaissance operations using airborne raids, helicopter assault and sea landings. The formation is made up of only one battalion, the 1st Commando Battalion (1 CDO BN), and is based in Hendon Camp.

== History ==
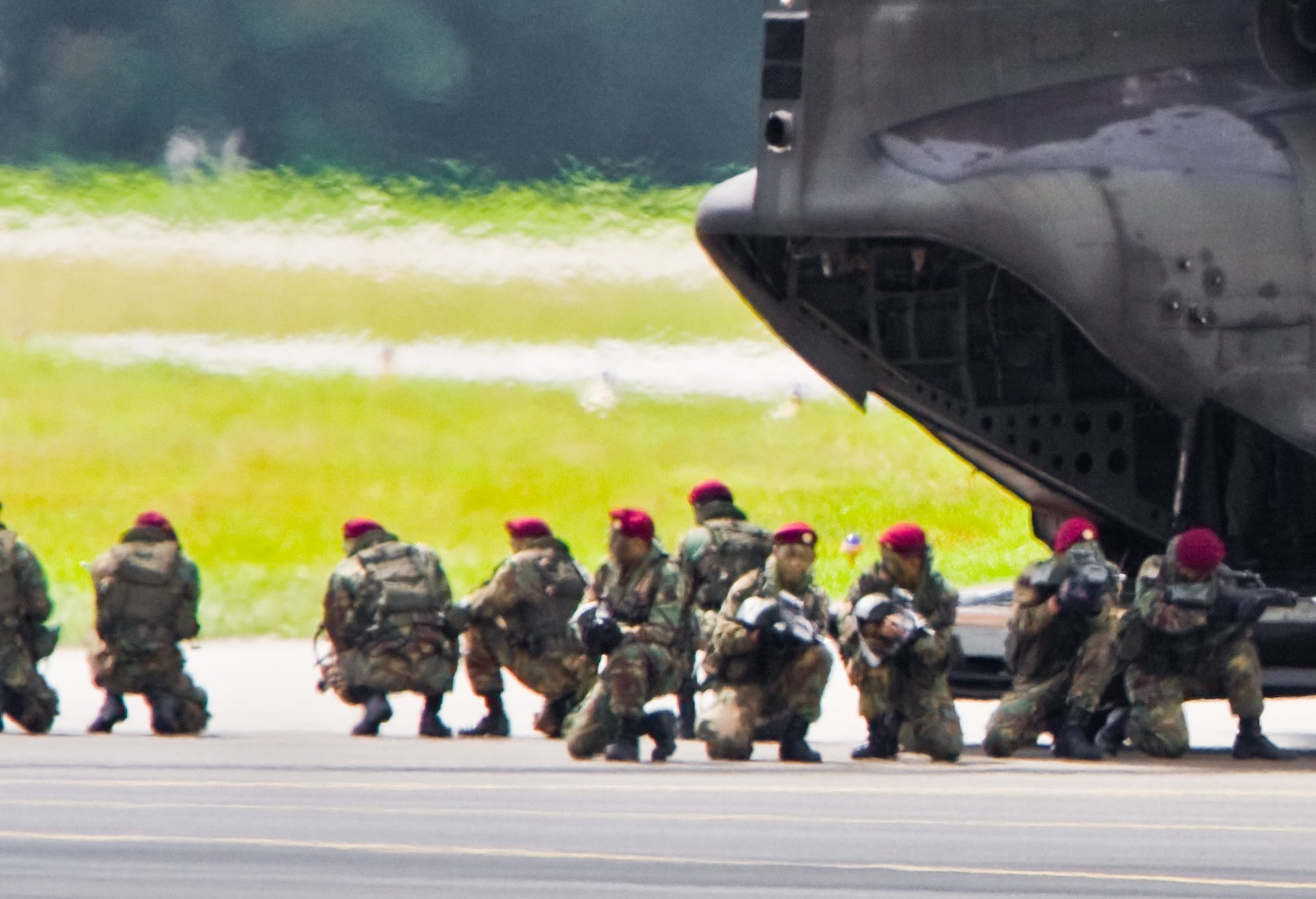
Commandos from the 1st Commando Battalion at an exercise in 2008

The Commandos formation traces its origin to 1967 when two officers, Major Clarence Tan and Major James Chia, were tasked with recruiting eligible candidates from any unit within the Singapore Armed Forces (SAF) to form an elite unit. On 1 December 1969, 30 ten personnel consist of 10 officers and 20 men, all regulars came together to form a unit called the Regular Battalion. Captain Tham Chee Onn was initially the acting commanding officer until Major Clarence Tan subsequently joined the unit, became its commanding officer, and established a training programme for the unit. A second recruitment drive was launched in early 1970 to increase the number of officers in the unit.

On 3 May 1971, the battalion introduced the red beret for its soldiers, and it was renamed 1st Commando Battalion (1 CDO BN) on 16 July 1971. The battalion had only one company at the time. After the Ministry of Defence (MINDEF) allowed Full-Time National Servicemen (NSFs) to join the 1 CDO BN in 1972, a second company was formed on 15 January 1973 from the first batch of conscripts enlisted in the Commandos. From July 1973 to January 1975, three more companies were created. In April 1975, 1 CDO BN was restructured and placed under the command of the 3rd Division (3 DIV). In 1977, 1 CDO BN and two Guards battalions came under the command of the 7th Singapore Infantry Brigade (7 SIB), and they received the state and regimental colours on 22 January 1977 from Minister for Defence Goh Keng Swee.

On 1 July 1980, 1 CDO BN was placed under the command of HQ Infantry. On 1 October that year, the School of Commando Training was established to take charge of 1 CDO BN. Brigadier-General Tan Chin Tiong, acting Chief of the General Staff, presented the 1 CDO BN with its current formation logo, which incorporates a winged stiletto denoting their airborne status, as well as the formation's motto, "For Honour and Glory". On 17 December 1984, the first company, which used to comprise only regulars, started taking in conscripts and training for long-range reconnaissance patrol and divisional disruptive operations. In December 1986, a new Commando tradition started when a stiletto (Fairbairn–Sykes fighting knife) was presented to every Commando of the second company during the ceremony when they received their red berets. Since then, every Commando has received a stiletto after completing two years of service in the battalion.

In 1989, HQ Commandos was established and it received its state and formation colours from President Wee Kim Wee on 20 October 1991. On 27 January 1994, Lieutenant-General Ng Jui Ping, Chief of Defence Force, officially opened Hendon Camp, which has since been the base of the Commando formation. Since 1992, the 1 CDO BN has organised an annual Commando Skills-at-Arms Meet, involving the Commandos competing in various skills such as marksmanship, demolition and completion of the standard obstacle course in full battle order.

In 2005, a sixth company was formed in the 1 CDO BN. It was reported that some Commandos had been deployed to the War in Afghanistan as part of the SAF's Operation Blue Ridge between 2007 and 2013.

== Selection and training ==
The selection process for Commandos is stringent. Potential candidates are screened during the pre-National Service check-up before they enlist in the Singapore Armed Forces (SAF). Shortlisted candidates undergo further tests, security clearance checks, among other things, as well as a panel interview, before they are directly enlisted into one of the 1st Commando Battalion's companies.

=== Basic Military Training ===
All newly enlisted recruits undergo Basic Military Training (BMT) at the Commando Training Institute in Pasir Ris Camp. Upon completing BMT, they proceed for vocational training in specific roles, such as signaller, combat medic, weapons specialist, sniper, small boat operator, and demolition expert. Outstanding trainees who have demonstrated leadership potential may be sent for further training to be specialists or officers.

=== Basic Airborne Course ===
All trainees need to pass the Basic Airborne Course conducted by the Parachute Training Wing to earn the parachutist badge. After completing the basic airborne course, trainees undergo company-level training at Hendon Camp and an overseas training course in Brunei. To mark the end of nine months of training, they go for a 72 kilometres (45 mi) route march before attending a ceremony in Hendon Camp to receive their red berets. The Commandos will continue training extensively in battalion-level operations, rappelling, fast-roping, small boat operations, and other advanced tactics.

Commando reservists are routinely called up for in-camp training after completing their full-time national service and are required to achieve standards higher than their non-Commando counterparts when they take the Individual Physical Proficiency Test (IPPT) every year.

=== School of Commandos ===
The School of Commandos has two training wings: the Commando Training Wing which conducts the "Singapore Armed Forces Ranger Course" (SAF RC) and the Parachute Training Wing which conducts the "Basic Airborne Course" (BAC).

The Commando Training Wing, established in 1974, conducts the Commando Section Leaders' Course, the Commando Small Boat Operators' Course, the Commando Officer Conversion Course, and the Singapore Armed Forces Ranger Course. The Commando Section Leaders' Course trains selected Commandos to become specialists, serving as section leaders. The best performing trainees are selected to undergo further training at the Officer Cadet School (OCS) at the SAFTI Military Institute. After they are commissioned, they return to the Commando Training Wing to attend the Commando Officer Conversion Course to be trained as platoon commanders.

Singapore Armed Forces Ranger Course (SAF RC), 65 days long, is the toughest small unit leadership course in the SAF, with intense combat leadership training focused on small-unit-tactics. First conducted in 1978, it is now conducted annually at Pasir Ris Camp with a limited number of slots open for application to not only Commandos, but also eligible regulars from other formations. Commando regulars have to enrol in the course and, upon completion of the course, they may be recommended to attend the United States Army's Ranger School.

Basic Airborne Course (BAC) covers the static line jumps. The Parachute Training Wing was established in 1974 as the Parachute Training School and started out with instructors trained in the United States and New Zealand. It completed training the first batch of Commandos on 19 October 1974 and subsequently started taking in non-Commando trainees as well. It conducts the Basic Airborne Course for about 120 to 160 trainees per class, as well as more advanced courses such as the Parachute Jump Instructor Course and the Military Free Fall Course.

== Organisation ==
- HQ Commando
- 1st Commando Battalion
- Special Operations Force
- Commando Training Institute (CTI)
  - Special Forces Leadership School
  - Special Operations Evaluation And Training Centre
  - Commando Training Wing
  - Parachute Training Wing

== Known Operations ==
- Laju ferry hijacking

On 1 January 1974, four terrorists from the Popular Front for the Liberation of Palestine and Japanese Red Army attacked an oil refinery on Pulau Bukom and hijacked the ferry Laju and took five hostages. After negotiations with the Singapore Government, the terrorists freed the hostages on 8 February 1974 and boarded a flight to Kuwait. They were escorted by 13 men, of which four were Commandos.

- Operation Thunderstorm

On 8 May 1975, the Commandos and the Navy stormed several vessels carrying Vietnamese refugees intruding into Singapore waters. They kept watch on the refugees and the crews until they were resupplied and escorted out of Singapore about two days later.

- Operation Thunderbolt

On 26 March 1991, Singapore Airlines Flight 117 was hijacked by four Pakistani militants, who took all 129 people on board hostage. When the plane landed at Changi Airport, an unknown number of Commandos from the Special Operations Force (SOF) stormed the plane, killed the four hijackers and freed the hostages within five minutes. The Commandos were awarded the Medal of Valour for their achievement.

- United Nations Transitional Authority in Cambodia

Commandos were deployed as peacekeepers alongside Super Puma helicopters.

- Operation Blue Heron

Commandos were deployed as peacekeepers to East Timor from May 2001 to November 2002 while having small arms.

- Operation Blue Orchid

Commandos deployed to Iraq from 2002 to 2008 to protect Singaporean Air Force aircraft and crew providing humanitarian relief and transporting essential supplies.

- Operation Flying Eagle

Commandos were deployed in Aceh to ensure safety of SAF forces providing humanitarian relief.

- Operation Blue Ridge

Commandos were deployed alongside regular SAF forces from 2007 to 2013 for protection and support operations.

== Incidents ==
The Commandos have won the Singapore Armed Forces' annual Best Combat Unit competition many times since 1969. However, in 2003, 1 CDO BN was barred from the competition after it was found guilty of doctoring score-keeping records and fitness test results.

On 21 August 2003, a Guardsman, Second Sergeant Hu Enhuai, died during a combat survival training course conducted by the Commandos. Four Commandos were charged in court a year later for carrying out the "dunking" procedure deemed inappropriate for training purposes. On 3 September 2003, another Guardsman, Second Sergeant Rajagopal Thirukumaran, died after a run during the selection process for the Ranger Course conducted by the Commando Training Wing.

On 15 June 2005, Second Sergeant Ong Jia Hui, a member of the Maritime Counter-Terrorism Group, drowned during training at Changi Naval Base. On 13 July 2005, First Sergeant Shiva s/o Mohan fell from 20 metres above the ground while rappelling from a helicopter and was pronounced dead in hospital about two hours later.

On 20 June 2006, Lieutenant Lionel Lin died after encountering difficulties while training at the swimming pool in Hendon Camp.

On 13 March 2010, First Sergeant Woo Teng Hai was accidentally shot by a villager during overseas training in Thailand. He was flown back to Singapore on the same day and was discharged from hospital by the end of that month.

== Equipment ==
The following is a list of equipment known to be used by the Commandos:

Model	Image	Origin	Notes	References
Pistols
Glock 17		Austria		
Glock 19		Austria		
FN Five-seven		Belgium		
SIG Sauer P226		Switzerland		
Submachine guns
Heckler & Koch MP5		Germany		
Heckler & Koch MP7A1		Germany		
FN P90		Belgium		
SIG MPX		United States		
Assault rifles
SAR 21		Singapore		
BR18		Singapore		
Heckler & Koch HK416		Germany		
M4 carbine		United States		
SIG MCX		United States		
SCAR-L		Belgium		
Others
M203 grenade launcher		United States		
SFG 87		Singapore		
