= Special Operations Force (Singapore) =

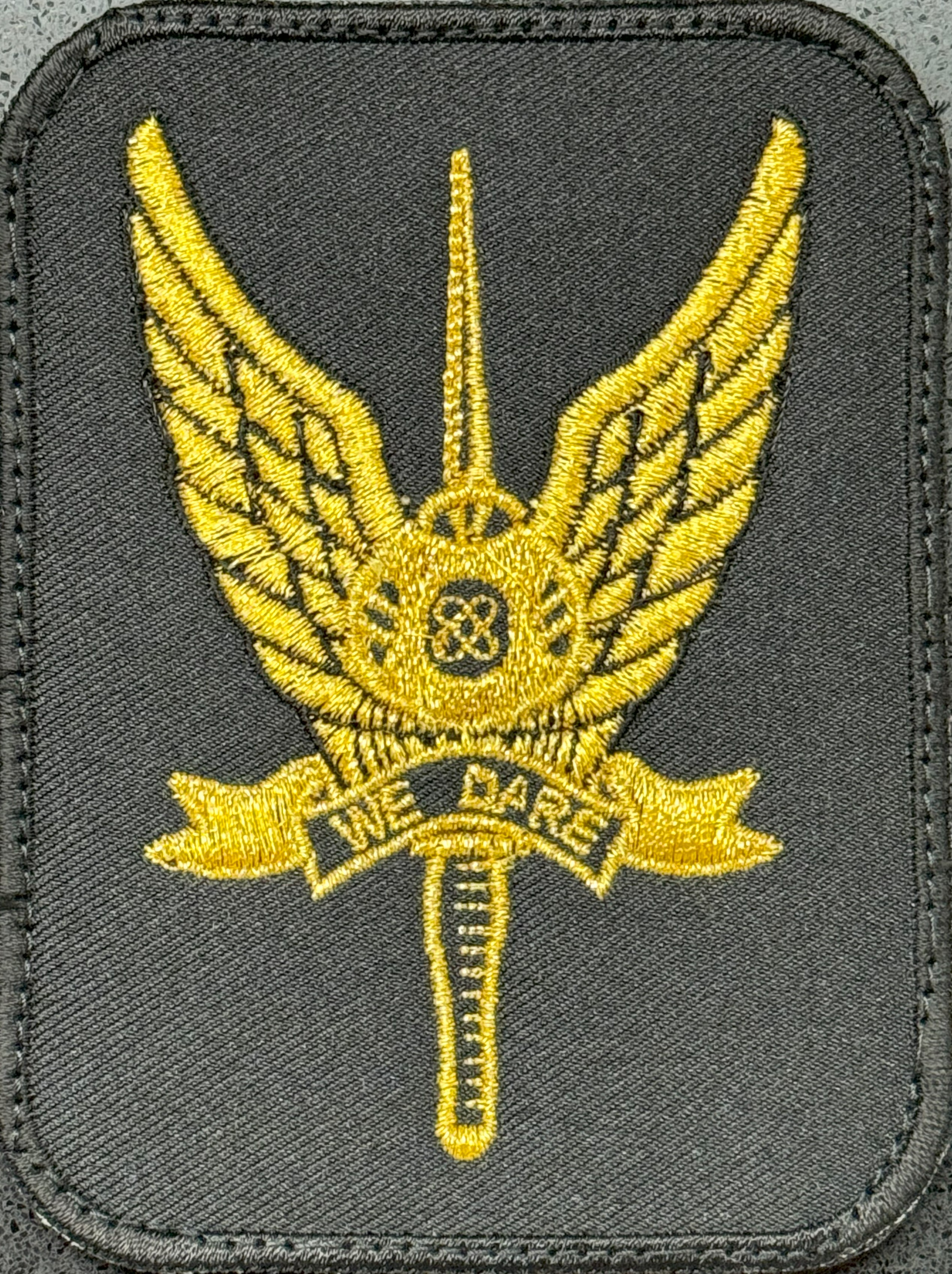
- Patch of the Special Operations Force
- Active: 1984 – present
- Country: Singapore
- Branch: Singapore Army
- Type: Special forces
- Role: Special operations; Direct action; Counter-terrorism; Special reconnaissance
- Part of: Commandos; Special Operations Task Force
- Engagements: Operation Thunderbolt

Commanders
- Notable commanders: Colonel Lam Shiu Tong; Colonel Chiang Hock Woon

The Special Operations Force (SOF) is the primary special forces unit of the Singapore Army responsible for conducting special operations. The SOF is only composed of highly trained regular servicemen, most of whom are from the Commandos formation.

It is also a component of the Special Operations Task Force (SOTF), alongside the Special Warfare Group (SWG) of the Naval Diving Unit (NDU), which is an elite force of the Republic of Singapore Navy (RSN).

== History ==
On 27 September 1972, a flight engineer aboard Olympic Airlines Flight 472 accidentally activated a hijack alarm. The flight, which had 31 passengers and 11 crew members on board, took off from Sydney, Australia at 1030 hours SST and was heading towards Paya Lebar Airport in Singapore. The Australian authorities were not informed of the situation until four hours later. Following a flurry of conflicting reports, Australia's Civil Aviation Safety Authority warned Paya Lebar Airport to be prepared for a possible hijack.

Flight 472 landed in Singapore at 1825 hours SST and was immediately surrounded by the police before the Singapore authorities could confirm that it was a false alarm. The incident highlighted the lack of special forces trained and equipped to deal with a hijack or hostage situation in Singapore.

As a result, an anti-terrorism team was formed which was renamed as the Special Operations Force in 1984.

=== Operation Thunderbolt (1991) ===
On 26 March 1991, Singapore Airlines Flight 117 was hijacked in flight by four men, who took all 129 people on board hostage. At Singapore Changi Airport, commandos from the SOF stormed the plane, killed the four hijackers and freed the hostages in under a minute. This also marked the SOF's first combat operation.

Commando HQ was awarded a Medal of Valor and a unit citation for the success of the operation.

== Training ==
every candidate who wants to join Special Operations Force (SOF) Must take the Joint Special Forces Selection Test (JSFST) for 2 weeks conducted by Special Forces Leadership School, those who pass will participate in Special Forces Qualification Course (SFQC) for 8 months. In 2022, Singapore Ministry of Defence released a documentary on its YouTube channel about the Joint Special Forces Selection Test (JSFST), titled Uncommon Grit The series spans 5 episodes.out of 120 people took part in Joint Special Forces Selection Test (JSFST) process only 30 qualified to participate Special Forces Qualification Course (SFQC) only 10 passed the Course.

== See also ==
- History of Singapore Armed Forces
