= Special Warfare Group (Singapore) =

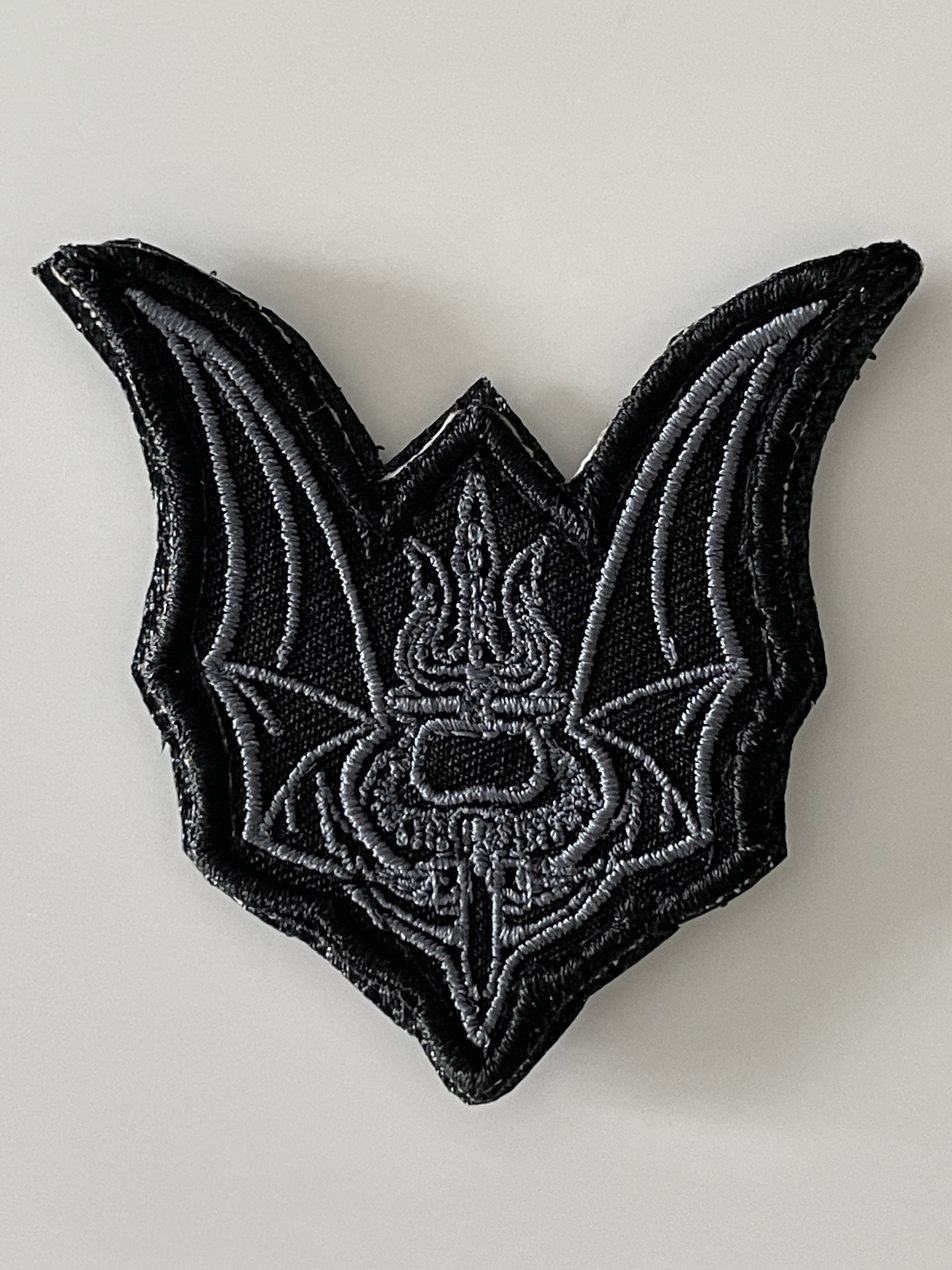
- Patch of the Special Warfare Group
- Active: 1989 – present
- Country: Singapore
- Branch: Republic of Singapore Navy
- Type: Special forces
- Role: Special operations; Direct action; Counter-terrorism; Special reconnaissance
- Part of: Naval Diving Unit; Special Operations Task Force
- Garrison/HQ: Sembawang Camp
- Nickname: "A-Team"
- Mottos: "Will to Do, Spirit to Dare"

Commanders
- Notable commanders: COL Lau Bock Thiam

The Special Warfare Group (SWG) is the primary special forces unit of the Republic of Singapore Navy (RSN) responsible for conducting special operations from sea, air, and land. It is one of six squadrons of the Naval Diving Unit (NDU).

It is also a component of the Special Operations Task Force (SOTF), alongside the Special Operations Force (SOF) of the Singapore Army.

Information about the SWG is designated as classified.

== History ==
Formed in 1989 and started with 13 operators handpicked from regular forces, the group prosecutes special operations and counter-terrorism operations in the maritime domain, with capabilities of being deployed from the sea, air, and land. Due to the sensitive nature of their operations, their size and the identities of their operators are kept classified.

== Selection and training ==
To qualify as an operator of the Special Warfare Group, prospective candidates must be regular servicemen and pass the Combat Diver Course, Special Forces Qualification Course, and Special Warfare Advanced Training. Operators within the squadron are tasked with conducting maritime special operations including counter-terrorism and direct action. The size of the unit and the details of their missions are kept classified due to their sensitive nature.

Best performing operators are often sent to overseas courses such as the United States Navy's Basic Underwater Demolition/SEAL course.

== See also ==
- History of Singapore Armed Forces
