= Special Operations Task Force =

Special forces of Singapore

- Active: 30 June 2009 (Note: Official announcement to create the unit was first reported on this date.) – present
- Country: Singapore
- Type: Special forces
- Role: Special operations; Counter-terrorism
- Part of: Singapore Armed Forces
- Motto: "When No One Else Can"

Commanders
- Current commander: BG Tjioe Jin Kiat Alvin
- Notable commanders: Colonel Lam Shiu Tong (Commander)

Insignia
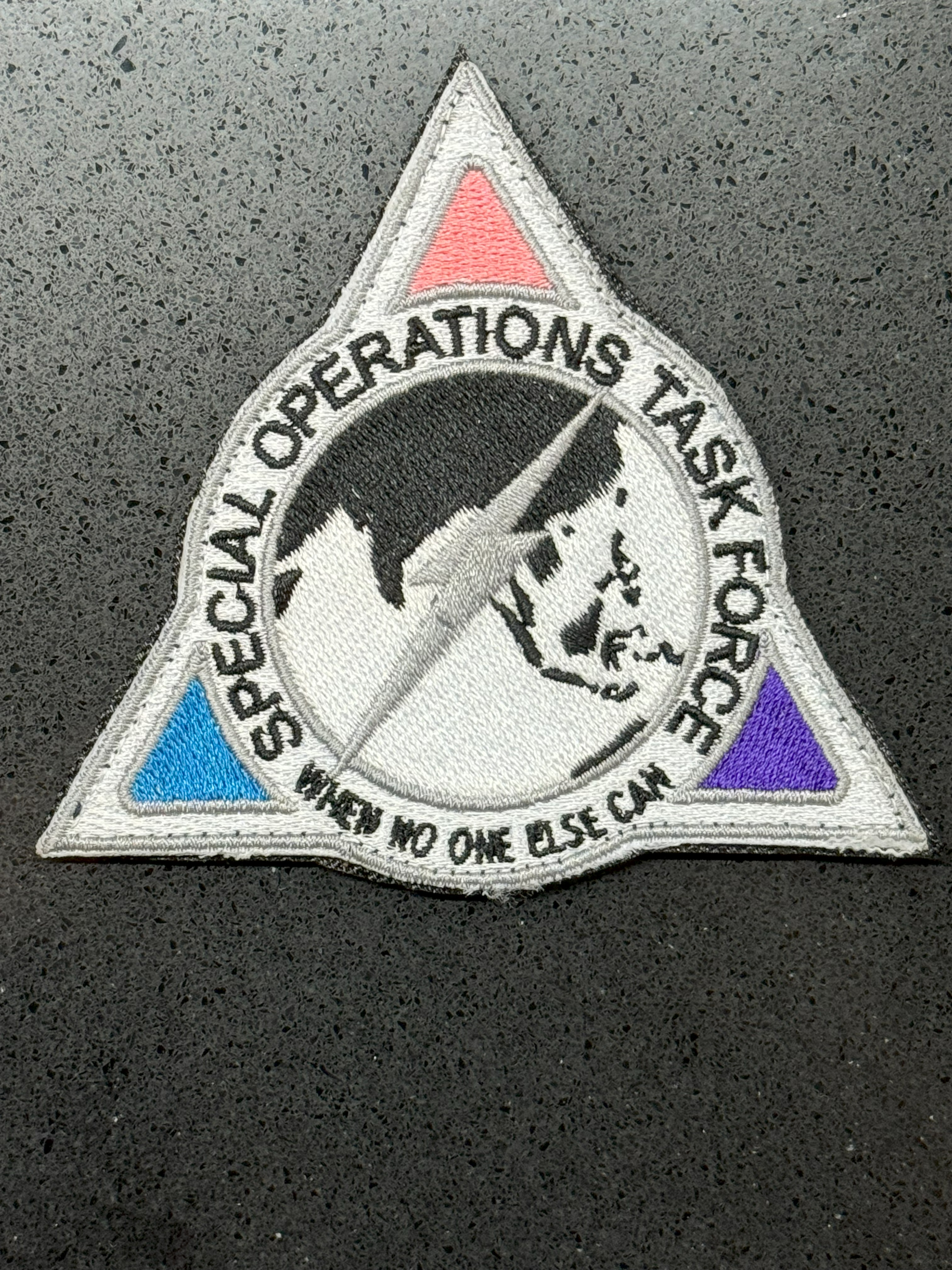
- Patch

The Special Operations Task Force (SOTF, Chinese: 特别行动特遣部队, Malay: Pasukan Petugas Operasi Khas) is a special operations command of the Singapore Armed Forces (SAF) responsible for conducting special operations. The SOTF is composed of only highly-trained regular servicemen from the Army's Special Operations Force (SOF) under the Commandos formation and, the Navy's Special Warfare Group (SWG) under the Naval Diving Unit (NDU).

The primary role of SOTF is to combat terrorist threats that would harm Singaporean interests at home and overseas. According to Colonel Benedict Lim, then Assistant Chief of General Staff (Operations), the SOTF is responsible for conducting counter-terrorism operations at the national level.

== History ==
On 30 June 2009, it was officially announced to the media that the Singapore Government was planning to create the Special Operations Task Force (SOTF) to counter all terrorist threats from land, sea and air.

According to Deputy Prime Minister and Minister for Defence Teo Chee Hean, the unit's establishment was needed because Singapore is not "dealing only with people with guns. They may be dealing with people who have very powerful explosives and various kinds of other substances, chemical, radiological and so on, so you need to develop capabilities to deal with these things. You have to deal with them at sea, at shore, buildings, aeroplanes, ships, coastlines and so on, so you do need to bring together these capabilities, develop them in a much more complete, coherent and integrated way." In addition, Colonel Lam commented on the 2008 Mumbai attacks "where terrorists are getting smarter as well. They are getting more organised—they learnt from what the special and security forces are doing."

The SOTF saw its inaugural monograph Key Perspectives on Special Forces (2009) published in the same year the integrated unit was formed. The monograph was edited and developed by Captain Kwong Weng Yap, a Commando officer who served as the head of its leadership development. The monograph was published by Pointer, the journal of the Singapore Armed Forces (SAF). The publication introduces the first comprehensive monograph involving Singapore’s special forces from the Army and Navy; it offers a critical examination of the history, evolution and theory of special forces. Professor Denis Fischbacher-Smith of the University of Glasgow commented that the monograph "provided the reader a stimulating insight into the working and thought processes that underpin the selection, training, and deployment of these elite troops. Moreover, it is rare for such a collection to be made available from serving and recent members of elite forces, and for that reason, the book is an important contribution to the literature."

The SOTF is a military command rather than an actual unit, combining the Commandos formation's Special Operations Force (SOF) and the Navy's Naval Diving Unit (NDU)—both of which are well-established units, as an integrated force and operational command. Furthermore, the task force would be able to tackle and adapt to various threats according to the various specialties of Singapore's elite units.

The SOTF had recently participated in the Exercise Northstar VII drills, neutralising several "terrorists" after they have infiltrated Sentosa.

On 11 March 2011, Colonel Chiang Hock Woon was appointed to serve as Commander of SOTF, replacing then-Colonel, Brigadier-General Lam Shiu Tong, who will be appointed Commander of 2nd People's Defence Force (2PDF).

On 22 January 2016, Colonel Nicholas Ang was appointed to serve as Commander of SOTF, replacing Colonel Simon Lim.

On 4 December 2019, during the Commandos' Golden Jubilee celebrations, Minister for Defence Ng Eng Hen helped commission the new Special Operations Command Centre for the SOTF and the SAF to better execute counter-terrorism operations and it is based at the Commandos' headquarters, Hendon Camp. The SOCC is a joint project between the SAF and the Defence Science and Technology Agency (DSTA), being equipped with a C4I system.

== Operations ==
Every year, the SOTF participate in counter-terrorism exercises led by the Singapore Police Force (SPF) in order to validate their operational response to any large-scale terrorist attacks or when there is a heightened security threat to Singapore.

== Formation ==
The following units are to be placed under command of SOTF:

- Special Warfare Group From Naval Diving Unit
- Commandos
- Special Operations Force

=== Headquarters ===
The SOTF includes personnel from the Navy and Air Force, who are in charge of mobilising resources for SOTF missions based on their service-specific knowledge.

Colonel Tan Tai Tiong said in a statement that SOTF operators "are not losing our individual identities as Divers and Commandos, but gaining a valuable partner in each other's skill sets."

== Equipment ==
=== Weapons ===
Pistols
Model	Origin	Caliber	Version	Notes
FN Five-Seven	Belgium	FN 5.7×28mm	Five-Seven USG	
Submachine guns
H&K MP7	Germany	HK 4.6×30mm	MP7A1	
FN P90	Belgium	FN 5.7×28mm	P90 TR	In use. Being replaced by MP7A1s.
Assault rifles
H&K HK416	Germany	5.56×45mm NATO	D10RS D14.5RS	
SAR 21	Singapore	5.56×45mm NATO	Varies	
M4 Carbine	United States	5.56×45mm NATO	Colt M4A1 SOPMOD	Being replaced by HK416 carbines.

=== Vehicles ===
- Renault Higuard MRAP (Peacekeeping Protection Vehicle)
- Light Strike Vehicle Mark II
- Airbus Helicopters H225M
- Ford Super Duty (Patriot 3 Mobile Adjustable Ramp System)
- Very Slender Vessel from Halmatic Marine
- Mercedes Benz G Wagon
- Volkswagen Golf R 2018
- Rigid Haul Inflatable Boat (RHIB)

== See also ==
- History of Singapore Armed Forces
