= Conventional Multirole Combat Rifle =

STK CMCR
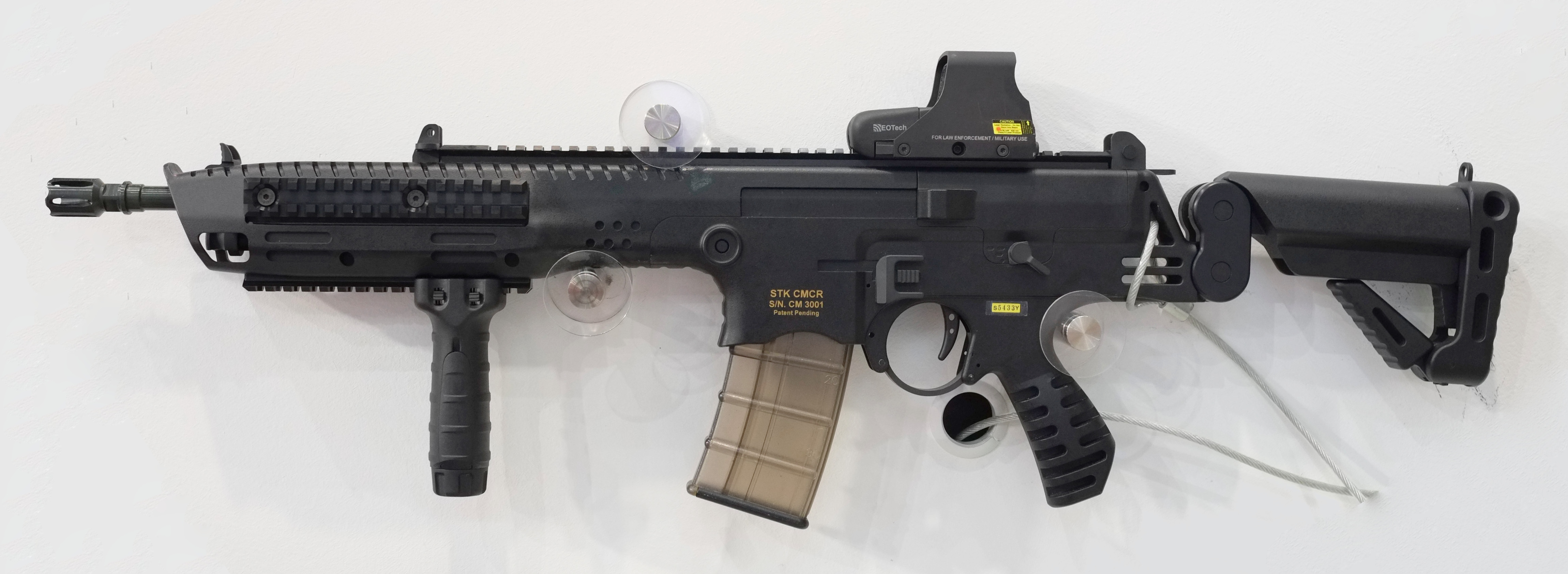
- The STK CMCR on display at the Singapore Airshow 2014
- Type: Semi-automatic rifle
- Place of origin: Singapore

Production history
- Manufacturer: ST Engineering (formerly ST Kinetics)
- Produced: 2014

Specifications
- Cartridge: 5.56×45mm NATO
- Caliber: 5.56mm 6.8mm 7.62mm
- Action: Semi-automatic, Gas-operated, rotating bolt
- Rate of fire: Semi-automatic only
- Feed system: 10-, 20- or 30-round detachable STANAG magazine 100-round Beta C-Mag drum magazine
- Sights: Iron sights

The STK CMCR is an assault rifle made by ST Engineering (formerly ST Kinetics) of Singapore.

The rifle was unveiled at the Singapore Airshow 2014. The STK CMCR is designed to fire 5.56×45mm NATO ammunition and ST Kinetics’ Extended Range 5.56mm ammunition, and comes standard with MIL-STD-1913 Picatinny rails at the three, six, nine and 12 o'clock positions.

== See also ==
- BR18
