= Singaporean response to Hurricane Katrina =

Following the devastation of the United States and Gulf Coast by Hurricane Katrina, Singaporean Prime Minister Lee Hsien Loong sent his personal letter of condolences to U.S. President George W. Bush while the Singaporean Foreign Minister George Yeo sent his personal letter of condolences to the U.S. Secretary of State Condoleezza Rice, promising support for the American people in their relief effort in the wake of Hurricane Katrina.

In his letter, Lee wrote:

"The thoughts of Singaporeans and me are with you and the American people whose lives have been devastated by Hurricane Katrina. America has always been generous in helping others in their time of need. We in Southeast Asia have experienced that, most recently during the tsunami relief operations. Singapore is happy to reciprocate in a small way by participating in your efforts to save lives and restore normality to your people."

== Relief operations ==
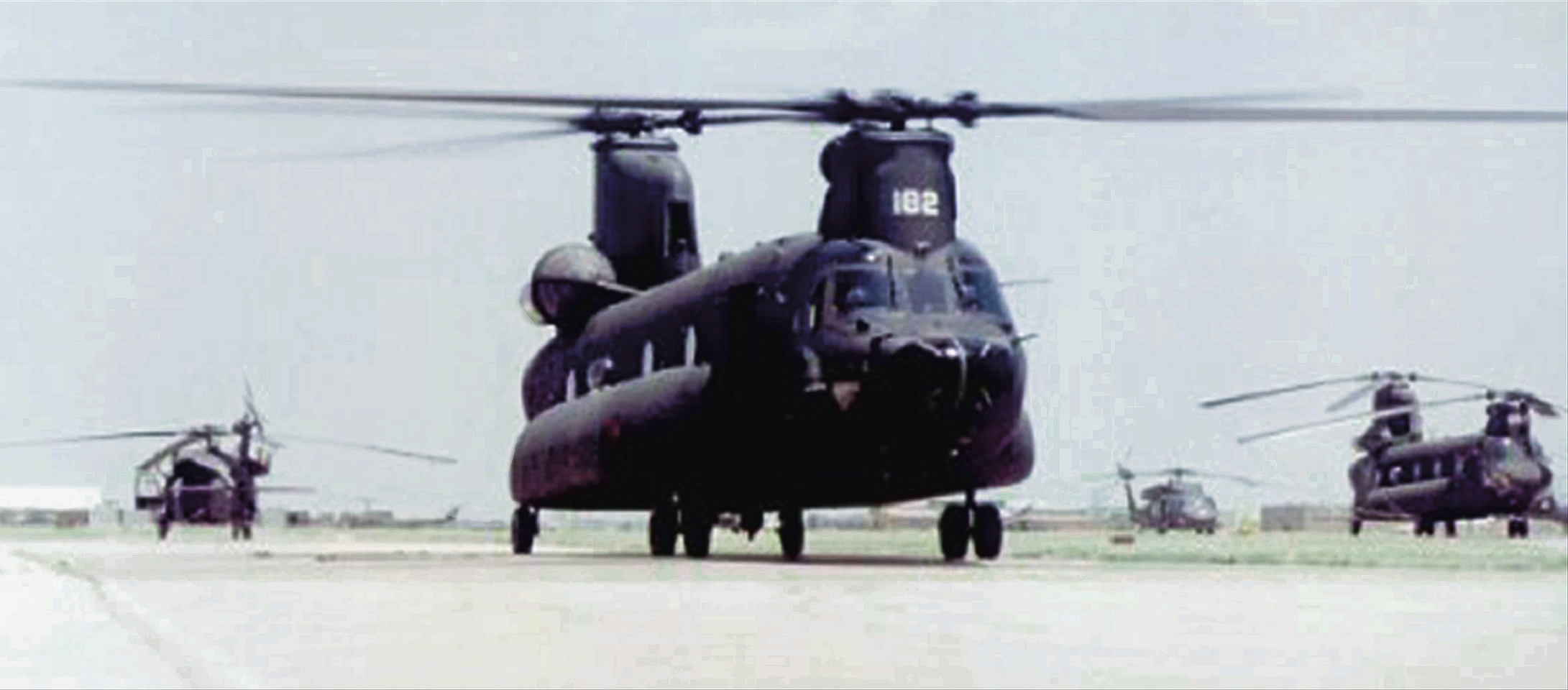
The Republic of Singapore Air Force committed four CH-47 Chinook helicopters and 45 personnel toward the relief effort in the wake of Hurricane Katrina.

On 1 September, the Republic of Singapore Air Force (RSAF) sent three CH-47 Chinook helicopters to Louisiana to assist in relief operations. The three aircraft were based at the Peace Prairie Singapore training detachment of the Texas Army National Guard's 149th Aviation Regiment in Grand Prairie AASF, Grand Prairie, Texas. They arrived in Fort Polk, Louisiana in the afternoon of 1 September to aid rescue operations mainly in resupply and airlifting missions.

Thirty eight RSAF personnel, comprising pilots, aircrew and technicians were also deployed. The Singapore team worked with the Texas Army National Guard in the relief efforts.

On 5 September, a fourth Chinook helicopter was sent to help in the relief operations, and the number of personnel deployed increased to 45.

Throughout the Singaporean relief effort, the four Chinooks flew 61 sorties. They transported hundreds of evacuees from flooded areas to safety, especially from the Louisiana Superdome and Ernest N. Morial Convention Center. They also picked up stragglers around the New Orleans area. The Chinooks carried a total of 540 tonnes of equipment, humanitarian aid, cargo, and supplies and rescued over 800 evacuees. They were involved in moving sand bags to block up the broken levees. The number of aircraft sent exceeded that of all other foreign countries.

The Peace Prairie detachment was led by Lieutenant-Colonel Kevin Rodrigues.

American Ambassador to Singapore Frank Lavin said the American people were deeply grateful for Singapore's help. He added that RSAF personnel were saving lives in Louisiana and that the other Gulf Coast States and Americans would long remember this.

During Hurricane Katrina, the Singapore Red Cross launched a public appeal to help victims of Hurricane Katrina. It requested donations from Singaporeans to the emergency so that the fund could be used to assist displaced and homeless victims through the American Red Cross.

== "Singapore and Katrina" ==
American Op-Ed columnist for the New York Times Thomas Friedman wrote an article Singapore and Katrina reflecting on the American government's management performance after the hurricane, which he felt was slovenly and compared poorly to Singapore's governance. He cited among others Kishore Mahbubani, dean of the Lee Kuan Yew School of Public Policy who explained the reason behind the efficiency of the Singaporean Government: "... You lose New Orleans, and you have 100 other cities just like it. But we're a city-state. We lose Singapore and there is nothing else. ... ".

== See also ==
- Hurricane Katrina
- Hurricane Katrina disaster relief
- Singapore's response to the December 2004 Indian Ocean earthquake and tsunami
- Singapore's response to Hurricane Katrina
- Singapore's response to the October 2005 Kashmir earthquake
- Singapore's response to the May 2008 Sichuan earthquake
- Singapore's response to the January 2010 Haiti earthquake
- Singapore's response to the March 2011 Japan earthquake and tsunami
- Singapore's response to Typhoon Haiyan
- Singapore's response to the April and May 2015 Nepal earthquake
