= SAF Day Parade =

Singaporean military parade

The SAF Day Parade is an annual military parade and ceremony of the Singapore Armed Forces (SAF) held on 1 July in commemoration of the founding of the SAF. It is the second military parade in seniority to be held in Singapore next to the Singapore National Day Parade on 9 August. It is usually held at the SAFTI Military Institute in Jurong West, with the presence of the president of Singapore. Salutes are also taken by the prime minister of Singapore, and the chief of Defence Force.

Close to 3,000 Operationally Ready National Servicemen (NSmen) take part in the ceremony, including personnel of any one of the Singapore Armed Forces Bands (either the SAF Central Band or SAF Ceremonial Band A) or the Singapore Armed Forces Military Police Command. The SAF performs a traditional Trooping the Colour ceremony during the parade, following the British Army's regimental tradition. The awards for the Singapore Armed Forces Best Unit Competition are conferred upon the winning units during the parade. The Guard of Honour is mounted by five contingents numbered 1 to 5 guard. The first Guard of Honour contingent is mounted by the SAF Military Police Command's Military Police Enforcement Unit (MPEU) as they are entrusted to uphold the highest standard of drill and thus form the Escort to the Colour during Trooping. The 2nd Guard of Honour Contingent is made up of the current year's winner for the Army's Best Unit Competition (Usually the 1st Commando Battalion). The outgoing colour ensign for the Singapore Army hands the Army's State colour over to the colour bearer for the Best Combat Unit of the year. The 3rd, 4th and 5th Guard of Honour Contingents is mounted by the Naval Diving Unit representing the Republic of Singapore Navy (RSN), the Air Power Generation Command representing the Republic of Singapore Air Force (RSAF) and personnel from the Digital and Intelligence Service (DIS), according the order of precedence. 10 supporting units from all four services are also located to the rear of the Guard of Honour formation. A re-affirmation of the Singapore Armed Forces Pledge of loyalty by all members of the SAF followed by a minute's silence ended by the National Anthem are played. Defence attaches of the various foreign missions, senior officers from the HomeTeam as well as the SAF Veteran's League are also invited to attend the parade.

== History ==
The first SAF Day in 1969 was celebrated with a military parade at Jalan Besar Stadium with Minister for the Interior and Defence Lim Kim San being the presiding officer. A muster parade at the MID HQ on Pearl's Hill also took place as well as several smaller parades at various SAF camps. During the first parade, a 1,500-strong contingent of SAF personnel took part in the marchpast, as well as stood at attention during the presentation of the SAF Flag for the first time to the 3rd Battalion, Singapore Infantry Regiment by Minister Lim. NSmen were allowed to participate in the parade as commanders for the first time in 1994. The first National Service (NS Men) officer to be Parade Commander of the SAF Day Parade was Lieutenant Colonel (LTC) Johnny Lim. The 2015 parade was known as the SAF50 Parade in commemoration of the 50th anniversary of the parade, which included a special aerial flypast fighter planes and helicopters as well as the attendance of SAF pioneers who were present at the first SAF Day Parade in 1969. In 2024, the parade was held indoors due to inclement weather. This parade also marked the first time which a female officer takes command of the parade as the Parade Commander during the same year.

== See also ==
- Armed Forces Day
