= Drownproofing =

Survival technique

Drownproofing is a method for surviving in water disaster scenarios without sinking or drowning. It is also famous as a class once required at the Georgia Institute of Technology.

== History ==
Drownproofing was developed by swimming coach Fred Lanoue and was first taught in 1940. His method was so successful that it gained national recognition, and Georgia Tech soon made it a requirement for graduation, until 1988. The US Navy also took interest, and adopted it as part of their standard training. It is claimed that during Lanoue's time teaching at Tech from 1936 to 1964, he taught drownproofing to some 20,000 students.

Once they had mastered the Drownproofing technique, students learned to stay afloat with their wrists and ankles bound, swim 50 yards (46 m) underwater, and retrieve diving rings from the bottom of the pool using their teeth. Lanoue published a book called Drownproofing, a New Technique for Water Safety in 1963. Georgia Tech dropped the course from its curriculum in 1988, as part of a downsizing of its physical education and athletics department.

Drownproofing has been for many years widely taught to recruits in the U.S. Navy, U.S. Marine Corps, and U.S. Coast Guard.

Reagh "Doc" Wetmore, swimming coach at Boston University, shared Fred Lanoue's enthusiasm for Drownproofing and continued to teach the technique until his retirement at the end of 2005.

== See also ==
- Treading water
