= BR18 =

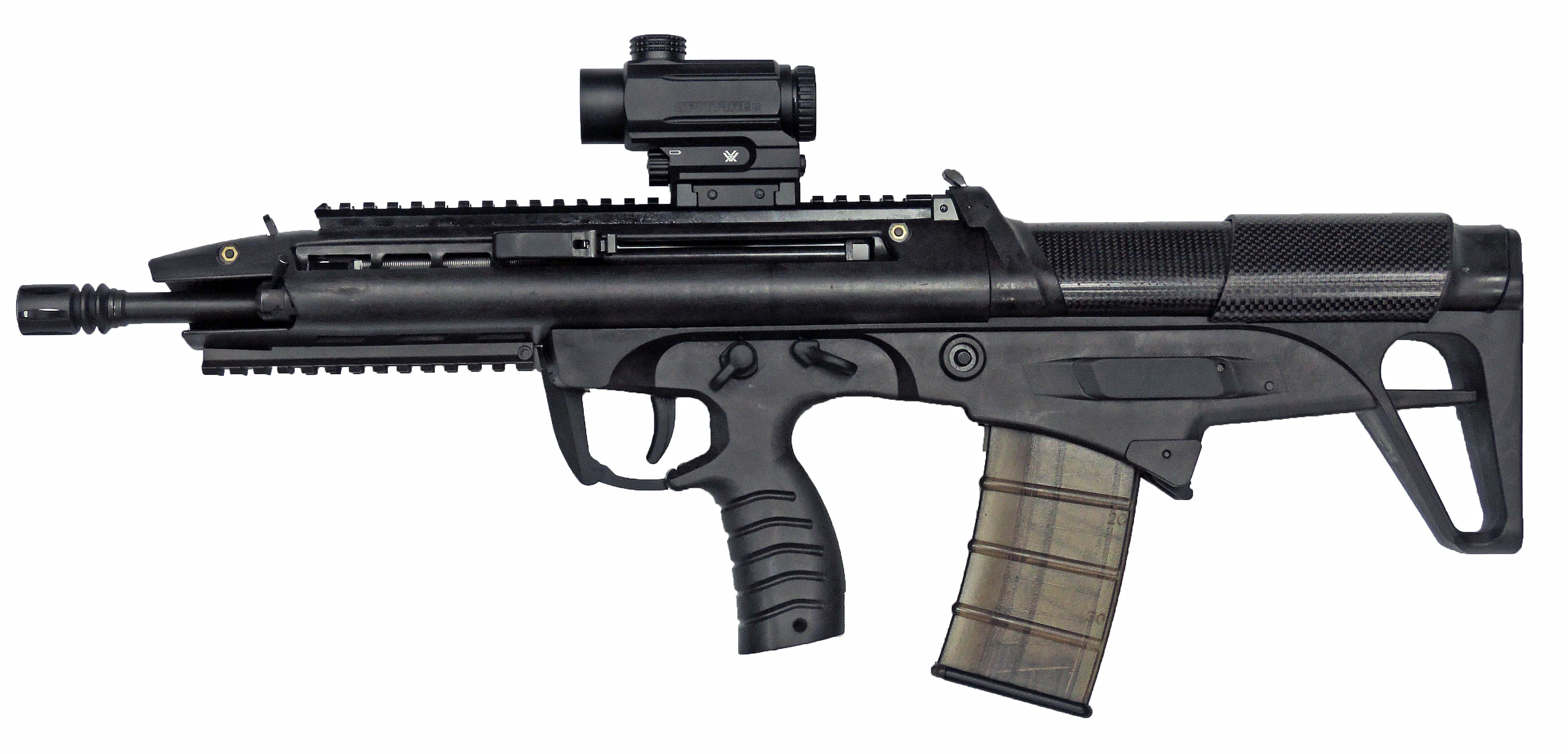
- The BR18 assault rifle, left side view
- Type: Bullpup assault rifle
- Place of origin: Singapore

Production history
- Designer: Advanced Material Engineering
- Designed: 2012–2014 (Prototypes); 2017 (Preproduction models)
- Manufacturer: ST Engineering (formerly ST Kinetics)
- Produced: 2018–present
- Variants: See Variants for details

Specifications
- Cartridge: 5.56×45mm NATO
- Caliber: 5.56mm
- Action: Gas-operated, rotating bolt
- Rate of fire: 700–900 rounds/min
- Effective firing range: 650 m (710 yd)
- Maximum firing range: 1,000 m (1,100 yd)
- Feed system: 10-, 20- or 30-round detachable STANAG magazine or SAR-21 magazines
- Sights: Any scopes/tactical aiming device compatible with the picatinny railing Built-in iron sights

The BR18 is a bullpup assault rifle made by ST Engineering of Singapore, and formerly ST Kinetics.

The rifle was officially unveiled at the Singapore Airshow 2014 as the Bullpup Multirole Combat Rifle. The rifle is designed to fire both 5.56×45mm NATO and ST Kinetics Extended Range 5.55mm ammunition and comes as standard with MIL-STD-1913 Picatinny rails at the three, six, nine and 12 o’clock positions.

Its production was meant to enable the Singaporean military to phase out the SAR 21 from service. It was also offered for sale on the international market.

== History ==
The BR18 first made an appearance at the 2012 Singapore Airshow, where it was known as the Next-Gen Concept Bullpup Rifle. In 2014, the BR18 was first unveiled in the Eurosatory exhibition, called the BMCR. The rifle was to be available to both military and law enforcement markets by early 2015.

After user trials were conducted in 2017, ST Kinetics demonstrated the production version of the rifle, which was given the name of BR18 at the 2018 Singapore Airshow exhibition.

== Design ==
The BR18's barrel is coated with a proprietary dry lubricant which repels sand, dust, and gunpowder soot for easier maintenance. The rifle is also designed to be over the beach (OTB) capable, enabling the operator to safely fire after submerging the rifle in water.

The weapon is constructed of reinforced, blast-proof polymer and is equipped with MIL-STD-1913 "Picatinny" rails to mount scopes and other tactical accessories. While the design was influenced by the SAR-21, the BR18 allows it to be used by both left or right handed users with empty casing ejections set forward and to the right by a front deflector, away from the person's face if the weapon is fired from the left shoulder.

ST Kinetics has said that the BR18 has an effective range of 460 m and 800 m when fired with M193 and SS109 ammunition respectively, with a muzzle velocity of 860 m/s when employing SS109 rounds out of the "Assault" variant, equipped with a 14.5" barrel.

The charging handle is placed above the trigger guard. Initial designs showed the charging handle positioned above the cheek rest, which meant that the person would have been forced to move away from the rifle in order to pull the bolt. Pre-production models improved on this by designing the charging handle to be foldable with one hand and pulled back by using two fingers, using the force of the handle moving to be stowed.

The trigger guard can be flipped outwards so that the shooter can handle the weapon if using gloves.

While a 5.56 version is already scheduled for production, a 7.62×51mm NATO version is currently being developed. The BR18 can use a STK-made 40 GL attached underneath the barrel via picatinny rails.

== Gallery ==
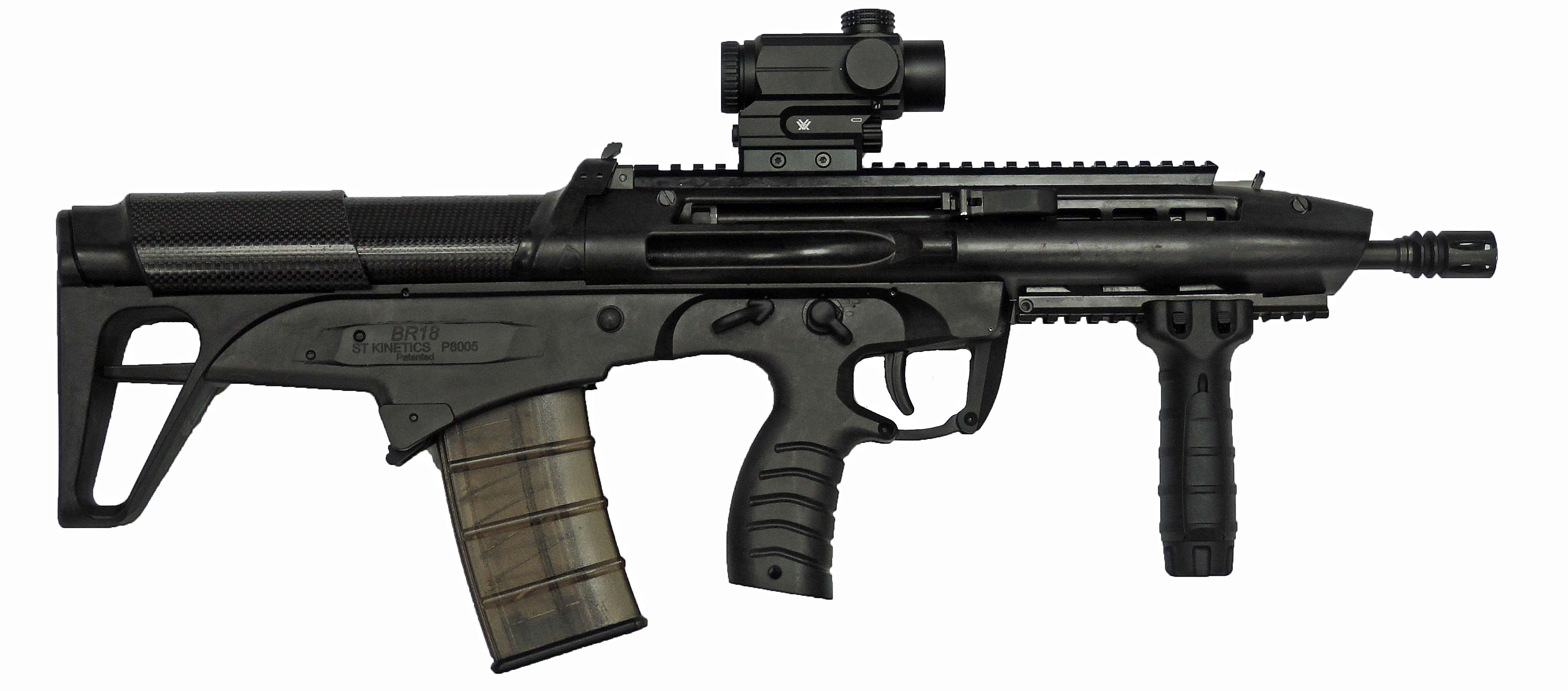
BR18 rifle, right side

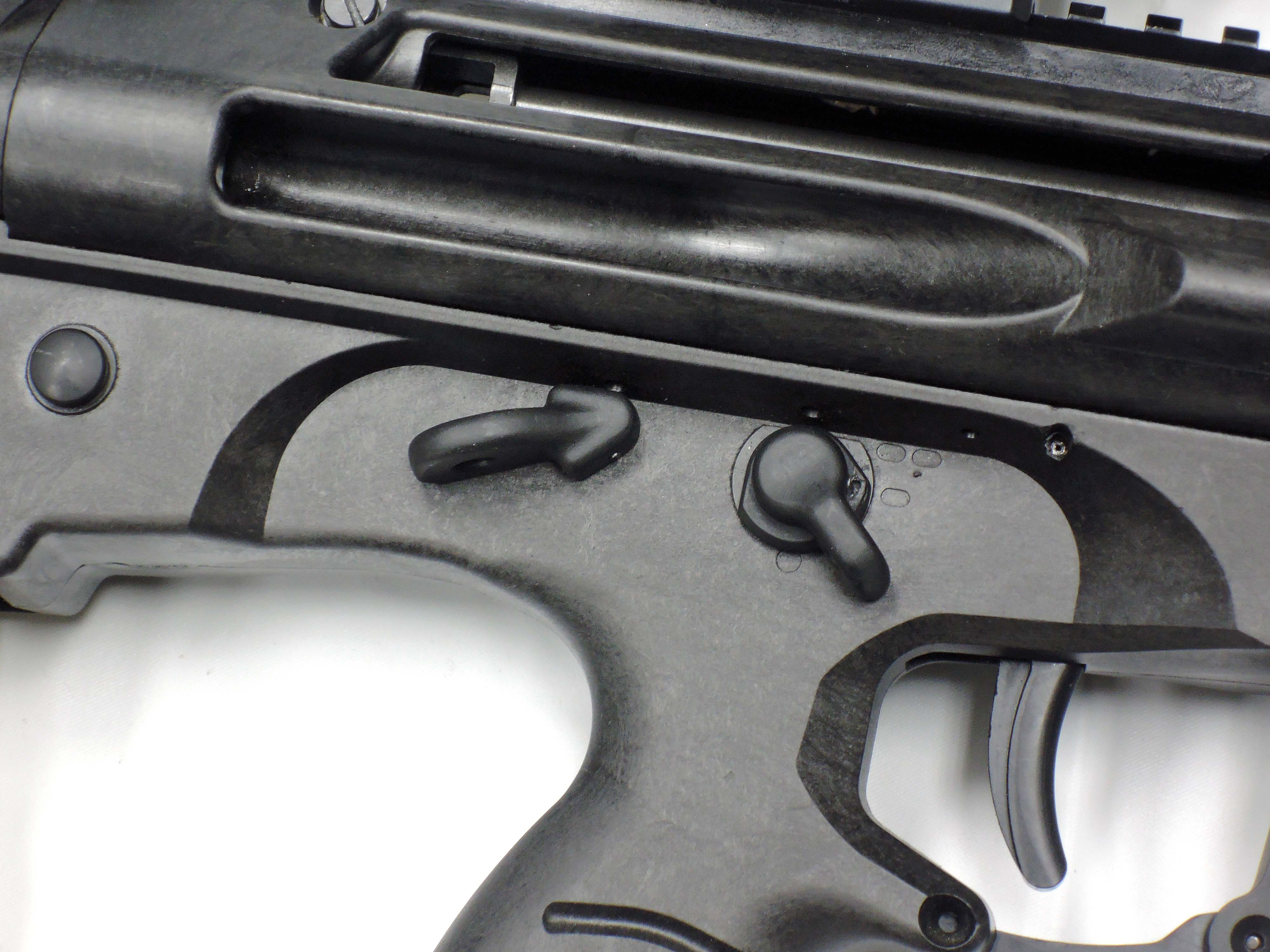
Ejection port, fire selector and magazine release lever on the BR18 rifle

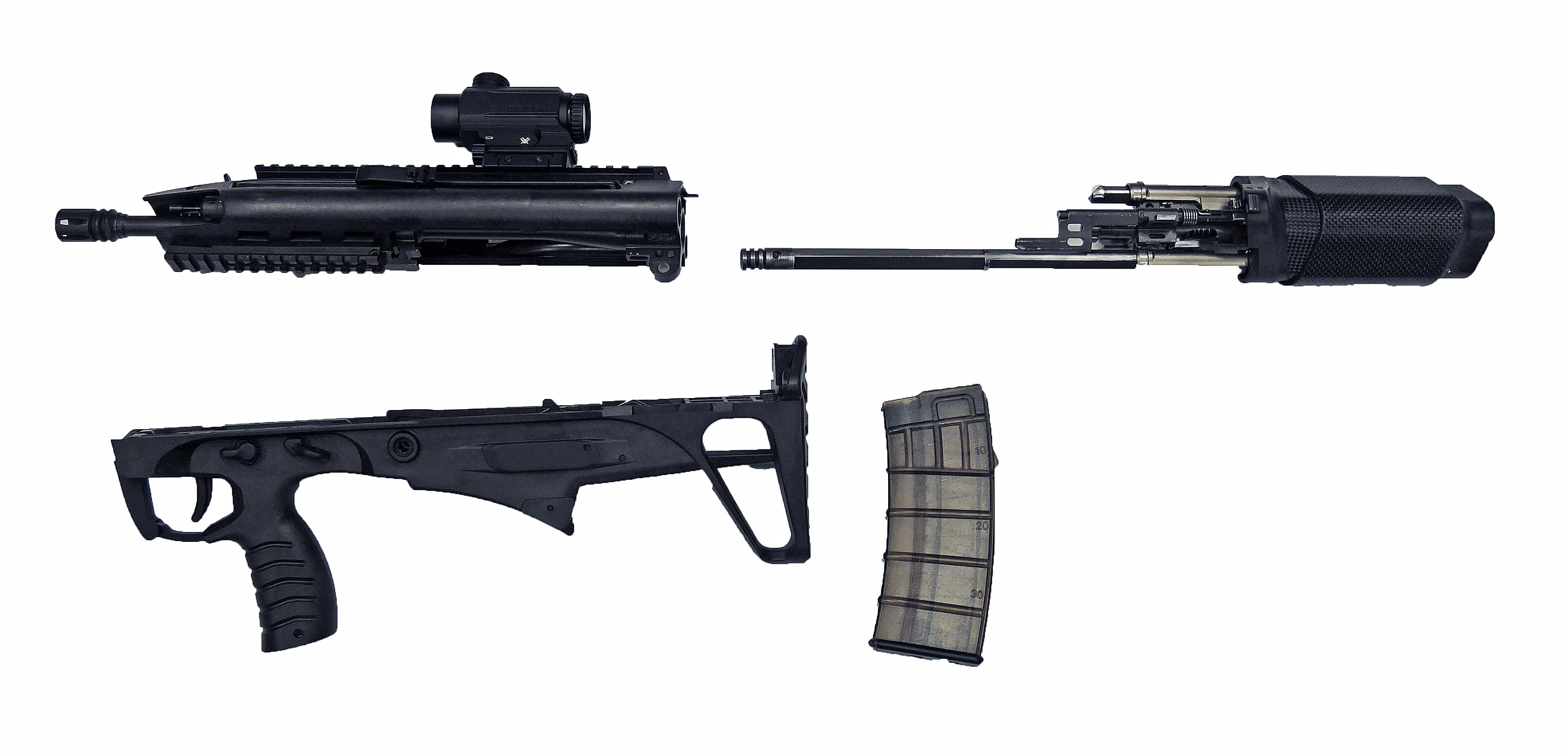
The BR18 rifle, field-stripped

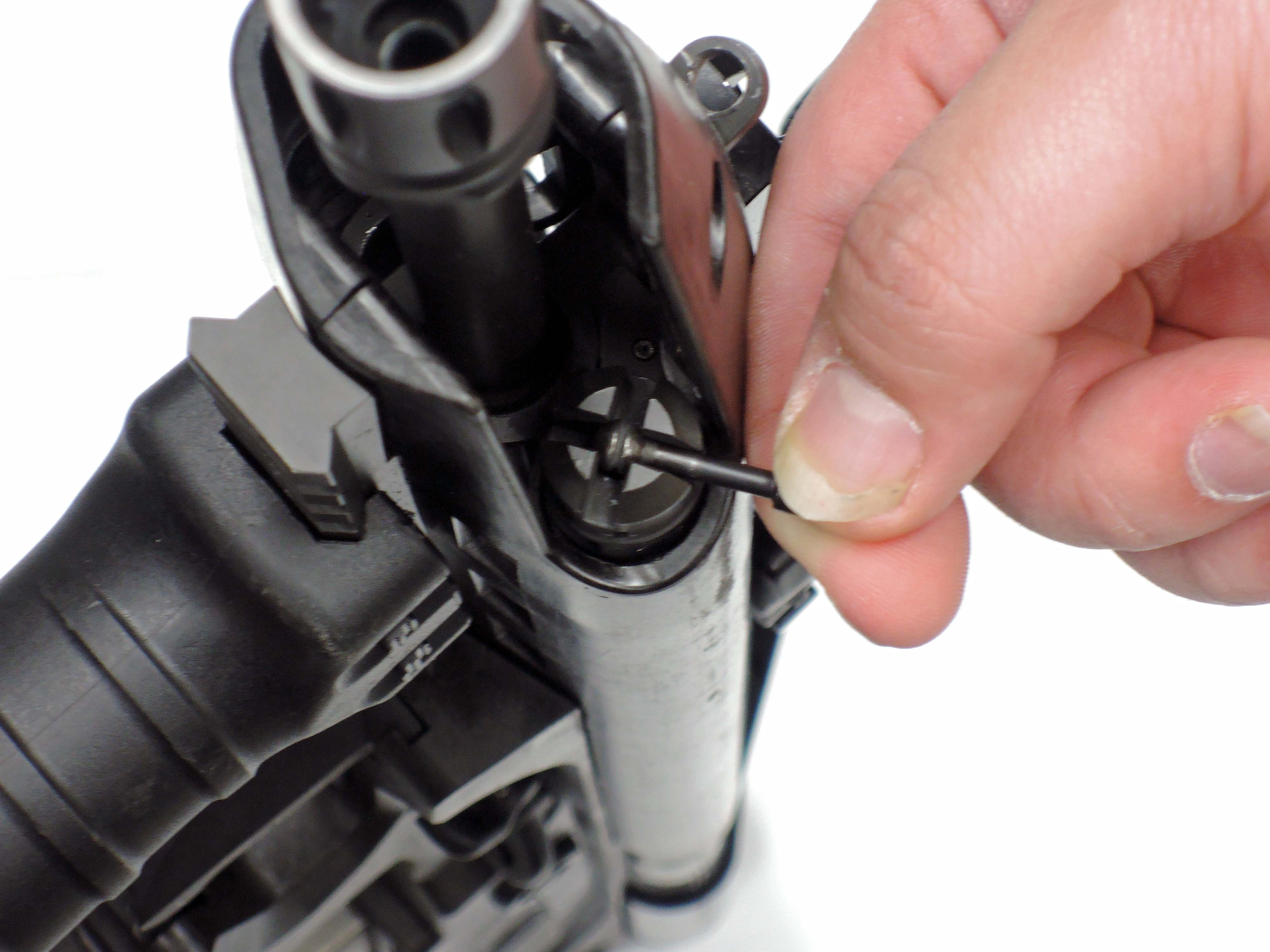
The adjustable and removable gas valve on the BR18 rifle

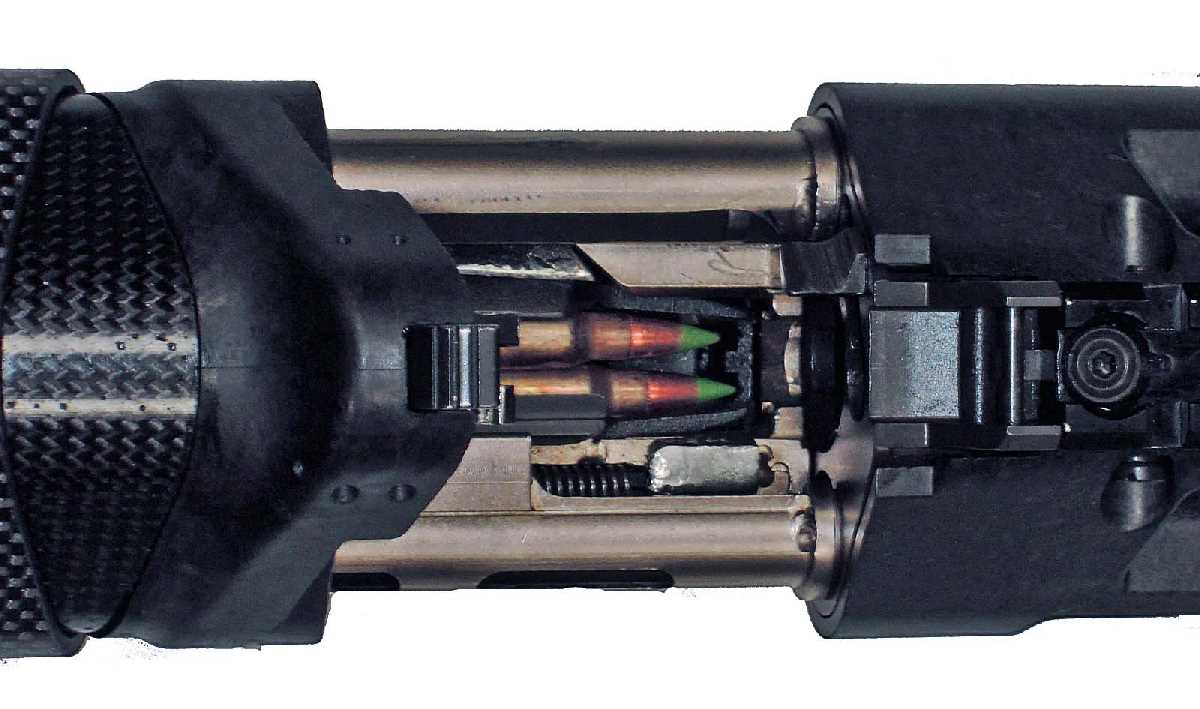
The carbon fiber cheekpiece of the BR18 rifle slides open to provide access to the chamber for troubleshooting

== Variants ==
The BR18 is available in the following configurations:

- Assault rifle: Has an overall length of 645mm with a 14.5 inches (37 cm) barrel.
- Light machine gun: Has a 20 inches (51 cm) barrel.
- Marksman rifle.

== See also ==
- Conventional Multirole Combat Rifle
