= List of serving general and flag officers of the Singapore Armed Forces =

As of 6 September 2026, the Singapore Armed Forces (SAF) has one three-star admiral, four two-star generals / admirals and 32 one-star generals, one-star admirals or equivalent.

== Chiefs of Armed Services ==
Position	Rank and name	Photo	Date of rank	Vocation	Decorations	Service branch	Ref
Chief of Defence Force (CDF)	Vice Admiral; Aaron Beng Yao Cheng		1 July 2023 (Note: Assumed office of CDF on 24 March 2023 but was promoted to vice admiral on 1 July 2023.)	Naval Officer	PJG, PPA(E), PPA(G), PBS	Republic of Singapore Navy	
Chief of Digital and Intelligence Service (CDI) / Director, Military Intelligence	Major-General; Lee Yi-Jin		1 July 2023 (Note: Assumed office of CDI on 28 October 2022 but was promoted to major-general on 1 July 2023.)	Artillery	PPA(E) (COVID-19), PPA(E), PPA(G), PBS	Digital and Intelligence Service	
Chief of Navy (CNV)	Rear Admiral; Sean Wat Jianwen		1 January 2024 (Note: Assumed office of CNV on 10 March 2023 but was promoted to rear admiral (two-star) on 1 January 2024.)	Naval Officer	PPA(E), PPA(G)	Republic of Singapore Navy	
Chief of Air Force (CAF)	Major-General; Kelvin Fan Sui Siong		1 July 2024 (Note: Assumed office of CAF on 22 March 2024 but was promoted to major-general on 1 July 2024.)	Air Warfare Officer (Air Defence Weapons)	PPA(E), PPA(P), PBS	Republic of Singapore; Air Force	
Chief of Army (COA)	Major-General; Cai Dexian		1 July 2025 (Note: Assumed office of COA on 21 March 2025 but was promoted to major-general on 1 July 2025.)	Armour	PPA(G)	Singapore Army	

== Ministry of Defence/Joint Staff ==
Rank	Name	Position	Vocation	Date of rank	Decorations	Service branch	Ref
Brigadier-General
Brigadier-General	Choo Wei Yee, Frederick	Deputy Secretary (Policy)	Armour	1 July 2019	PPA(E), PPA(G), PBS	Singapore Army	
Brigadier-General	Tan Tiong Keat	Group Chief (Service Delivery)	Combat Engineers	1 July 2021	PPA(P), PPA(G), PK (COVID-19), PBS	Singapore Army	
Brigadier-General	Chan Ching Hao	Chief of Staff - Joint Staff / SAF Inspector-General / Chief Sustainability Officer	Pilot (Fighter)	1 July 2021	PPA(E), PPA(G), PBS	Republic of Singapore Air Force	
Brigadier-General	Yeo Tze Kuan, Amos	Group Chief, Policy & Strategy / Group Chief, Plans and Transformation	Air Warfare Officer (Air Traffic Control)	1 July 2022	PPA(P), PBS	Republic of Singapore Air Force	
Brigadier-General	Narayanan Letchumanan	Director of Joint Operations	Military Intelligence	1 July 2023	PPA(G), PBS	Digital and Intelligence Service	
Brigadier-General	Kwan Hon Chuong	Commandant, SAFTI Military Institute	Naval Officer	1 July 2024	PPA(P), PPA(G), PBS	Republic of Singapore Navy	
Brigadier-General	Joseph Peh Chin Leong	Director, Military Security Department	Air Warfare Officer (Air Defence Weapons)	1 July 2025	PPA(P), PK (COVID-19), PBS	Republic of Singapore Air Force	
Brigadier-General	Yap Chin Teck Daxson	Director, Defence Policy Office	Air Warfare Officer (Air Defence Weapons)	1 July 2026	PPA(P), PK (COVID-19)	Republic of Singapore Air Force	
Brigadier-General	Kam Kai Qing	Head, Joint Intelligence	Pilot (Helicopter) / Military Intelligence	1 July 2026	PPA(P)	Republic of Singapore Air Force	

== Singapore Army ==
Rank	Name	Position	Vocation	Date of rank	Decorations	Service branch	Ref
Brigadier-General
Brigadier-General	Low Wilson	In transit	Commandos	1 July 2022	PPA(P), PPA(G), PK (COVID-19), PBS	Singapore Army	
Brigadier-General	Pang Lead Shuan	Commander, Training and Doctrine Command	Infantry	1 July 2023	PPA(P), PPA(G), PBS	Singapore Army	
Brigadier-General	Wong Shi Ming	Chief of Staff - General Staff / Army Sustainability Officer	Infantry	1 July 2024	PPA(G)	Singapore Army	
Brigadier-General	Lim Han Yong	Assistant Chief of the General Staff (Operations)	Armour	1 July 2025	PPA(P), PBS	Singapore Army	
Brigadier-General	Wong Pui Chuan	Chief Guards Officer / Commander, 21st Division / Joint Task Force	Guards	1 July 2025	PPA(G), PBS	Singapore Army	
Brigadier-General	Fairoz Bin Hassan	Commander, 9th Division / Chief Infantry Officer	Guards	1 July 2025	PPA(G), PBS	Singapore Army	
Brigadier-General	Tjioe Jin Kiat Alvin	Commander, Special Operations Task Force / Chief Commando Officer	Commandos	1 July 2026	PPA(G), PBS	Singapore Army	
Brigadier-General	Chong Shi Hao	Commander, 3rd Division	Armour	1 July 2026	PPA(G) (COVID-19), PPA(G)	Singapore Army	
Military Expert 8	Tan Mu Yen	Commander, Combat Service Support Command / Deputy Army Sustainability Officer	Army Engineer	1 July 2025	PPA(P), PBS	Singapore Army	

== Republic of Singapore Navy ==
Rank	Name	Position	Vocation	Date of rank	Decorations	Service branch	Ref
Rear Admiral	Lim Kian Hua Augustine	Chief of Staff, Naval Staff / Navy Sustainability Officer	Naval Officer	1 July 2023	PPA(P), PPA(G) (COVID-19), PBS	Republic of Singapore Navy	
Rear Admiral	Ng Xun Xi	Commander, Maritime Security (MARSEC) Command / Maritime Security Task Force (MSTF)	Naval Officer	1 July 2025	PPA(G), PBS	Republic of Singapore Navy	
Military Expert 8	Khoo Koh Giok	Head, Naval Engineering & Logistics Department / Deputy Navy Sustainability Officer	Naval Warfare System Engineer	1 July 2026	PPA(P), PBS	Republic of Singapore Navy	

== Republic of Singapore Air Force ==
Rank	Name	Position	Vocation	Date of rank	Decorations	Service branch	Ref
Brigadier-General	Ho Kum Luen	Chief of Staff, Air Staff / Air Sustainability Officer	Pilot (Fighter)	1 July 2019	PPA(P) (COVID-19), PPA(P), PPA(G), PBS	Republic of Singapore Air Force	
Brigadier-General	Teo Soo Yeow	Commander, Air Combat Command	Pilot (Fighter)	1 July 2023	PPA(P), PPA(G), PBS	Republic of Singapore Air Force	
Brigadier-General	Phua Jia Kai	Head, Air Operations Department	Air Warfare Officer (Air Battle Management)	1 July 2024	PPA(P), PK (COVID-19)	Republic of Singapore Air Force	
Brigadier-General	Xu Geyuan Marcel	Commander, Participation Command / RSAF Chief Innovation Officer	Pilot (Helicopter) / Military Intelligence	1 July 2025	PPA(P), PBS	Republic of Singapore Air Force	
Brigadier-General	Sebastian Chai Gao Jun	Commander, Air Power Generation Command	Pilot (Fighter) / Military Intelligence	1 July 2026	PPA(G)	Republic of Singapore Air Force	

== Digital and Intelligence Service ==
Rank	Name	Position	Vocation	Date of rank	Decorations	Service branch	Ref
Brigadier-General
Brigadier-General	Xu Youfeng	In transit	Infantry	1 July 2022	PPA(P), PBS	Digital and Intelligence Service	
Brigadier-General	Wong Hong Kai	Head, DIS Operations	Pilot (Transport)	1 July 2024	PPA(P), PPA(G), PBS	Digital and Intelligence Service	
Brigadier-General	Clarence Cai Geren	Commander, Defence Cyber Command / Cybersecurity Task Force / Defence Cyber Chief	Infantry	1 July 2026	PPA(G), PBS	Digital and Intelligence Service	
Brigadier-General	John Nehemiah Samuel	Commander, Joint Intelligence Command	UAV Pilot	1 July 2026	PPA(P)	Digital and Intelligence Service	
Rear Admiral	Yong Wei Hsiung	Chief of Staff – Digital and Intelligence Staff / DIS Sustainability Officer	Naval Officer	1 July 2020	PPA(P), PBS	Digital and Intelligence Service	

== Others ==
The following table comprises general officers who are currently not in the Ministry of Defence but are still in service.

Rank	Name	Position	Vocation	Date of rank	Decorations	Service branch	Ref
Brigadier-General	Lim Kok Hong	Defence Attache, Washington	Pilot (Fighter)	1 July 2021	PPA(P), PBS	Republic of Singapore Air Force	

== Other one-star billets ==
The following table comprise appointments typically held by a one-star officer but are currently held by a colonel or Military Expert 7. Officers in these positions are expected to promote to brigadier-general, rear admiral or Military Expert 8.

Rank	Name	Position	Vocation	Date of appointment	Decorations	Service branch	Ref
Colonel
Colonel	Kwek Kian Leong	Commander, 6th Division / Headquarters Sense and Strike	Artillery	3 October 2025	PPA(G)	Singapore Army	
Colonel	Muhammad Helmi Bin Khaswan	Commander, 2nd People's Defence Force Command / Island Defence Task Force	Infantry	March 2026	PPA(G)	Singapore Army	
Colonel	(DR) Tan Zhong Wei, Mark	Chief of Medical Corps	Medical Officer	March 2026	PPA(P), PPA(G) (COVID-19)	Singapore Army	
Colonel	Yik Yen Dean	Chief Armour Officer / Commander, 25th Division	Armour	4 September 2026	PPA(G), PK (COVID-19), PBS	Singapore Army	
Colonel	Ooi Tjin-Kai	Head, Naval Operations Department	Naval Officer	November 2024	PPA(P), PPA(G), PBS	Republic of Singapore Navy	
Colonel	Ang Chun Hou, Bertram	Fleet Commander	Naval Officer	15 May 2026	PPA(G)	Republic of Singapore Navy	
Colonel	Ng Guo Feng	Commander, Air Defence and Operations Command / Air Defence Task Force	Pilot (Transport)	17 October 2025	PPA(P)	Republic of Singapore Air Force	
Colonel	Mikail Kalimuddin	Commander, Digital Defence Command	Artillery	31 July 2026	PPA(G), PK (COVID-19)	Digital and Intelligence Service	
Military Expert 7
Military Expert 7	Gabriel Tham Chi Mun	Head, Air Engineering & Logistics Department / Deputy Air Sustainability Officer	Air Force Engineer	January 2025	PPA(G), PBS	Republic of Singapore Air Force	
Military Expert 7	Guo Jinghua	Commander, SAF C4 & Digitalisation Command / C4 Task Force	Senior Military Intelligence Expert	18 July 2025	PPA(P), PBS	Digital and Intelligence Service	
