= Kelvin Khong =

Former Singaporean air force general

Kelvin Khong PPA(E) PPA(P) PBS
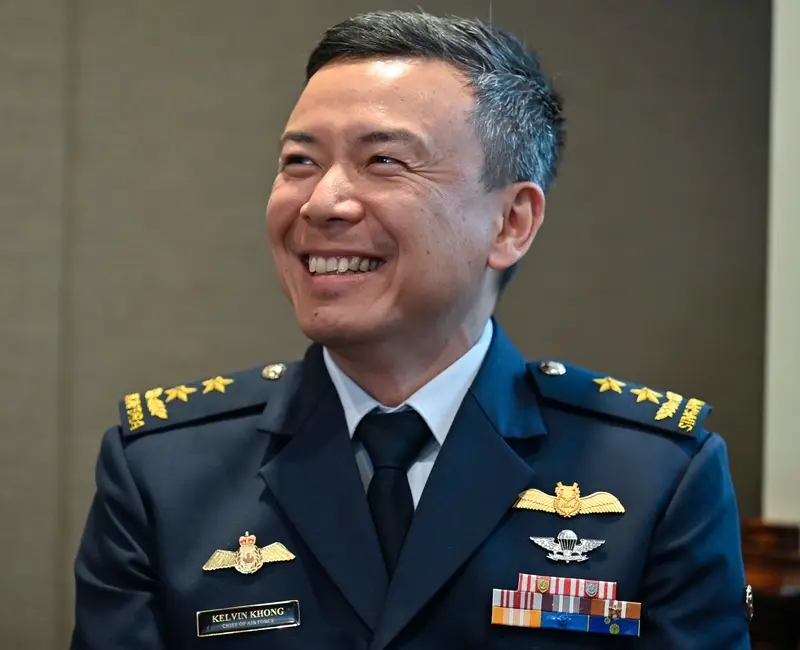
- Khong in 2023
- Born: 18 January 1976 (age 50); Singapore
- Education: Imperial College London (MEng); Air Command and Staff College (MMOAS); International Institute for Management Development (MBA)
- Spouse: Ho Pei Chen
- Children: 3
- Military career
- Allegiance: Singapore
- Branch: Republic of Singapore Air Force
- Service years: 1995–2024
- Rank: Major-General
- Commands: Chief of Air Force; Chief of Staff (Joint Staff); Chief of Staff (Air Staff); Commander, Air Combat Command; Head, Operational Development Group in Air Combat Command; Head, Air Operations; Head, Air Plans; Branch Head, Joint Operations Department; Commanding Officer, 149 Squadron
- Awards: See awards and decorations

Chinese name
- Traditional Chinese: 康文良
- Simplified Chinese: 康文良
- Hanyu Pinyin: Kāng Wénliáng
- IPA: [kʰáŋ.wə̌n.liǎŋ]

Kelvin Khong Boon Leong PPA(E) PPA(P) PBS is a Singaporean former major-general who served as Chief of Air Force from 2019 to 2024.

== Education ==
Khong was educated at Hwa Chong Junior College and attended the flight training programme at Singapore Youth Flying Club, where he was the Best Trainee in Flying upon graduation in 1995.

In 1999, after being awarded the Singapore Armed Forces Overseas Scholarship, Khong graduated from Imperial College London with a Master of Engineering in aeronautical engineering.

Khong also attended the Air Command and Staff College and graduated with a Master of Military Operational Art and Science degree in 2008. He subsequently completed a Master of Business Administration at the International Institute for Management Development in 2012.

== Military career ==
Khong enlisted in the Singapore Armed Forces in 1995 and served as a pilot in the Republic of Singapore Air Force (RSAF), operating the General Dynamics F-16 Fighting Falcon and McDonnell Douglas F-15SG.

During his military career, Khong has held the appointments of Commanding Officer, 149 Squadron; Branch Head, Air Operations Department; Branch Head; Joint Operations Department; Head, Air Plans; Head, Air Operations; Head, Operational Development Group in Air Combat Command; Commander, Air Combat Command; Chief of Staff (Air Staff); and Chief of Staff (Joint Staff).

Khong was promoted from the rank of colonel to brigadier-general on 1 July 2015, and to the rank of major-general on 1 July 2019.

On 22 March 2019, Khong succeeded Mervyn Tan as Chief of Air Force. Under his leadership, the RSAF began the acquisition of the Lockheed Martin F-35 Lightning II, achieved full operational capabilities for the A330 Multi-Role Tanker Transport and the Aster 30 Ground Based Air Defence system, and participated in several Humanitarian Assistance and Disaster Relief missions, such as the bushfire and flood relief operations in Australia, the airlift operations of Afghan evacuees from Qatar to Germany, and the delivery of humanitarian aid to Gaza.

Khong stepped down on 22 March 2024, and was succeeded by Kelvin Fan.

== Awards and decorations ==
- Public Administration Medal (Military) (Gold), in 2020.
- Public Administration Medal (Military) (Silver), in 2014.
- Long Service Medal (Military), in 2020.
- Singapore Armed Forces Long Service and Good Conduct (20 Years) Medal
- Singapore Armed Forces Long Service and Good Conduct (10 Years) Medal with 15 year clasp
- Singapore Armed Forces Good Service Medal
- Ordre national du Mérite (Officier), in 2022.
- Honorary Officer of the Order of Australia, in 2023.
- Bintang Swa Bhuwana Paksa Utama (1st Class), in 2023.
- Commander of the Legion of Merit, in 2023.
- Knight Grand Cross of the Most Noble Order of the Crown, in 2023.
- Courageous Commander of The Most Gallant Order of Military Service (P.G.A.T.)

== Personal life ==
Khong is married to Ho Pei Chen, and has two sons and a daughter.

Military offices
Preceded by Major-General Mervyn Tan	Chief of the Republic of Singapore Air Force; 22 March 2019 – 22 March 2024	Succeeded by Brigadier-General Kelvin Fan Sui Siong
