= Mervyn Tan =

Singaporean major-general (born 1972)

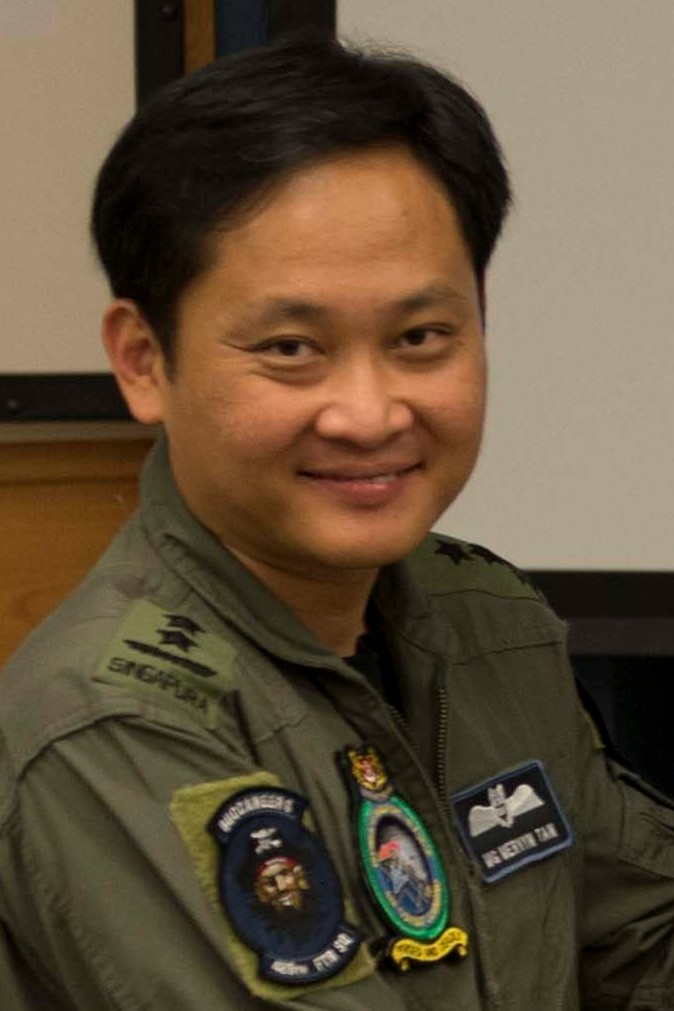
- Tan in 2016
- Born: 1972 (age 53–54); Singapore
- Allegiance: Singapore
- Branch: Republic of Singapore Air Force
- Service years: 1990–2019
- Rank: Major-General
- Commands: Chief of Air Force; Chief of Command, Control, Communications, Computers and Intelligence; Director, Military Intelligence; Commander, Air Defence and Operations Command; Head, Air Plans Department; Commanding Officer, 121 Squadron
- Awards: See awards
- Education: University of Sydney (BEng); United States Air Command and Staff College; MIT Sloan School of Management (MBA)
- Spouse: Gina Yip

Mervyn Tan Wei Ming
- Traditional Chinese: 陳尉民
- Simplified Chinese: 陈尉民
Transcriptions
Standard Mandarin
- Hanyu Pinyin: Chén Wèimín

Mervyn Tan Wei Ming PPA(E) PPA(P) PBS (Chinese: 陈尉民; pinyin: Chén Wèimín) is a Singaporean former major-general who served as Chief of Air Force between 2016 and 2019, being appointed from his prior role of Director of Military Intelligence and Chief Command, Control, Communications, Computers and Intelligence.

He served as the chief executive of Defence Science and Technology Agency between 2021 and 2024, stepping down on 15 May 2024. In the course of his time in DSTA, he was said to have enhanced MINDEF's capabilities across numerous military domains.

He subsequently worked at Vertex Holdings, a venture capital firm, serving as Managing Director Investment responsible for the investment in startups with innovative technologies. Tan was more recently appointed as Group Chief Operating Officer (Technology & Innovation) of ST Engineering, a post he has held since 1 June 2025.

He had also previously served as Deputy Secretary (Technology) and Future Systems and Technology Architect at the Ministry of Defence between 2019 and 2021. In his role as Deputy Secretary (Technology), he played an important role in developing Singapore's technology strategies and cyber capabilities and advanced the cause of capability development for the Singapore Armed Forces.

== Education ==
Tan received the Singapore Armed Forces (SAF) Overseas Training Award (Graduating) in 1992 and graduated from the University of Sydney with a Bachelor of Engineering (First Class Honours) in Aeronautical Engineering in 1996. He attended the United States Air Command and Staff College from 2004 to 2005 and obtained a Master in Operational Art and Science of War. He also achieved the best overall academic and research award for an international officer at the United States Air Command and Staff College.

In 2010, Tan received the SAF Overseas Postgraduate Scholarship (General Development) in 2010 and obtained a Master of Business Administration from the MIT Sloan School of Management in the same year.

== Military career ==
Tan enlisted in the Singapore Armed Forces in 1990 and graduated as an Air Force (RSAF) officer from the Officer Cadet School in 1991. As an operational pilot, Tan has participated in overseas exercises in Australia, Brunei, India, Indonesia, Malaysia, the Philippines and Thailand. Throughout his military career, he held various appointments, including Commanding Officer of 121 Squadron, Head of the Air Plans Department from 2008 to 2010, and Commander of Air Defence and Operations Command (ADOC) from 2012 to 2014. He served as Director of Military Intelligence (DMI) - in which time he was said to have played a pivotal role in the deployment of the military resources to battle terrorism, and Chief of Command, Control, Communications, Computers and Intelligence (C4I) from February 2014 to February 2016.

Tan succeeded Hoo Cher Mou as the Chief of Air Force on 28 March 2016. Tan was promoted to the rank of Major-General on 1 July 2016. He stepped down as Chief of Air Force on 22 March 2019 after three years in that position, with Kelvin Khong replacing him. In his time as Chief of Air Force, he was said to have "guided the RSAF's transformation to support the Next Generation SAF".

== Awards ==
- Public Administration Medal (Military) (Gold), in 2017.
- Public Administration Medal (Military) (Silver), in 2010.
- Long Service Medal (Military), in 2016.
- Singapore Armed Forces Long Service and Good Conduct (20 Years) Medal
- Singapore Armed Forces Long Service and Good Conduct (10 Years) Medal with 15 year clasp
- Singapore Armed Forces Good Service Medal
- United States Legion of Merit (Commander Degree), in 2020, for strengthening defence relations between the United States and Singapore.

== Personal life ==
Tan is married to Gina Yip and has one son and one daughter.

Military offices
Preceded by Major-General Hoo Cher Mou	Chief of the Republic of Singapore Air Force; 28 March 2016 – 22 March 2019	Succeeded by Brigadier-General Kelvin Khong Boon Leong
