= Sean Wat =

Singaporean naval officer

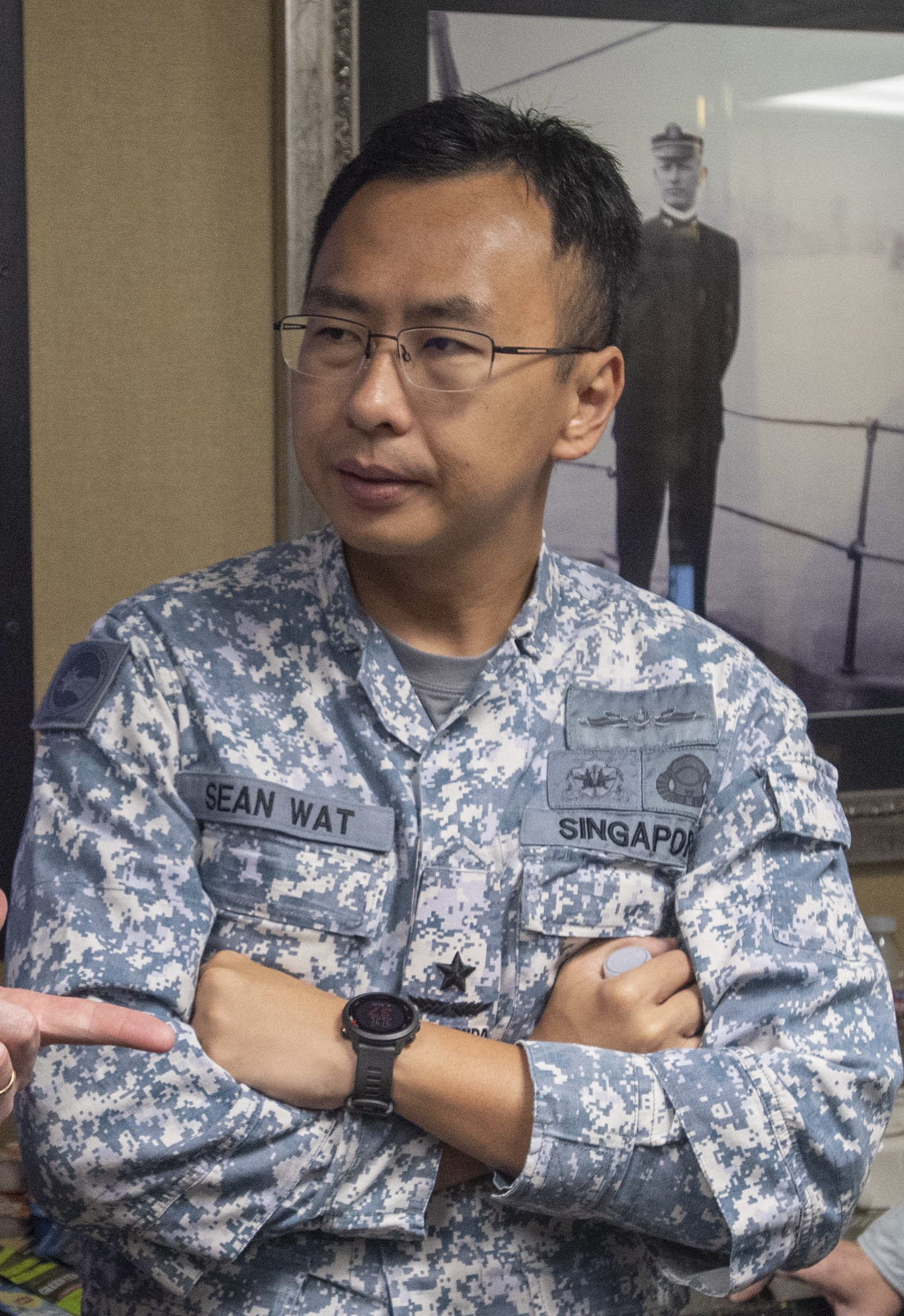
- Wat in 2023
- Born: 1984 (age 41–42); Singapore
- Education: Stanford University (BASc)
- Military career
- Allegiance: Singapore
- Branch: Republic of Singapore Navy
- Service years: 2002–present
- Rank: Rear-Admiral
- Commands: Chief of Navy (2023–present); Fleet Commander; Director, Defence Policy Office; Deputy Commander, Maritime Security Task Force; Commanding Officer, Formidable-class frigate RSS Supreme

Sean Wat Jianwen PPA(E) PPA(P) (Chinese: 屈坚文) is a Singaporean two-star rear-admiral who has been serving as Chief of Navy since 2023.

== Education ==
Wat attended Raffles Institution. Wat was awarded the Singapore Armed Forces Overseas Scholarship to study at Stanford University, where he graduated with a Bachelor of Arts and Science degree in Mathematics and Philosophy, and a Master of Science degree in Management Science and Engineering in 2006.

From 2013 to 2014, Wat attended the United States Naval Command and Staff Course, held at the Naval War College. In 2019, Wat earned a Master of Business Administration from the Massachusetts Institute of Technology.

== Military career ==
Wat enlisted into the SAF in 2002. He served as Commanding Officer of the Formidable-class frigate RSS Supreme from 2014 to 2016, and later Head, Force Transformation Office, Joint Plans and Transformation Department in the Ministry of Defence (MINDEF) from 2016 to 2018.

From 2019 to 2020, Wat served as Deputy Commander of the Maritime Security Task Force. He also served as Director of the Defence Policy Office under MINDEF from 2021 to 2022, before becoming Fleet Commander from 2022-2023.

In 2023, Wat was appointed as Chief of Navy.

== Awards and decorations ==
- Pingat Pentadbiran Awam, Emas (Tentera) (Public Administration Medal, Gold (Military))
- Pingat Pentadbiran Awam, Gangsa (Tentera) (Public Administration Medal, Bronze (Military))
- Singapore Armed Forces Long Service and Good Conduct (20 Years) Medal
- Singapore Armed Forces Long Service and Good Conduct (10 Years) Medal with 15 year clasp
- Singapore Armed Forces Good Service Medal
- Singapore Armed Forces Overseas Service Medal
- Bintang Jalasena Utama (Navy Meritorious Service Star, 1st Class) in 2025

Military offices
Preceded by Aaron Beng	Chief of Navy; 10 March 2023 – present	Incumbent
