= Melvyn Ong =

Singaporean military officer

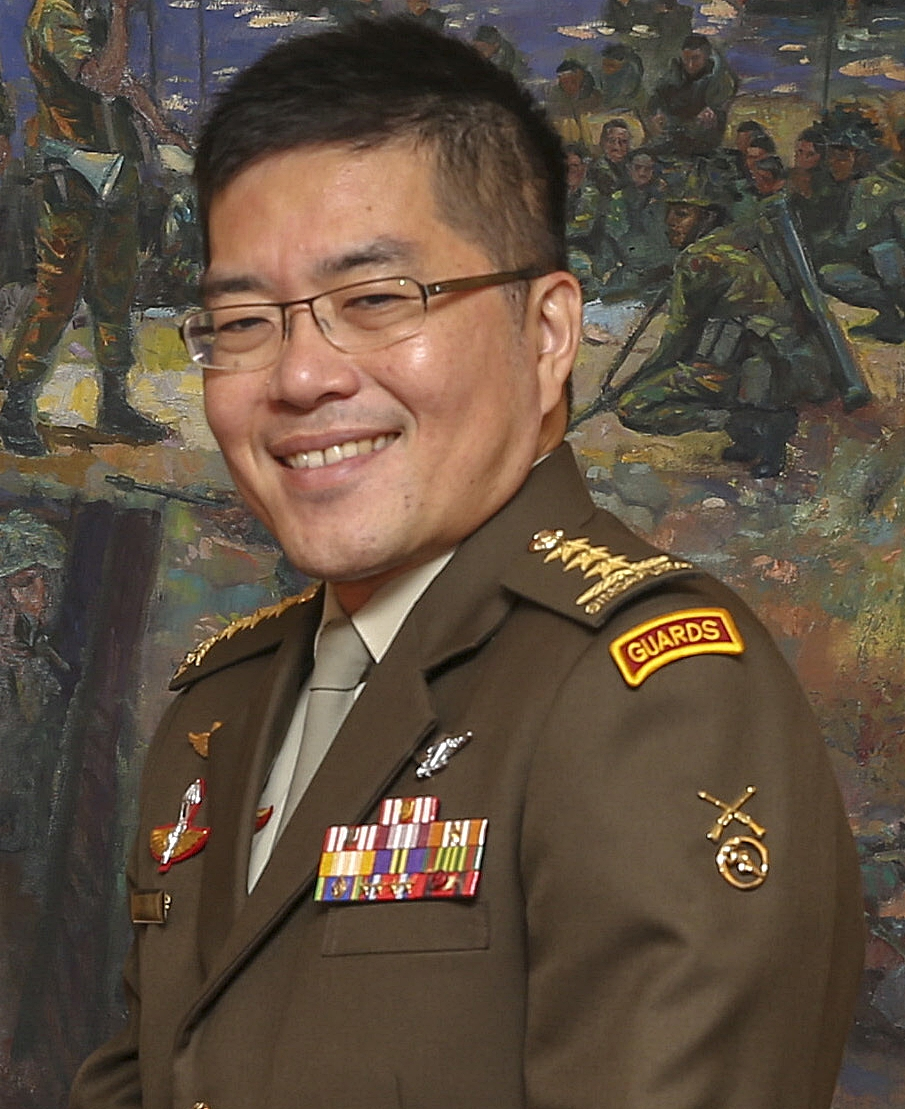
- Ong in 2019
- Born: 1975 (age 50–51); Singapore
- Allegiance: Singapore
- Branch: Singapore Army
- Service years: 1994–2023
- Rank: Lieutenant-General
- Commands: Chief of Defence Force; Chief of Army; Chief Guards Officer; Head, Joint Plans and Transformation Department; Commander, 7th Singapore Infantry Brigade
- Education: London School of Economics (BS, MS)

Melvyn Ong Su Kiat
- Simplified Chinese: 王赐吉
Transcriptions
Standard Mandarin
- Hanyu Pinyin: Wáng Cìjí

Melvyn Ong Su Kiat PJG PPA(E) PPA(P) (born 1975) is a Singaporean retired lieutenant-general who served as Chief of Defence Force between 2018 and 2023.

== Education ==
Ong was educated at Anglo-Chinese School (Independent) and National Junior College, before being awarded the Singapore Armed Forces (SAF) Overseas Scholarship in 1994 to study at the London School of Economics, where he graduated with a Bachelor of Science with second class honours degree. He also completed a Master of Science degree in economics at the London School of Economics in 1998.

Ong attended the Indonesian Army Command and General Staff College in Bandung in 2005. He also completed the United States Army's Infantry Officer Course in Fort Benning, Georgia in 1998.

== Military career ==
Ong enlisted in the Singapore Armed Forces (SAF) in January 1994 and was commissioned as an infantry officer in October that year.

Ong has held various appointments in the SAF, including the Commander of the 7th Singapore Infantry Brigade from 2010 to 2011, and Head of the Joint Plans and Transformation Department.

In 2011, Ong led the Singapore team which assisted in rescue operations and provided humanitarian aid to the victims of the 2011 Christchurch earthquake in New Zealand, and helped to establish the Changi Regional Humanitarian Assistance and Disaster Relief Coordination Centre in 2014. He was also Chairman of the 2015 National Day Parade Executive Committee.

Ong served as Chief Guards Officer from 18 June 2014 to 14 August 2015. He succeeded Perry Lim as Chief of Army on 14 August 2015, and was promoted to the rank of Major-General on 1 July 2016. He served in that position until 21 March 2018.

Ong was appointed Chief of Defence Force on 23 March 2018, and was promoted to the rank of Lieutenant-General on 1 July 2018. He served in that position until 24 March 2023, where he was succeeded by Aaron Beng.

== Non-military career ==
In addition to his career in the SAF, Ong is also serving in the Singapore Administrative Service under the Dual Career Scheme. He was Deputy Chief Executive Officer of the Early Childhood Development Agency between 2013 and 2014.

He became the Permanent Secretary for Defence Development at the Ministry of Defence on 1 June 2023, succeeding Chan Heng Kee. On 1 January 2024, he had also assumed the role of Permanent Secretary (Development) at the Ministry of National Development.

== Awards and decorations ==
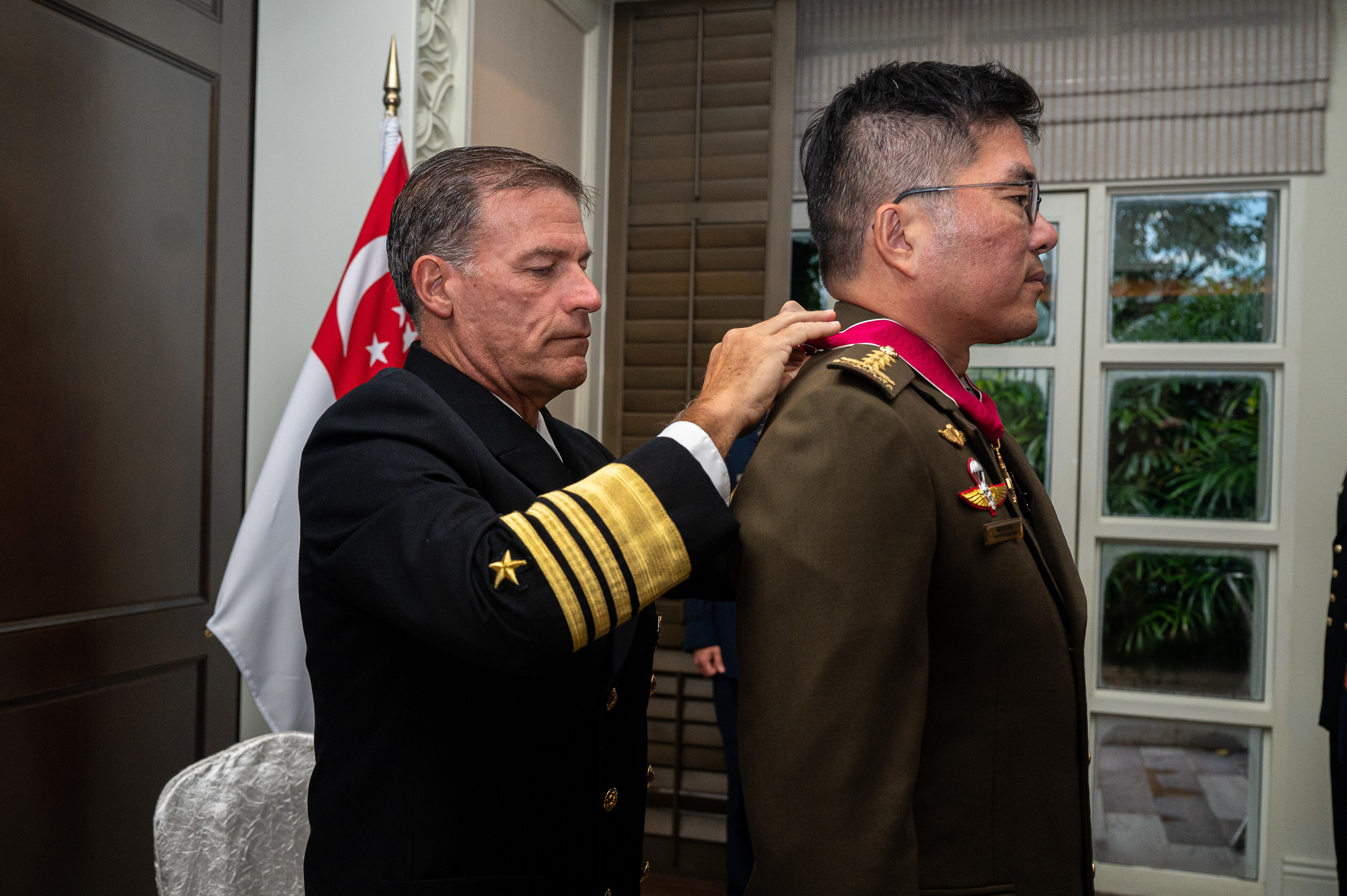
Ong is awarded the Commander of the Legion of Merit by Admiral John C. Aquilino, commander, United States Indo-Pacific Command on June 1, 2023.

Lieutenant-General Ong has received the following awards:

- Meritorious Service Medal (Military) - PJG
- Public Administration Medal, (Gold) (Military) - PPA(E)
- Public Administration Medal, (Silver) (Military) - PPA(P)
- Long Service Medal (Military)
- Singapore Armed Forces Long Service and Good Conduct (20 Years) Medal
- Singapore Armed Forces Long Service and Good Conduct (10 Years) Medal with 15 year clasp
- Singapore Armed Forces Good Service Medal
- Singapore Armed Forces Overseas Service Medal
- Knight Grand Cross of the Order of the White Elephant
- Knight Grand Cross of the Order of the Crown of Thailand
- Grand Meritorious Military Order Star, 1st Class - Indonesia
- Army Meritorious Service Star, 1st Class - Indonesia
- Courageous Commander of The Most Gallant Order of Military Service (P.G.A.T.)
- The Most Exalted Order of Paduka Keberanian Laila Terbilang, 1st Class (D.P.K.T.)
- Officer (Military division) of the Order of Australia (A.O.)
- Commander of the Legion of Merit, USA

== Personal life ==
Ong is married to Nicole Lynn McCully and they have three children.

Military offices
Preceded by Lieutenant-General Perry Lim	10th Chief of Defence Force; 23 March 2018 - 24 March 2023	Succeeded by Rear-Admiral Aaron Beng
Preceded by Major-General Perry Lim	Chief of the Singapore Army; 14 August 2015 – 21 March 2018	Succeeded by Brigadier-General Goh Si Hou
