= Singapore Armed Forces National Service Medal =

SAF National Service Medal
- Ribbon
- Type: Medal
- Awarded for: 10 years service
- Presented by: Singapore
- Eligibility: National Servicemen of the Singapore Armed Forces
- Clasps: 'Fifteen Years'
- Status: Active
- Ribbon with 15 year clasp

Precedence
- Next (higher): SAF Long Service and Good Conduct (20 Years) Medal
- Next (lower): SAF Good Service Medal
- Related: SAF Long Service and Good Conduct (10 Years) Medal

The Singapore Armed Forces National Service Medal is an award conferred on a National Serviceman (NSman) of the Singapore Armed Forces (SAF) who has completed an equivalent 10 years of active service. This is achieved by meaningfully and satisfactorily completed 7 High-Key In-Camp Trainings over 10 ORNS (Operationally Ready National Service) cycles.

Regular members of the SAF qualify for an equivalent medal, the Singapore Armed Forces Long Service and Good Conduct (10 Years) Medal.

A clasp is awarded for an additional equivalent 5 years of service, for a total of 15 years. This is met by the full NSTS - 8 High-Key In-Camp Trainings and 5 Low-Key In-Camp Trainings.

== Description ==
- The ribbon is red, with three central white stripes.

== Service medals ==
In the SAF National Service, the medals for service are:

- 5 years - Singapore Armed Forces Good Service Medal
- 10 years - Singapore Armed Forces National Service Medal
- 15 years - Singapore Armed Forces National Service Medal with 15 year clasp
- 20 years - Singapore Armed Forces Long Service and Good Conduct (20 Years) Medal
- 25 years - Long Service Medal (Military)
- 30 years - Singapore Armed Forces Long Service and Good Conduct (20 Years) Medal with 30 year clasp
