= Ng Chee Meng =

Singaporean politician (born 1968)

The Honourable Ng Chee Meng PJG PPA(E) PPA(G) PBS
- 黄志明
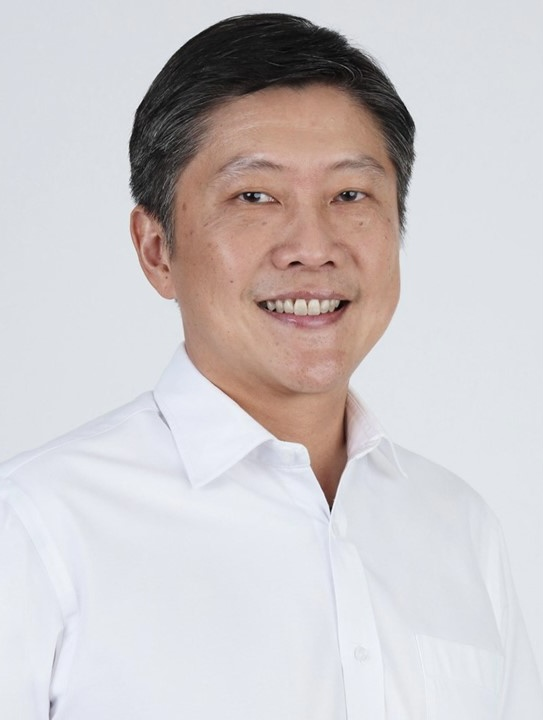
- Official portrait, 2015

Secretary-General of the National Trades Union Congress
- Incumbent
- Assumed office 22 May 2018
- Deputy: Koh Poh Koon; Chee Hong Tat; Heng Chee How; Desmond Tan
- Preceded by: Chan Chun Sing

Minister in the Prime Minister's Office
- Incumbent
- Assumed office 27 July 2026 Serving with Indranee Rajah
- Prime Minister: Lawrence Wong
- Preceded by: Maliki Osman (2025)
- In office 1 May 2018 – 26 July 2020 Serving with Indranee Rajah
- Prime Minister: Lee Hsien Loong
- Preceded by: Chan Chun Sing; Josephine Teo
- Succeeded by: Maliki Osman; Tan See Leng

Minister for Education (Schools)
- In office 1 November 2016 – 30 April 2018; Acting: 1 October 2015 – 31 October 2016 Serving with Ong Ye Kung (2015–2018)
- Prime Minister: Lee Hsien Loong
- Preceded by: Heng Swee Keat (as Minister for Education)
- Succeeded by: Ong Ye Kung (as Minister for Education)

Second Minister for Transport
- In office 1 November 2016 – 30 April 2018
- Prime Minister: Lee Hsien Loong
- Minister: Khaw Boon Wan

Member of the Singapore Parliament for Jalan Kayu SMC
- Incumbent
- Assumed office 3 May 2025
- Preceded by: Constituency established
- Majority: 809 (2.94%)

Member of the Singapore Parliament for Pasir Ris–Punggol GRC
- In office 11 September 2015 – 23 June 2020
- Preceded by: PAP held
- Succeeded by: PAP held
- Majority: 78,513 (45.78%)

Personal details
- Born: 8 August 1968 (age 58) Singapore
- Party: People's Action Party
- Education: United States Air Force Academy (BS); Tufts University (MA)

Military service
- Allegiance: Singapore
- Branch/service: Republic of Singapore Air Force
- Years of service: 1986–2015
- Rank: Lieutenant-General
- Commands: Chief of Defence Force; Chief of Air Force; Deputy Chief of Air Force; Director, Joint Operations; Head, Air Plans; Deputy Head, Joint Communications and Information Systems Department; Commander, Changi Air Base; Commanding Officer, 144 Squadron

Ng Chee Meng (Note: Chinese: 黄志明; Peng'im: Ng^{5} Zi^{3} Mêng^{5}) PJG PPA(E) PPA(G) PBS (born 8 August 1968) is a Singaporean politician, union leader and former lieutenant-general. A member of the governing People's Action Party (PAP), he has been the secretary-general of the National Trades Union Congress (NTUC) since 2018 and the Member of Parliament (MP) for Jalan Kayu Single Member Constituency (SMC) since 2025. He was an MP for Pasir Ris–Punggol Group Representation Constituency (GRC) between 2015 and 2020.

Prior to entering politics, Ng served in the Republic of Singapore Air Force under the Singapore Armed Forces (SAF) between 1986 and 2015, and held the appointments of Chief of Air Force between 2009 and 2013 and Chief of Defence Force between 2013 and 2015. He joined politics in 2015 and left the SAF to contest the 2015 general election.

During his first stint as an MP, Ng served as Minister for Education (Schools) between 2015 and 2018 and Minister in the Prime Minister's Office between 2018 and 2020. In the 2020 general election, he led the PAP team for Sengkang GRC, which lost to the opposition Workers' Party (WP).

In 2020, Ng was co-opted into the PAP's Central Executive Committee (CEC) despite losing his MP seat that year. During his time outside of political office, he remained the Secretary-General of NTUC and was a key proponent of a deal between Income Insurance and Allianz, which was ultimately called off amid intense public backlash. Ng made a political comeback in the 2025 general election, winning the newly formed Jalan Kayu SMC by only 809 votes against WP candidate Andre Low.

On 22 July 2026, Ng was appointed, effective 27 July, to the Cabinet as a Minister in the Prime Minister's Office.

== Education ==
Ng was educated at The Chinese High School and Hwa Chong Junior College, and was awarded the Singapore Armed Forces Overseas Training Award (Graduating) in 1987. He completed a Bachelor of Science in electrical engineering at the United States Air Force Academy in 1991, and graduated from the Singapore Command and Staff College in 1999. In 2002, he obtained a Master of Arts in international relations from The Fletcher School of Law and Diplomacy at Tufts University.

== Military career ==
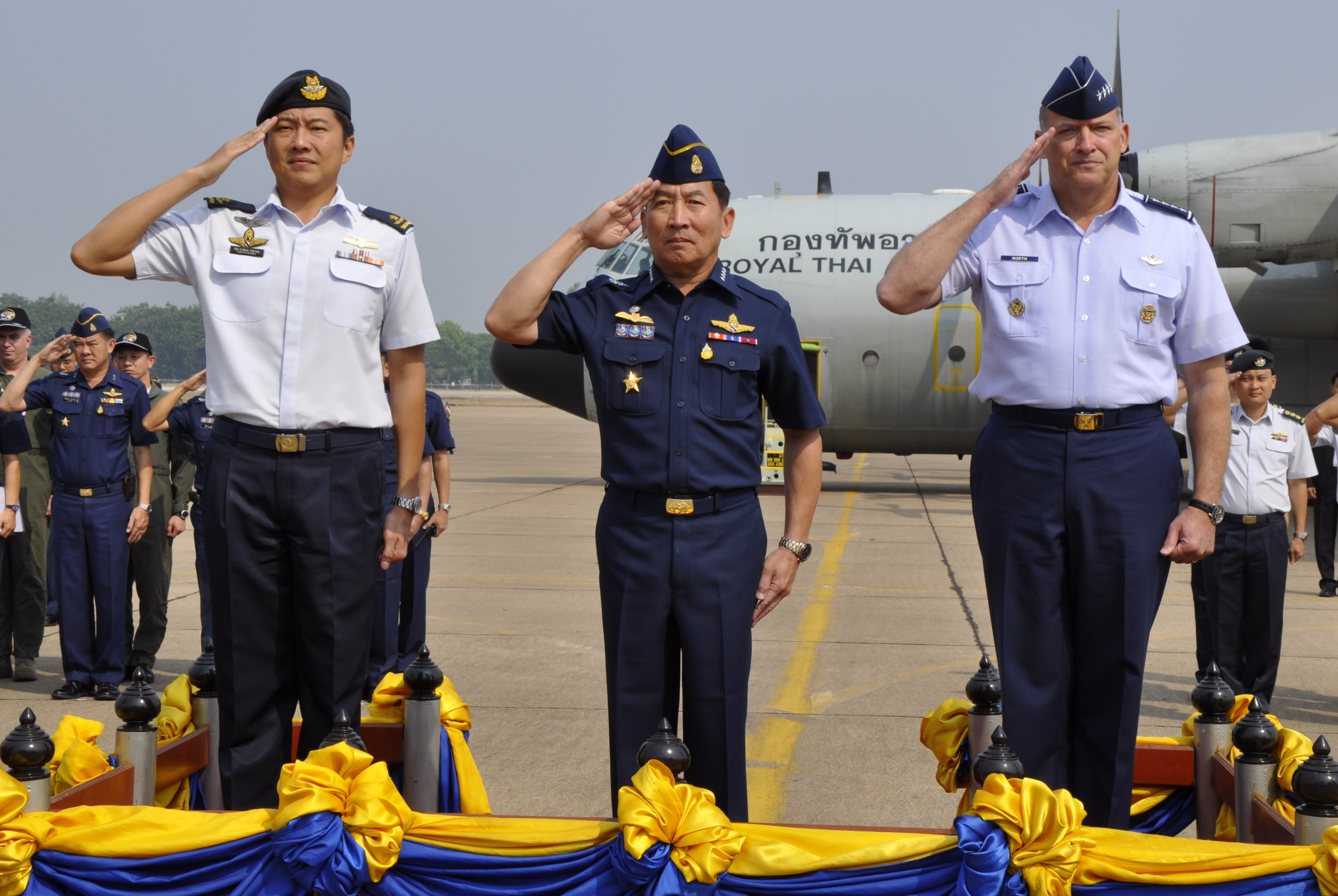
Ng (left) with Itthaporn Subhawong and Gary L. North at Korat Royal Thai Air Force Base in March 2010

Ng enlisted into the Singapore Armed Forces (SAF) in December 1986 and was a fighter pilot in the Republic of Singapore Air Force (RSAF). During his military career, among the appointments he held were: Commanding Officer, 144 Squadron; Commander, Changi Air Base; Deputy Head, Joint Communications and Information Systems Department; Head, Air Plans; Director, Joint Operations; Deputy Chief of Air Force. He was also Military Private Secretary to the Minister for Defence from December 1995 to July 1996.

On 10 December 2009, Ng succeeded his elder brother, Ng Chee Khern, as the Chief of Air Force. He was succeeded by Hoo Cher Mou on 25 March 2013, after his appointment as Chief of Defence Force on 27 March 2013. He was promoted from the rank of Major-General to Lieutenant-General on 27 June 2013. Ng was the second general from the RSAF to be appointed as Chief of Defence Force, after Bey Soo Khiang in 1995.

Ng chaired the organising committee for the state funeral of Singapore's first Prime Minister, Lee Kuan Yew, from 23 to 29 March 2015. He also led the first round of the vigil guard during Lee's lying in state in Parliament House from 25 to 28 March.

Ng retired from the SAF on 18 August 2015 and was succeeded by Perry Lim as Chief of Defence Force.

== Political career ==
=== 2015–2020 ===
On 18 August 2015, Ng announced that he would enter politics after retiring from the Singapore Armed Forces (SAF). On 22 August 2015, the PAP announced that Ng would be part of the six-member PAP team for Pasir Ris–Punggol GRC in the same year's general election. The PAP team won with 72.89% of the vote. Ng was subsequently appointed Acting Minister for Education (Schools), and served as Second Minister for Transport, and Minister for Education (Schools) concurrently from 1 November 2016 to 30 April 2018.

On 23 April 2018, Ng joined the National Trades Union Congress (NTUC) and was appointed Deputy Secretary-General. He was then appointed Minister in the Prime Minister's Office on 1 May 2018. On 22 May 2018, Ng was elected Secretary-General of the NTUC by the NTUC Central Committee.

=== Defeat in Sengkang ===
In the 2020 general election, Ng lost his seat in Parliament after the PAP team he led lost to that of the WP, led by He Ting Ru, in Sengkang GRC by a margin of 4.26%. He also left his positions in the cabinet, but remained Secretary-General of NTUC.

On 19 November 2020, he was co-opted into the PAP's Central Executive Committee (CEC) despite not being a Member of Parliament (MP). This was thought to be due to his role as the Secretary-General of NTUC, which would allow it to be represented in the CEC. On 27 March 2022, Ng was removed from the PAP team for Sengkang GRC.

On 5 August 2024, Ng, in a joint statement with NTUC president K Thanaletchimi, endorsed a deal to sell a controlling 51% stake in NTUC Enterprise subsidiary Income Insurance to Allianz. The statement mentioned that the NTUC Central Committee, which Ng is part of, supported the deal after "full and serious consideration". The Singapore Government announced on 14 October 2024 that it had blocked the deal. The Central Committee later stated that they were unaware of a controversial plan to reduce Income's share capital and return $1.85 billion in cash to shareholders within the first three years after completion of the transaction.

=== Return to Parliament ===
In March and April 2025, Ng was spotted in Fernvale and was later seen making walkabouts and assisting Senior Minister Lee Hsien Loong and Gan Thiam Poh in a Meet-the-People Session in Fernvale, an indication that he might run in the newly formed Jalan Kayu SMC in the upcoming 2025 general election. On 19 April, it was announced that Ng would contest said SMC in the upcoming general election. He proceeded to defeat WP candidate Andre Low with 51.47% of the vote, a majority of 809 votes. Three days after his win, Ng announced that he had asked Prime Minister Lawrence Wong not to offer him any cabinet positions to allow him to "focus on his duties" as an MP and Secretary-General of NTUC.

This request came amid heightened public scrutiny following allegations about his conduct during a Ministry of Education (MOE) dialogue session in 2017, where he was accused of aggressive and patronising behaviour towards teachers. Ng issued a statement on 6 May, stating that he "sincerely [apologised]" and that he "could have handled the situation better". Simultaneously, photos emerged online showing Ng dining with Su Haijin, one of the individuals who was later convicted in a massive money laundering case involving assets worth S$3 billion. Ng claimed that he had no further interactions with Su after learning about the police investigation. Prior to his request, a petition calling for his exclusion from the Cabinet had been made on Change.org and garnered over 25,000 signatures.

On 22 July 2026, Ng was appointed, effective 27 July, to the Cabinet as a Minister in the Prime Minister's Office. Ng has served as the Chairman of the Jalan Kayu Town Council (JKTC) since 2025.

== Personal life ==
Ng is married to Michelle Lim Bee Leng. They have two daughters, Elisabeth and Sara.

Ng has an elder brother, Ng Chee Khern, a former major-general who served as Chief of Air Force between 2006 and 2009, and a younger brother, Ng Chee Peng, a former two-star rear-admiral who served as Chief of Navy between 2011 and 2014. The three brothers are of Teochew descent.

== Awards and decorations ==
- Public Administration Medal (Military) (Bronze), in 2005.
- Public Administration Medal (Military) (Gold), in 2011.
- Long Service Medal (Military), in 2012.
- Meritorious Service Medal (Military), in 2015
- Singapore Armed Forces Long Service and Good Conduct (10 Years) Medal with 15 year clasp
- Singapore Armed Forces Long Service and Good Conduct (20 Years) Medal
- Singapore Armed Forces Good Service Medal
- Knight Grand Cross of the Most Noble Order of the Crown
- Bintang Swa Bhuwana Paksa Utama (1st Class)
- The Most Exalted Order of Paduka Keberanian Laila Terbilang (1st Class)
- Knight Grand Cross of the Most Exalted Order of the White Elephant
- Darjah Panglima Gagah Angkatan Tentera (1st Degree)
- Legion of Honour (Commander)

== Notes and references ==
Political offices
Preceded by Heng Swee Keat as Minister for Education	Minister for Education (Schools); 2016–2018; Acting: 2015 – 2016; Served alongside: Ong Ye Kung (Higher Education and Skills)	Succeeded by Ong Ye Kung as Minister for Education
Preceded by Chan Chun Sing; Josephine Teo	Minister in the Prime Minister’s Office; 2018–2020; Served alongside: Indranee Rajah	Succeeded by Maliki Osman; Tan See Leng
Parliament of Singapore
Preceded by Zainal bin Sapari; Teo Chee Hean; Penny Low; Gan Thiam Poh; Teo Ser Luck; Janil Puthucheary	Member of Parliament for Pasir Ris–Punggol GRC; 2015–2020; Served alongside: Zainal bin Sapari, Teo Chee Hean, Teo Ser Luck, Sun Xueling, Janil Puthucheary	Succeeded by Sharael Taha; Desmond Tan; Teo Chee Hean; Yeo Wan Ling; Janil Puthucheary
New constituency	Member of Parliament for Jalan Kayu SMC; 2025–present	Incumbent
Trade union offices
Preceded by Chan Chun Sing	Secretary-General of the National Trades Union Congress; 2018–present	Incumbent
Military offices
Preceded by Major-General Ng Chee Khern	Chief of the Republic of Singapore Air Force; 10 December 2009–25 March 2013	Succeeded by Brigadier-General Hoo Cher Mou
Preceded by Lieutenant-General Neo Kian Hong	8th Chief of Defence Force; 27 March 2013–18 August 2015	Succeeded by Major-General Perry Lim
