= David Neo =

Singaporean politician

The Honourable David Neo PJG PPA(E) PPA(G) PBS
- 梁振伟
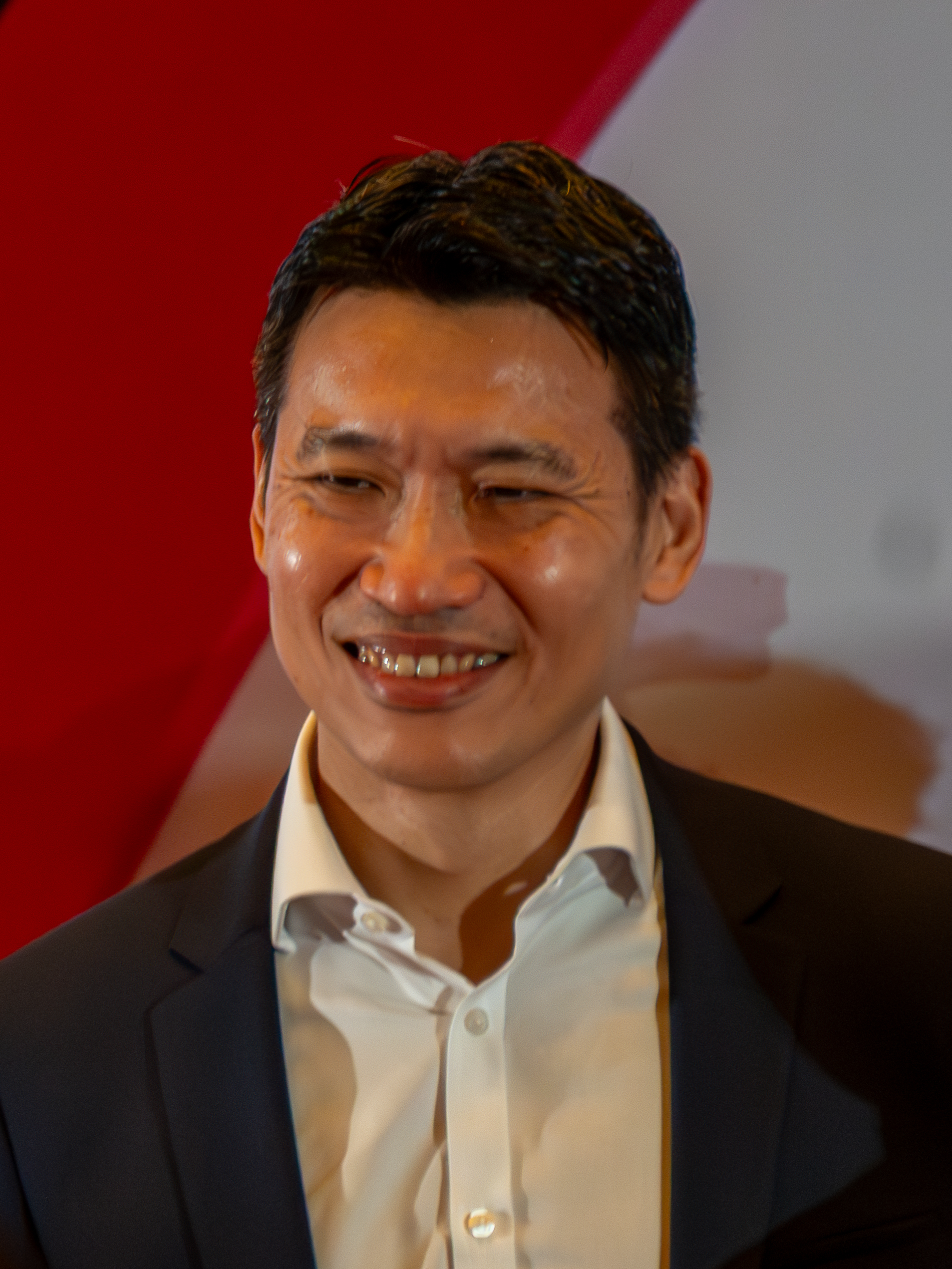
- Neo in 2025

Minister for Culture, Community and Youth
- Incumbent
- Assumed office 27 July 2026; Acting: 23 May 2025 – 27 July 2026
- Prime Minister: Lawrence Wong
- Preceded by: Edwin Tong

Second Minister for Education
- Incumbent
- Assumed office 27 July 2026
- Minister: Desmond Lee
- Preceded by: Maliki Osman (2020)

Member of the Singapore Parliament for Tampines GRC
- Incumbent
- Assumed office 3 May 2025
- Preceded by: PAP held
- Majority: 6,392 (4.65%)

Personal details
- Born: 17 September 1977 (age 48) Singapore
- Party: People's Action Party
- Children: 1
- Education: University of Illinois (BEng, BA); Stanford University (MS); Massachusetts Institute of Technology (MBA)
- Occupation: Politician

Military service
- Allegiance: Singapore
- Branch/service: Singapore Army
- Years of service: 1996–2025
- Rank: Major-General
- Commands: Chief of Army; Deputy Secretary (Technology)/Future Systems and Technology Architect; Director of Joint Operations; Head, Joint Plans and Transformation Department; Commander, 3rd Division; Commander, 2nd Singapore Infantry Brigade; Commanding Officer, 1st Battalion Singapore Guards; Company Commander, 5th Company, 1st Commando Battalion

David Neo Chin Wee (Note: Chinese: 梁振伟; Pe̍h-ōe-jī: Niô͘ Chín-uí) PPA(G) PBS (born 17 September 1977) is a Singaporean politician and former major-general who has been serving as Minister for Culture, Community and Youth, as well as Senior Minister of State for Education since 2025. A member of the governing People's Action Party (PAP), he has been the Member of Parliament (MP) for the Tampines North division of Tampines Group Representation Constituency (GRC) since 2025.

Neo previously served as Chief of Army between 2022 and 2025. Prior to his appointment as Chief of Army, he served as Deputy Secretary for Technology at the Ministry of Defence. Neo was the first Commando to serve as Chief of Army.

== Early life ==
Neo was born in 1977 and was brought up by his uncle and aunt after his mother died when he was five. He attended Victoria School and Victoria Junior College before graduating from the University of Illinois with a Bachelor of Engineering degree with honours in electrical engineering and a Bachelor of Arts degree with distinction in economics.

== Career ==
Neo has been a board member at Temasek Defense Systems Institute since March 2021 and a director at DSTA since April 2021.

=== Military career ===
Neo enlisted into the Singapore Armed Forces (SAF) in 1996 and served in the Singapore Army as a Commando officer.

As Head of Joint Plans and Transformation Department and Director of Joint Operations, he had overseen the SAF's contributions to the national fight against COVID-19.

On 10 March 2022, Neo succeeded Goh Si Hou as the Chief of Army. On 1 July, he was promoted to the rank of Major-General. On 21 March 2025, Neo resigned his position of Chief of Army; he was replaced by Commander of 3rd Singapore Division Cai Dexian.

=== Political career ===
On 12 April 2025, Neo was spotted in Tampines GRC with Masagos Zulkifli, Minister for Social and Family Development. Masagos later said that Neo would be joining the PAP team for the constituency. On 16 April, Neo was confirmed as part of the PAP team for Tampines GRC for the 2025 general election.

On Election Day, the PAP team defeated the Workers' Party (WP), National Solidarity Party (NSP) and the People's Power Party (PPP) with 52.02% of the vote. The WP received 47.37% of the vote; the other two parties lost their election deposits of S$67,500 ($13,500 per candidate) for not winning at least 12.5% of the vote.

After the election, Neo was internally assigned to the Tampines North division.

On 23 May 2025, he was appointed Acting Minister for Culture, Community and Youth, and Senior Minister of State for Education. On 22 July 2026, Prime Minister Lawrence Wong announced that Neo would be appointed as Minister for Culture, Community and Youth, and Second Minister for Education from 27 July 2026.

== Controversies ==
=== Comment on Hong Kong players ===
On 18 November 2025, Singapore secured a 2–1 victory over Hong Kong in the 2027 AFC Asian Cup qualifiers at Kai Tak Stadium. Following the match, which sealed the country's qualification for the tournament, Neo visited the locker room to praise the national team. Referencing the intense hostility and insults directed at the Singaporean players by the home crowd during the match, Neo stated to the players that "all the [Hong Kong] fans were bloody idiots, end up players also played like idiots... [sic] but you all played like Lions!" Although these private post-match celebrations were unexpectedly captured via a player's Instagram live stream, Neo retracted his statements, saying he should have been more respectful, and subsequently extended a private apology to the Hong Kong government.

=== Response to Dear You debate ===
On 7 July 2026, amid public debates over Singapore's media restrictions on non-Mandarin varieties, Neo, as Acting Minister for Culture, Community and Youth, joked in Parliament that "ministers have no time to watch movies." The remark followed a query from Kenneth Tiong of the Workers' Party (WP) regarding whether ministers had watched Dear You, and whether they viewed it in Mandarin or Teochew.

Dear You, a Chinese film spoken mostly in Teochew, had created debate about the Speak Mandarin Campaign after initial restrictions. Writing for the South China Morning Post, Kolette Lim reported that local arts community members felt the joke understated the value of culture, especially of non-Mandarin Chinese heritage. Critics highlighted the irony of such a dismissive remark from the minister responsible for protecting it. Following the public discourse, Neo watched the Teochew version of the film with seniors at Our Tampines Hub's Festive Arts Theatre on 14 July. In an interview with The Straits Times later that month, Neo stated that he regretted making the joke.

== Personal life ==
Neo is married.

== Awards and decorations ==
- Public Administration Medal, (Gold) (COVID-19)
- Public Administration Medal, (Gold) (Military) - PPA(E)
- Public Administration Medal, (Bronze) (Military) - PPA(G)
- Long Service Medal (Military)
- COVID-19 Resilience Medal
- Singapore Armed Forces Long Service and Good Conduct (20 Years) Medal
- Singapore Armed Forces Long Service and Good Conduct (10 Years) Medal with 15 year clasp
- Singapore Armed Forces Good Service Medal
- Army Meritorious Service Star, 1st Class - Indonesia (2023)
- Gold Cross of Honour of the German Armed Forces
- Knight Grand Cross of the Order of the Crown of Thailand (2024)

== Notes ==
Political offices
Preceded by Edwin Tong	Minister for Culture, Community and Youth (Acting); 2025–present	Incumbent
Vacant Title last held by Chee Hong Tat (2020)	Senior Minister of State for Education; 2025–present Served alongside: Janil Puthucheary	Incumbent
Parliament of Singapore
Preceded by Baey Yam Keng; Cheng Li Hui; Masagos Zulkifli; Koh Poh Koon; Desmond Choo	Member of Parliament for Tampines GRC; 2025–present Served alongside: (2025-present): Baey Yam Keng, Charlene Chen, Masagos Zulkifli, Koh Poh Koon	Incumbent
Military offices
Preceded by Goh Si Hou	Chief of the Singapore Army; 2022–2025	Succeeded by Cai Dexian
