= Aaron Beng =

Singaporean naval officer

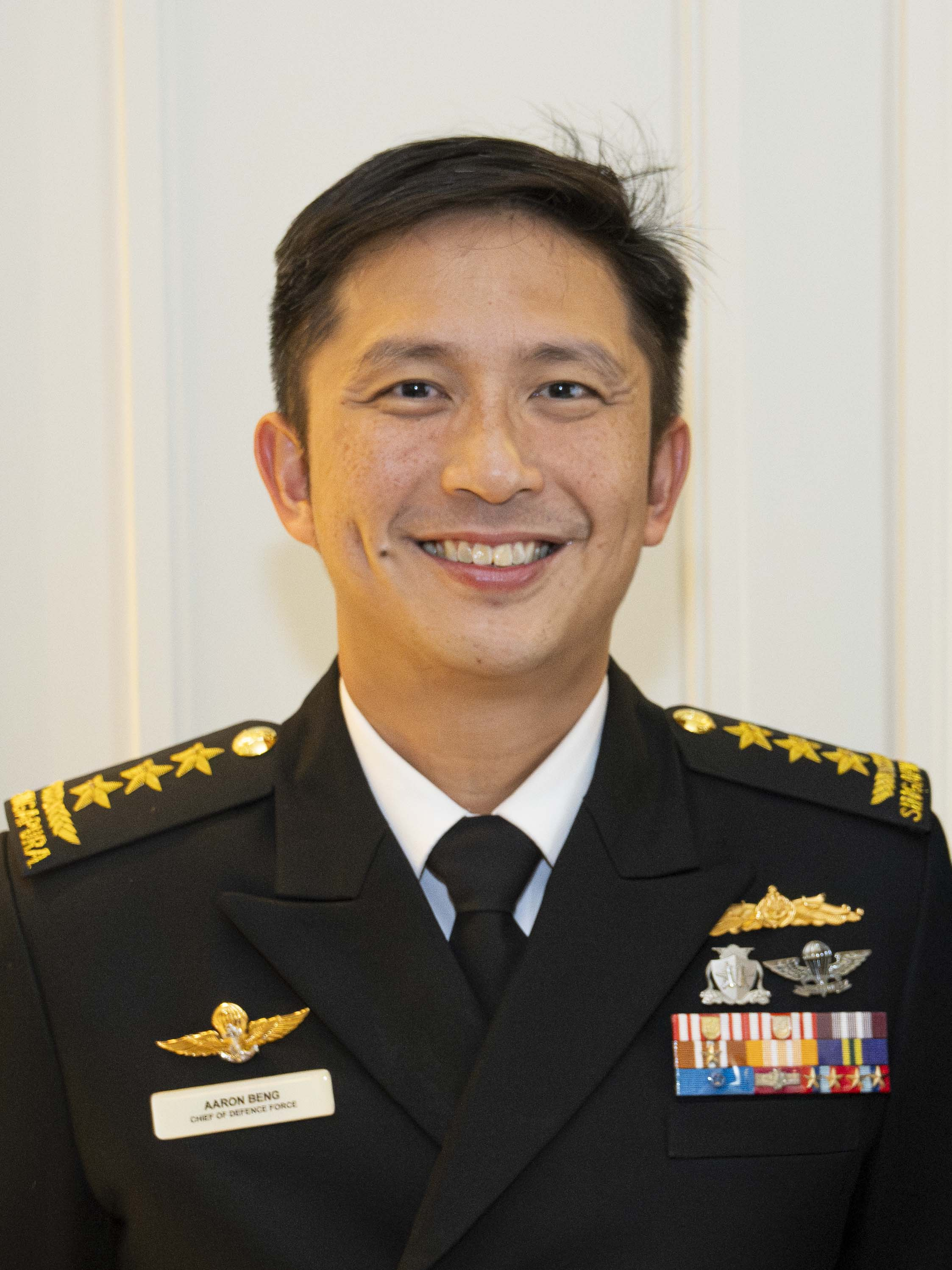
- Vice Admiral Aaron Beng in 2025
- Born: 1981 (age 44–45); Singapore
- Education: Yale University (BS); Naval War College
- Military career
- Allegiance: Singapore
- Branch: Republic of Singapore Navy
- Service years: 2000–present
- Rank: Vice-Admiral
- Commands: Chief of Defence Force; Chief of Navy; Chief of Staff – Naval Staff; Head, RSN Strategy Office; Director of the Defence Policy Office, Ministry of Defence; Fleet Commander; Squadron Commander, Formidable-class frigate Squadron; Commanding Officer, RSS Intrepid

Aaron Beng Yao Cheng PJG PPA(E) PPA(G) (Chinese: 孟耀诚; born 1981) is a Singaporean vice-admiral and Chief of Defence Force. Prior to his appointment as Chief of Defence Force, he served as Chief of Navy between 2020 and 2023. He is the first naval officer to serve as Chief of Defence Force, and the first to hold the rank of Vice-Admiral in the Singapore Armed Forces (SAF).

== Early life and education ==
Beng was born in Singapore in 1981. His father, Arthur Beng Kian Lam, was the Member of Parliament (MP) for Fengshan SMC between 1984 and 1988 for the ruling People's Action Party.

Upon his graduation from Hwa Chong Junior College in 1999, Beng was awarded the President’s Scholarship and the Singapore Armed Forces Overseas Scholarship to study at Yale University, where he majored in economics and electrical engineering sciences, and graduated with a Bachelor of Science degree.

== Military career ==
Beng enlisted into the SAF in 2000. He was Commanding Officer of the frigate RSS Intrepid and subsequently Commanding Officer of the Frigate Squadron. He was also Director of the Defence Policy Office.

Beng was appointed Fleet Commander in March 2019, before his appointment as Chief of Staff – Naval Staff in November 2019. He was appointed Chief of Navy on 23 March 2020, where he served until 10 March 2023.

Beng was appointed Chief of Defence Force on 24 March 2023. He is the first Chief of Navy to serve as Chief of Defence Force. He was promoted as Vice-Admiral, the first person to hold this rank, on 1 July 2023.

== Personal life ==
Beng is married to Sharon Koh.

== Awards and decorations ==
- Meritorious Service Medal (Military) in 2026
- Public Administration Medal (Military) (Bronze) in 2017
- Public Administration Medal (Military) (Gold) in 2023
- Singapore Armed Forces Long Service and Good Conduct (10 Years) Medal with 15 year clasp
- Singapore Armed Forces Long Service and Good Conduct (20 Years) Medal
- Singapore Armed Forces Good Service Medal
- Singapore Armed Forces Overseas Service Medal
- Ordre national du Mérite (Officier) in 2022
- Legion of Merit (Degree of Commander) in 2023
- Bintang Jalasena Utama (Navy Meritorious Service Star, 1st Class) in 2023
- Courageous Commander of The Most Gallant Order of Military Service (P.G.A.T.) in 2023
- The Most Exalted Order of Paduka Keberanian Laila Terbilang, 1st Class (D.P.K.T.)
- Knight Grand Cross of the Most Noble Order of the Crown of Thailand (P.M.) in 2026
- Royal Thai Marine Corps Airborn Wing
- Royal Brunei Navy Command Badge

Military offices
Preceded by Lieutenant-General Melvyn Ong	11th Chief of Defence Force; 24 March 2023 – present	Incumbent
Preceded by Lew Chuen Hong	Chief of Navy; 23 March 2020 – 10 March 2023	Succeeded by Sean Wat
