= Kelvin Fan =

Singaporean air force general

Kelvin Fan Sui Siong PPA(E) PPA(P) PBS
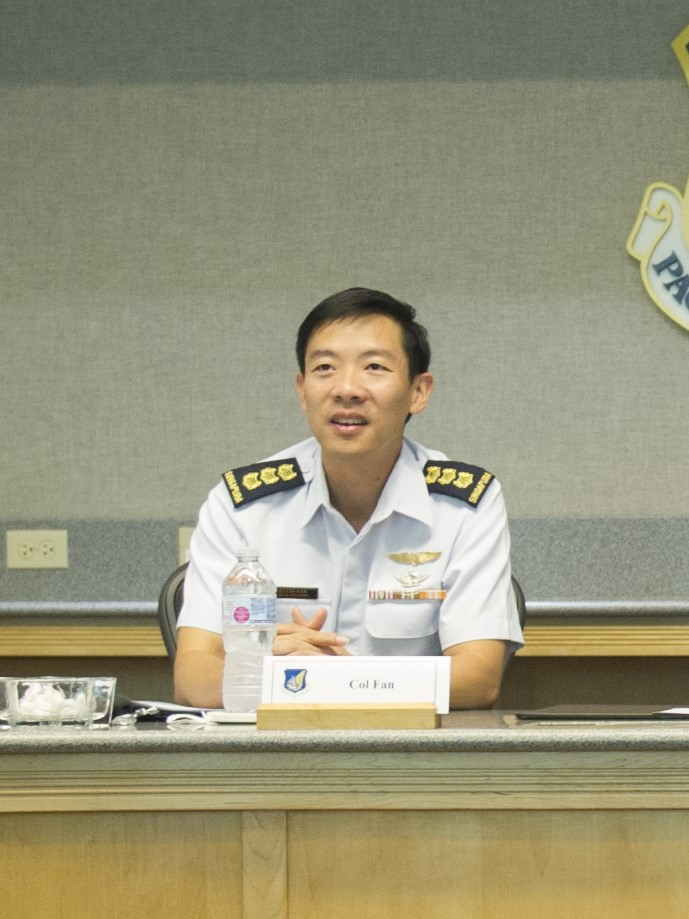
- Fan in 2017
- Born: 11 March 1980 (age 46)
- Allegiance: Singapore
- Branch: Republic of Singapore Air Force
- Service years: 1998–present
- Rank: Major-General
- Commands: Chief of Air Force; Chief Sustainability Officer; Chief of Staff (Air Staff); Chief of Staff (Joint Staff); Director of the Defence Policy Office; Commander, Air Defence and Operations Command; Head, Air Operations; Head, Air Plans; Commanding Officer, 163 Squadron
- Awards: See awards and decorations
- Education: Raffles Junior College; Massachusetts Institute of Technology (MBA); Yale University (MA); Cambridge University (MEc)

Chinese name
- Traditional Chinese: 範瑞祥
- Simplified Chinese: 范瑞祥
- Hanyu Pinyin: Fàn Ruìxiáng
- IPA: [fân.ɻwêɪ.ɕiǎŋ]

Kelvin Fan Sui Siong PPA(E) PPA(P) PBS is a Singaporean major-general who is currently serving as the Chief of Air Force.

== Education ==
In 1998, Fan received the Singapore Armed Forces (SAF) Overseas Scholarship. He went on to obtain a Master of Economics from the University of Cambridge and later earned a Master of Arts in international and developmental economics from Yale University.

In 2010, Fan completed his studies at the Air Command and Staff College. He was awarded the Lee Kuan Yew Post-Graduate Scholarship in 2013 and subsequently earned a Master of Business Administration from the Massachusetts Institute of Technology.

== Military career ==
Fan joined the Singapore Armed Forces in 1998, beginning his service as an air warfare officer in the Republic of Singapore Air Force.

Throughout his military career, Fan has held several key roles, including Commanding Officer of the 163 Squadron; Head of Air Plans; Head of Air Operations; Director of the Defence Policy Office; Commander of the Air Defence and Operations Command; Chief of Staff (Air Staff); Chief of Staff (Joint Staff); and Chief Sustainability Officer.

On 22 March 2024, Fan succeeded Kelvin Khong as the Chief of Air Force. Prior to this appointment, Fan served as Deputy Secretary (Policy) at the Ministry of Defence, where he was responsible for defence policies, international diplomacy, national education, and strategic communications.

Fan was promoted from the rank of brigadier-general to major-general on 1 July 2024.

== Personal life ==
Fan is married to Yvonne Li and has three daughters, Katie, Kayla, and Klara.

== Awards and decorations ==
- Public Administration Medal (Military) (Gold), in 2022.
- Public Administration Medal (Military) (Silver), in 2015.
- Long Service Medal (Military), in 2023.
- Singapore Armed Forces Long Service and Good Conduct (20 Years) Medal
- Singapore Armed Forces Long Service and Good Conduct (10 Years) Medal with 15 year clasp
- Singapore Armed Forces Good Service Medal

Military offices
Preceded by Major-General Kelvin Khong	Chief of the Republic of Singapore Air Force; 22 March 2024 – present	Incumbent
