= Hoo Cher Mou =

Singaporean air force general

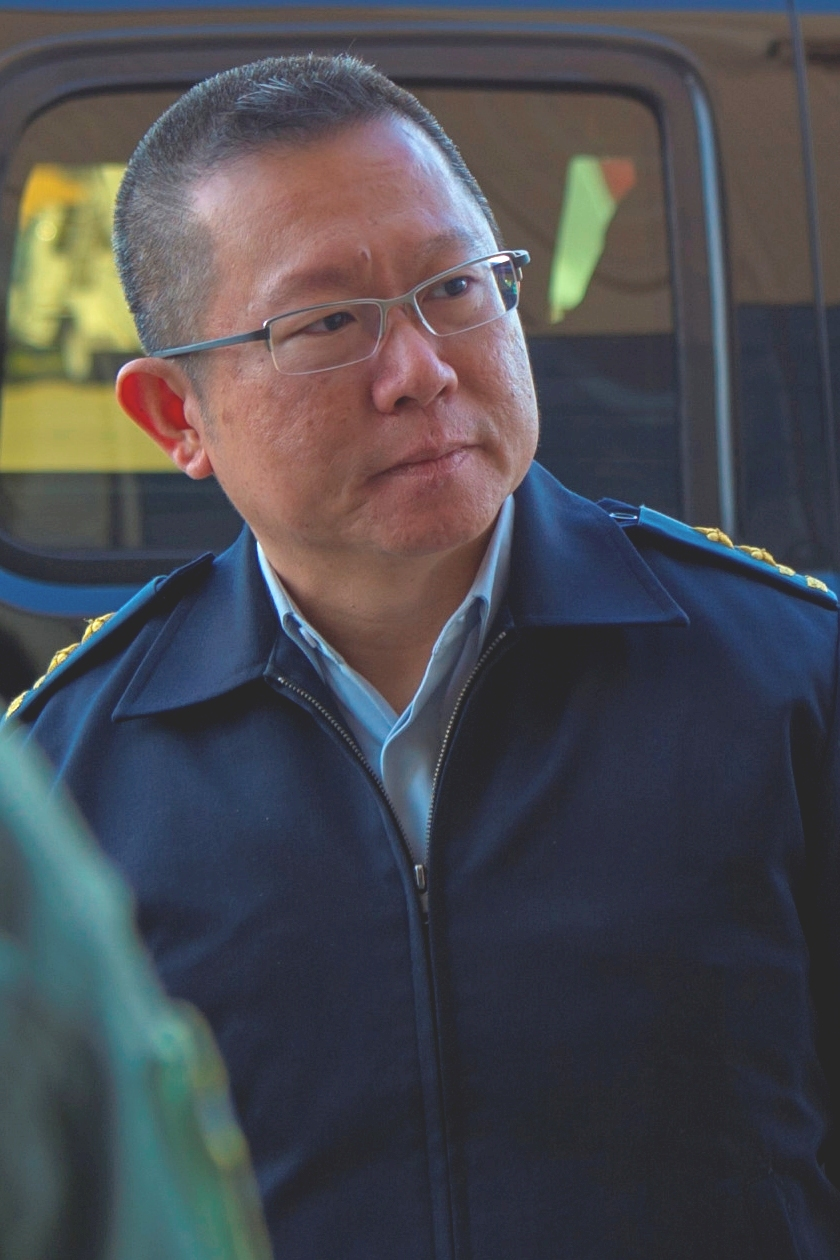
- Hoo in 2014
- Born: 1966 (age 59–60); Singapore
- Allegiance: Singapore
- Branch: Republic of Singapore Air Force
- Service years: 1984–2016
- Rank: Major-General
- Commands: Chief of Air Force; Chief of Staff – Joint Staff; Chief of Staff – Air Staff; Commander, Air Defence and Operations Command; Head, Air Training; Commander, Air Force Systems Brigade; Head, Air Plans; Deputy Head, Joint Operations Department; Commanding Officer, 203 Squadron
- Awards: See awards
- Education: Girton College, Cambridge (BA, MA); Harvard University (MPA)
- Spouse: Julie Hoo

Hoo Cher Mou
- Simplified Chinese: 符策谋
Transcriptions
Standard Mandarin
- Hanyu Pinyin: Fú Cèmóu

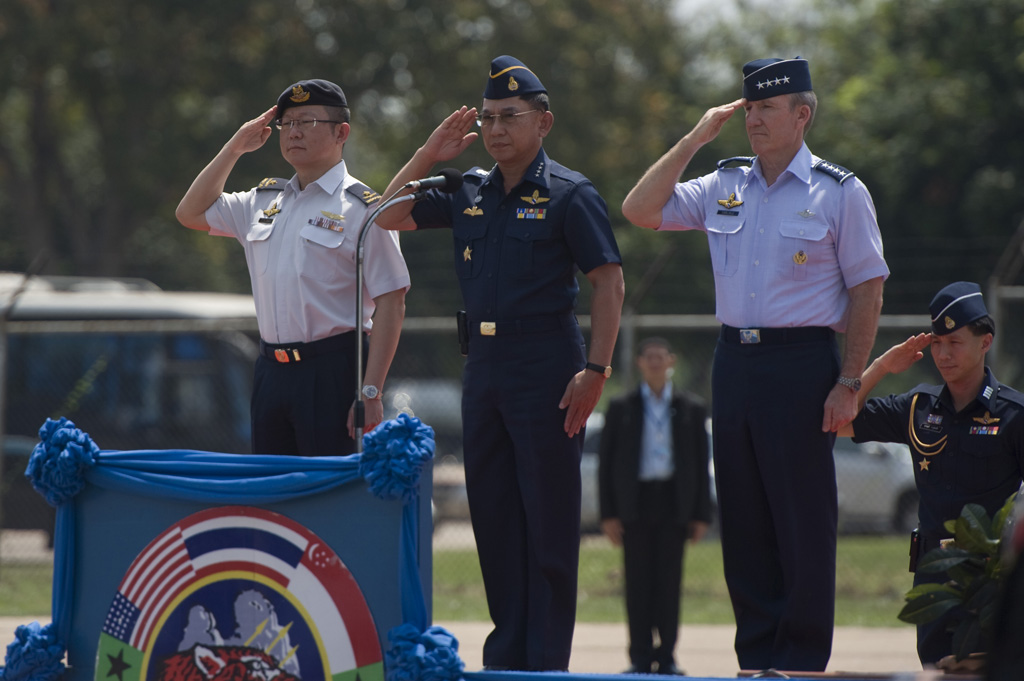
Hoo (left) with Prajin Juntong and Herbert J. Carlisle at Korat Royal Thai Air Force Base in 2013

Hoo Cher Mou PPA(E) PPA(G) PBS is a Singaporean former major-general who served as Chief of Air Force between 2013 and 2016. He was the first non-pilot to serve as Chief of Air Force.

== Education ==
Hoo attended Catholic High School and Hwa Chong Junior College. After receiving the Singapore Armed Forces Overseas Training Award (Academic) in 1985, he studied biochemistry at Girton College, Cambridge and obtained a Bachelor of Arts and Master of Arts. He also attended the RAAF Command and Staff College in 1995 and received the Sir Richard Williams Prize for Oratorical Excellence. In 2000, under the SAF Postgraduate Scholarship, he obtained a Master of Public Administration from Harvard University and graduated as a distinguished Littauer Fellow.

== Military career ==
Hoo enlisted in the Singapore Armed Forces (SAF) in December 1984 and served in the Air Force (RSAF). Throughout his career in the military, he has held various appointments, including: Commanding Officer, 203 Squadron; Deputy Head, Joint Operations Department; Head, Air Plans; Commander, Air Force Systems Brigade; Head, Air Training; Commander, Air Defence and Operations Command; Chief of Staff, Air Staff; Chief of Staff, Joint Staff. Hoo succeeded Ng Chee Meng as the Chief of Air Force on 25 March 2013 and stepped down on 28 March 2016. Hoo, who is trained in air surveillance and air traffic control, is the first non-pilot to serve as the Chief of Air Force.

During Hoo's tenure, the RSAF was involved in humanitarian assistance and disaster relief activities, such as the search for the missing Malaysia Airlines Flight 370 in March 2014, the recovery of Indonesia AirAsia Flight 8501 in December 2014, and aerial firefighting in Sumatra in October 2015. Hoo also oversaw the RSAF's participation in Singapore's Golden Jubilee (SG50) celebrations in 2015, which included performances by the RSAF Black Knights and the "50"-formation flypast by 20 F-16 fighter aircraft at the National Day Parade.

Hoo stepped down from his appointment as the Chief of Air Force on 28 March 2016 and was replaced by Mervyn Tan Wei Ming.

== Awards and decorations ==
- Public Administration Medal (Military) (Gold), in 2014.
- Public Administration Medal (Military) (Bronze), in 2005.
- Long Service Medal (Military), in 2010.
- Singapore Armed Forces Long Service and Good Conduct (20 Years) Medal
- Singapore Armed Forces Long Service and Good Conduct (10 Years) Medal
- Singapore Armed Forces Good Service Medal

== Personal life ==
Hoo is married to Julie Hoo.

Military offices
Preceded by Major-General Ng Chee Meng	Chief of the Republic of Singapore Air Force; 25 March 2013 – 28 March 2016	Succeeded by Brigadier-General Mervyn Tan Wei Ming
