= Cai Dexian =

Singaporean army general

- 蔡德贤
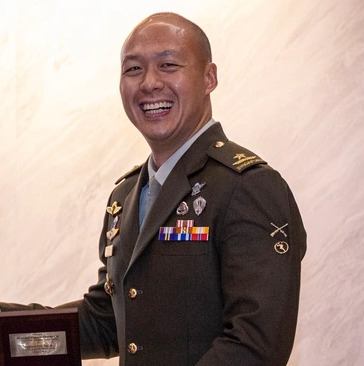
- Cai in 2024

Chief of Army
- Incumbent
- Assumed office 21 March 2025
- Preceded by: David Neo

Personal details
- Born: 1984 (age 41–42) Singapore
- Education: Stanford University (BA); INSEAD (MBA)

Military service
- Allegiance: Singapore
- Branch/service: Singapore Army
- Years of service: 2003–present
- Rank: Major-General
- Commands: Chief of Army (2025–present); Commander, 3rd Division (2022-2025)

Cai Dexian (Note: Chinese: 蔡德贤; pinyin: Cài Déxián) (born 1984) is a Singaporean Major General who has been serving as Chief of Army since 2025.

== Education ==
Cai was awarded the Singapore Armed Forces Overseas Scholarship to study at Stanford University, where he graduated in 2007 with a Bachelor of Arts degree in Economics and International Relations. Cai was also awarded the Lee Kuan Yew scholarship in 2018 to study at INSEAD, where he graduated in 2019 with a Master of Business Administration with distinction.

He also attended the Indonesian Army Command and Staff College (SESKOAD) in 2014 and attained the Top International Student.

== Military career ==
Cai enlisted into the SAF in 2003 and is an armour officer by vocation. He was Commanding Officer of the 48th Battalion Singapore Armoured Regiment and subsequently Commanding Officer of the 8th Singapore Armoured Brigade. He was also a board member of ST Engineering Ltd and D’Crypt Pte Ltd.

Cai was deployed to Afghanistan in 2012 as part of Operation Enduring Freedom. He is the first Singaporean to be awarded with the Bronze Star Medal.

Prior to his appointment as Chief of Army, Cai held the appointment of Commander, 3rd Singapore Division.

Cai was promoted from the rank of Major-General on 1 July 2025.

== Awards and decorations ==
- Pingat Pentadbiran Awam, Gangsa (Tentera) (Public Administration Medal, Bronze (Military)) - PPA(G)
- Singapore Armed Forces Long Service and Good Conduct (20 Years) Medal
- Singapore Armed Forces Long Service and Good Conduct (10 Years) Medal with 15 year clasp
- Singapore Armed Forces Good Service Medal
- Singapore Armed Forces Overseas Service Medal
- NATO Medal for Service with ISAF
- Bronze Star Medal

== Notes ==
Military offices
Preceded by David Neo	Chief of Army; 2025–present	Incumbent
