= Singapore Youth Flying Club =

Singapore flight school

- 新加坡青年飞行俱乐部 (Chinese); Kelab Penerbangan Belia Singapura (Malay)
- Abbreviation: SYFC
- Formation: 1 December 1971; 54 years ago
- Type: Flying club
- Headquarters: 515 West Camp Road 797695
- Location: Singapore
- Coordinates: 1.4143°N 103.8630°E
- Region served: Singapore
- Services: Aeromodelling, flight training
- Chairman: Kelvin Fan
- General Manager: COL (RET) Foo Yang Ge
- Affiliations: Republic of Singapore Air Force
- Website: https://www.syfc.sg/
- Formerly called: Youth Flying Club; Junior Flying Club

The Singapore Youth Flying Club (SYFC) is a flight school based in Seletar Airport, primarily funded by the Republic of Singapore Air Force (RSAF). Established in 1971, the club aims to introduce and promote aviation to students, by providing aeromodelling courses for secondary school students and flight training courses for pre-tertiary students, and encourage trained pilots to serve in the RSAF.

As of 2023, more than 7,500 students have been through the flight training programme, with over 1,200 students graduating with a private pilot licence (PPL), 80% of whom move on to become RSAF pilots.

== History ==
Recognising the need to maintain a steady stream of pilots for the RSAF, the Junior Flying Club was established by Minister for Defence Goh Keng Swee in December 1971 to offer free flight training to youths in Singapore, with the initial fleet consisting of eight Cessna 172s and six AESL Airtourers.

On 5 March 1988, Minister for Education Tony Tan announced the renaming of Junior Flying Club to Youth Flying Club, aligning the club's intent of developing youth pilots in Singapore.

On 12 November 1989, Minister for Communications and Second Minister for Defence (Policy) Yeo Ning Hong announced the acquisition of 12 Piper Warrior IIs to replace the initial fleet, at a cost of S$2 million.

On 27 November 2000, Minister for Education Teo Chee Hean announced a S$16,000,000 modernisation programme funded by the Ministry of Defence. On 23 June 2001, Minister of State for Defence and Information and the Arts David Lim announced the construction of a new clubhouse at its current location, and the Youth Flying Club was renamed to the Singapore Youth Flying Club.

In 2002, two PAC CT/4E Airtrainers were acquired at S$900,000 each, and commissioned by Minister of State for Defence Cedric Foo.

In 2010, to replace the ageing fleet, 13 Diamond DA40s were purchased at a cost of US$3.4 million in total.

== Fleet ==
=== Current fleet ===
Singapore Youth Flying Club fleet
Aircraft	In service	Orders	Passengers	Notes
Diamond DA40	13	—	3	
Total	13	0		

=== Former fleet ===
Singapore Youth Flying Club former fleet
Aircraft	Total	Introduced	Retired	Replacement	Notes
PAC CT/4E Airtrainers	2	2002	2010	Diamond DA40	
Piper PA-28-161 Warrior II	12	1989	2010	Diamond DA40	
AESL AT-6 Airtourers	6	1971	1989	Piper PA-28-161 Warrior II	Transferred from Republic of Singapore Air Force
Cessna 172	8	1971	1989	Piper PA-28-161 Warrior II	Transferred from Republic of Singapore Air Force

== Incidents ==
- 1 September 1995 – The fleet of Piper Warrior IIs were grounded for a month as the Civil Aviation Authority of Singapore withdrew the maintenance approval of the club's appointed maintenance company.
- 14 November 2000 – A Piper PA28, operated by a student pilot, veered off the runway in Seletar Airport and stopped on the grass. The student pilot was treated for shock at the Singapore General Hospital.
- 23 March 2006 – A Piper PA28, registration 9V-BOE, operated by a student pilot on his first solo flight collided with a parked van in Seletar Airport. The pilot made a premature turn into a wrong parking bay, where there was a parked aircraft and van, and attempted to correct the situation by taxiing between the parked aircraft and van. While successfully avoiding collision with the parked aircraft, the pilot did not look on his left, leading to an impact with the parked van and the left wing of his aircraft. No injuries were reported. The occurrence was classified as an incident.
- 30 October 2007 – A Piper PA28, registration 9V-BOH, operated by a student pilot on a solo flight veered off the runway in Seletar Airport, causing the sole runway at the airport to be closed for about two hours. No injuries were reported.
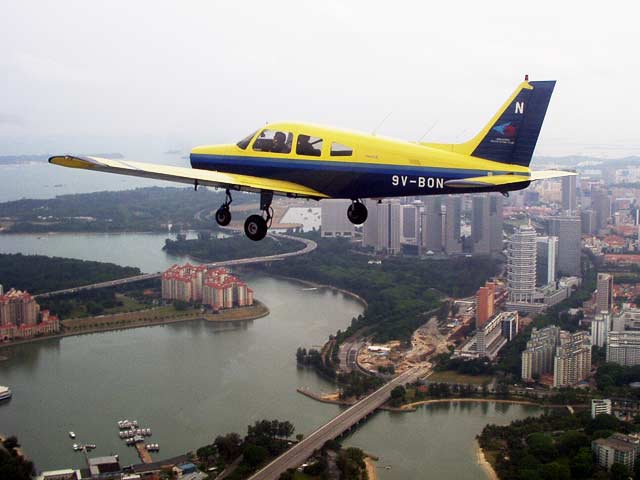
  Piper PA-28-161 Warrior II, 9V-BON
- 15 July 2010 – A Piper PA28, registration 9V-BON, operated by a student pilot on a solo flight mistook a take-off clearance and performed a runway incursion in Seletar Airport. A Cessna 172, registration 9V-FCI, was taking off from the runway at the same time, and stopped about 100 metres (330 ft) from the PA28 after having its takeoff clearance cancelled. This occurrence was classified as an incident.
- 11 August 2013 – A Diamond DA40, registration 9V-YFM, operated by a student pilot on a solo flight veered off the runway in Seletar Airport upon landing, leading to an impact between a taxiway signboard and the aircraft. No injuries were reported. The occurrence was classified as a serious incident.

== Notable alumni ==
- Kelvin Khong – former Chief of Air Force
- Khoo Teh Lynn – Singapore's first female fighter pilot
- Koh Chai Hong – Singapore's first female pilot
- Ng Chee Meng – former Chief of Air Force and Chief of Defence Force
- Raymund Ng – former Chief of Air Force
- Christine Sim – Singapore's first female helicopter pilot

== Membership ==
=== Chairmen ===
Name	Years served	Notes
Captain Pow Tuk Kwan	1985–1997	

=== Presidents ===
Name	Years served	Notes
Brigadier General Yam Ah Mee	1998–2006	
Brigadier General Charles Sih	2006–2009	
Brigadier General Hoo Cher Mou	2009–?	

=== General managers ===
Name	Years served	Notes
Lieutenant Colonel (Retired) Timothy James de Souza	2000–2006	
Colonel (Retired) Andy Tan	2006–2015	

== Bibliography ==
- Cheong, Colin (2006). Flying Colours: Singapore Youth Flying Club. Singapore: SNP Editions. ISBN 978-9-8124-8111-5.
