= Long Service Medal (Military) =

Singapore Armed Forces award

- Medal
- Type: Medal
- Awarded for: 25 years service
- Presented by: Singapore
- Eligibility: Members of the Singapore Armed Forces
- Status: Active
- Established: 9 August 2006
- Ribbon

Precedence
- Next (higher): Singapore Armed Forces Overseas Service Medal
- Next (lower): Singapore Armed Forces Long Service and Good Conduct (20 Years) Medal
- Related: Pingat Bakti Setia

The Long Service Medal (Military) is a decoration awarded to a member of the Singapore Armed Forces (SAF) (regardless of regular or NSmen status) who has completed 25 years of continuous service.

Previously, regular servicemen were eligible for the Pingat Bakti Setia (Long Service Award) in line with other government employees, however NSmen were not eligible.

== Description ==
- The ribbon is white, with a central red stripe and two flanking thin red stripes on either side.

== Service medals ==
In the SAF, the medals for service are:

- 5 years - Singapore Armed Forces Good Service Medal
- 10 years - Singapore Armed Forces Long Service and Good Conduct (10 Years) Medal
- 15 years - Singapore Armed Forces Long Service and Good Conduct (10 Years) Medal with 15 year clasp
- 20 years - Singapore Armed Forces Long Service and Good Conduct (20 Years) Medal
- 25 years - Long Service Medal (Military)
- 30 years - Singapore Armed Forces Long Service and Good Conduct (20 Years) Medal with 30 year clasp

== Notable recipients ==
- Aaron Beng
- Halford Boudewyn
- Cai Dexian
- Winston Choo
- Kelvin Fan
- Goh Pei Ming
- Hoo Cher Mou
- Kelvin Khong
- Khoo Boon Hui
- Perry Lim
- David Neo
- Neo Kian Hong
- Ng Chee Meng
- Ng Yat Chung
- Evelyn Norris
- Melvyn Ong
- Ravinder Singh
- Su Guaning
- Mervyn Tan
- Ronnie Tay
- Sean Wat
- Lee Yi-Jin
