= Singapore Armed Forces Long Service and Good Conduct Medal =

Singapore Armed Forces Long Service and Good Conduct Medal may refer to:

- Singapore Armed Forces Long Service and Good Conduct (20 Years) Medal
- Singapore Armed Forces Long Service and Good Conduct (10 Years) Medal
