= Nugroho Septijantono =

Indonesian army general

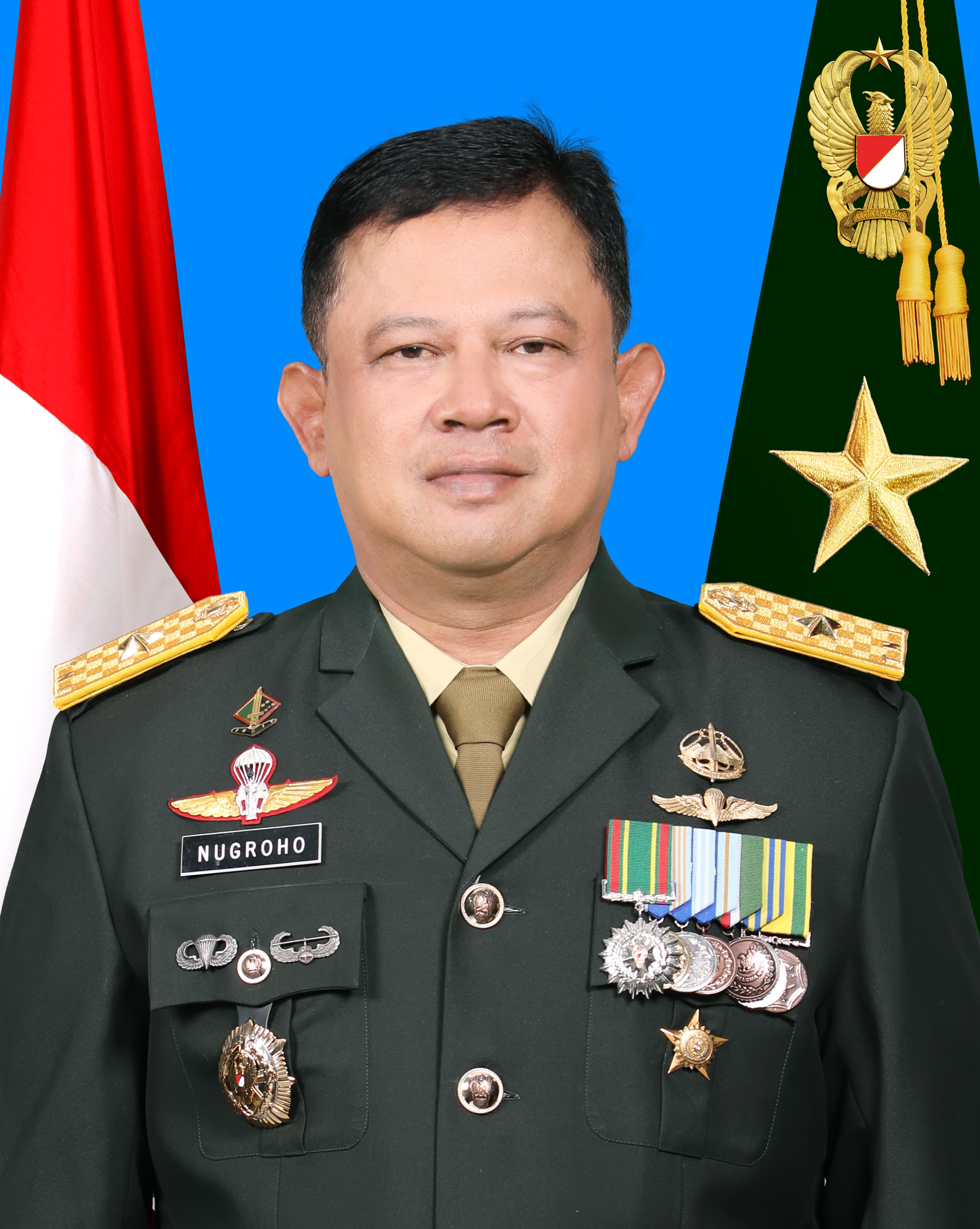
- Born: September 25, 1967 (age 59); Bandung, West Java, Indonesia
- Military career
- Allegiance: Indonesia
- Branch: Indonesian Army
- Service years: 1992–present
- Rank: Brigadier general
- Unit: Infantry
- Commands: Kuta Military Sub-District Command; Pattimura Regional Military Command Headquarters Detachment

Nugroho Septijantono (born 25 September 1967) is an Indonesian army general who is currently serving as the Chief of the Army Information and Data Processing Service. He served in the position since 23 May 2023. He began his assignment at the 741th Infantry Battalion and was rotated to various military units, including the Indonesian Army Command and General Staff College and the Army History Service.

== Career ==
Nugroho Septijantono was born on 25 September 1967 in Bandung. He graduated from the Indonesian Military Academy in 1992. He began his career at the 741th Infantry Battalion as a platoon commander, during which he met with future army chief of staff, Dudung Abdurachman. He was then transferred to the Kuta Military Sub-District Command and the Indonesian Army Command and General Staff College.

Upon completing advanced military education at the Indonesian Army Command and General Staff College in 2012, Nugroho was appointed as senior assistant officer for social communication in the army headquarters. After a year, Nugroho was appointed as the commander of the headquarters detachment in the Pattimura Regional Military Command. He was relieved from the position on 21 November 2016 and was transferred to the Merdeka Regional Military Command in North Sulawesi as its chief of information and data processing department. He received a promotion to the rank of colonel on 1 April 2017.

Nugroho ended his stint in the regional military command on 1 November 2018. He was stationed at the Army Information and Data Processing Service as the chief of the operations information management sub-service. He was briefly stationed at the Army History Service as the chief of the functions management sub-service before returning to the Army Information and Data Processing Service as secretary.

On 23 May 2023, Nugroho was installed as the Chief of the Army Information and Data Processing Service. He was promoted to the rank of brigadier general on 5 June. After serving for two years, on 30 September 2025 a decree by the armed forces commander assigned Nugroho to the army headquarters as a flag officer preparing for retirement.
