= Indonesian Army Command and General Staff College =

Army Command and General Staff College
- Sekolah Staf dan Komando Angkatan Darat
- Active: 5 October 1951–present
- Country: Indonesia
- Branch: Indonesian Army
- Garrison/HQ: Bandung, West Java
- Mottos: Viyata Vira Jati ("Educating true warrior")
- Website: seskoad.mil.id

Commanders
- Commander: Maj.Gen. I Ketut Duara
- Deputy Commander: Brig.Gen. Fritz Gerald Manusun Tua Pasaribu
- Inspector: Brig.Gen. Muhammad Ali

The Indonesian Army Command and General Staff College (Indonesian: Sekolah Staf dan Komando Angkatan Darat, SESKOAD) in Bandung, West Java, is a prominent graduate school for Indonesian Army and sister-service officers, inter-agency representatives, and international military officers. The college was established in 1951 in order to fulfill the demands for army officers that will pursue their armed forces career in commands and leadership. It has been commanded by Major General Anton Nugroho since 18 June 2020.

== History ==
=== Establishment ===
The establishment of Seskoad was driven by the need of the government for a standard of quality among Indonesian army officer. At that time, army officers originated from different military units. The college was officially established in Jakarta by the Chief of Staff of the Army on 5 October 1951. The first commander was Lieutenant Colonel A.Y. Mokoginta. The college was established because there was a shortage of well-trained army officers who were capable of advanced command and staff responsibilities or leadership such as unit commanders and executive officers. The first course, attended by 26 officers with the rank of captain or major, began in Cililitan, Jakarta on 17 November. On 17 February 1953, the first campus of the college was inaugurated by President Sukarno in Bandung. In 1961, the official abbreviation changed from SSKAD to SESKOAD, although the name of the institution remained the same.

== Notable People & Alumni ==
=== Indonesian ===
- Abdul Haris Nasution
- Andika Perkasa
- Feisal Tanjung
- Gatot Subroto
- Hendropriyono
- Luhut Binsar Pandjaitan
- Moeldoko
- Prabowo Subianto
- Ryamizard Ryacudu
- Suharto
- Susilo Bambang Yudhoyono
- Syarifudin Tippe
- T. B. Simatupang
- Try Sutrisno
- Umar Wirahadikusumah
- Wiranto

=== International ===
- Brig Gen James McDevitt, United States Armed Forces
- G. J. Leroy, United States Armed Forces
- Maj Gen Kenneth Osuji
- Brig Gen John Rowland, Australian Defense Forces
- Colin East, Australian Defense Forces
- J. W. Burns, Australian Defense Forces
- Brig Gen Lim Hock Yu, Singapore Armed Forces
- Lt Gen Melvyn Ong, Singapore Armed Forces
- Maj Gen David Neo Chin Wee, Singapore Armed Forces
- B. J. Marshall, New Zealand Armed Forces
- Lt. General Asif Ghafoor, Pakistan Army
- Maj Gen Cai Dexian, Singapore Armed Forces

== See also ==
- United States Army Command and General Staff College

== Bibliography ==
- Seskoad (1989), Karya Juang Seskoad [Seskoad's Feats of Struggle] (in Indonesian), Jakarta
