= SYFC =

SYFC may refer to:

- Simla Youngs FC, an Indian football club from New Delhi
- Singapore Youth Flying Club, a Singaporean flight school primarily funded by the Republic of Singapore Air Force
