= Koh Chai Hong =

Singaporean pilot (born 1959)

Personal details
- Born: 1959 (age 66–67)
- Known for: First female pilot in the Republic of Singapore Air Force and one of first two women to be promoted to the rank of Lieutenant-Colonel in the Singaporean military

Military service
- Allegiance: Singapore
- Rank: Lieutenant colonel

Koh Chai Hong (born 1959) is a Singaporean pilot who is known for being the first woman to qualify as a pilot in the Republic of Singapore Air Force (RSAF) and one of the first two women to be promoted to the rank of Lieutenant-Colonel in the Singaporean Army. She is also a former national champion in water-skiing.

== Early life ==
In 1959, Koh was born. Koh studied at Opera Estate Girls' School and Tanjong Katong Girls School as a child. She attended high school and completed her A levels at Raffles Institution. Koh was a talented athlete and played on the school's women's hockey team. Koh's interest in aviation was sparked by a career talk she attended while at the school.

== Education ==
In college, Koh joined the Junior Flying Club, despite parental objections. Koh received her private pilot license within seven months.

== Career ==
In 1978, when the RSAF first allowed women to join, Koh began training and obtained her pilot wings in 1979 after a year and a half, becoming the first woman to qualify. During Koh's training, she was the only student to win all three flying trophies: best in basic phase, best in advanced phase, and best in aerobatics.

In 1981, Koh became a flying instructor.

In 1987, Koh won a medal as a national water skier at the Southeast Asia Games.

In 1997, Koh was the first woman to be admitted to the highest level of formal military training in Singapore, the Singapore Armed Forces' Command and Staff Course. In 1998, Koh became the first woman to be promoted to the rank of Commanding Officer of Standards Squadron in Flying Training School. In 1999, Koh was promoted to the rank of Lieutenant-Colonel.

In 2005, Chai Hong retired as a Lieutenant-Colonel. Koh became a simulator instructor for Lockheed Martin training RSAF Basic Wings Phase pilot trainees in Perth, Australia.

== Awards ==
In 2015, Koh was inducted into the Singapore Women's Hall of Fame.
