= Pingat Penghargaan (Tentera) =

Singapore Armed Forces award

Pingat Penghargaan (Tentera) (Commendation Medal (Military))
- Ribbon
- Type: Medal
- Awarded for: Commendable achievements in military command or staff work, or service over and above the call of duty
- Presented by: Singapore
- Eligibility: Members of the Singapore Armed Forces
- Status: Active
- Established: 2 August 1996
- Navy; Army; Air Force; Ribbon prior to 1996

Precedence
- Next (higher): Pingat Pentadbiran Awam, Gangsa (Tentera)
- Next (lower): Pingat Berkebolehan (Tentera)
- Related: Pingat Kepujian

The Pingat Penghargaan (Tentera) (English: Commendation Medal (Military)) is a decoration awarded to any member of the Singapore Armed Forces who has placed himself above his peers through commendable achievements in military command or staff work, or who has performed service over and above the call of duty. The Pingat Kepujian is the civil equivalent award.

Prior to 1996, the three services issued their own version of the Pingat Penghargaan (Tentera). Whilst retaining the same name, the ribbons and medals differed. The individual service medals where issued in three grades: Gold, Silver and Bronze.

== Description ==
- The ribbon is red with a double white central stripe.
