= Awards and decorations of the Singapore Armed Forces =

Orders and decorations conferred to military personnel of the Singapore Armed Forces in Singapore, listed by order of precedence:

== Medals and Orders currently issued to service members ==
- Darjah Utama Bakti Cemerlang (Tentera) (Distinguished Service Order (Military)) - DUBC
- Pingat Gagah Perkasa (Tentera) (Conspicuous Gallantry Medal (Military)) - PGP
- Pingat Jasa Gemilang (Tentera) (Meritorious Service Medal (Military) - PJG
- Pingat Pentadbiran Awam, Emas (Tentera) (Public Administration Medal, Gold (Military)) - PPA(E)
- Pingat Pentadbiran Awam, Perak (Tentera) (Public Administration Medal, Silver (Bar) (Military)) - PPA(P)(L)
- Pingat Pentadbiran Awam, Perak (Tentera) (Public Administration Medal, Silver (Military)) - PPA(P)
- Pingat Pentadbiran Awam, Gangsa (Tentera) (Public Administration Medal, Bronze (Military)) - PPA(G)
- Pingat Penghargaan (Tentera) (Commendation Medal (Military))
- Pingat Berkebolehan (Tentera) (Efficiency Medal (Military)) - PB
- Pingat Bakti Setia (Long Service Medal (Military)) - PBS
- Singapore Armed Forces Long Service and Good Conduct (35 Years) Medal with 40 year clasp
- Singapore Armed Forces Long Service and Good Conduct (35 Years) Medal
- Singapore Armed Forces Long Service and Good Conduct (20 Years) Medal with 30 year clasp
- Singapore Armed Forces Long Service and Good Conduct (20 Years) Medal
- Singapore Armed Forces Long Service and Good Conduct (10 Years) Medal with 15 year clasp
- Singapore Armed Forces Long Service and Good Conduct (10 Years) Medal
- Singapore Armed Forces National Service Medal with 15 year clasp
- Singapore Armed Forces National Service Medal
- Singapore Armed Forces Good Service Medal
- Singapore Armed Forces Overseas Service Medal with bronze star
- Singapore Armed Forces Overseas Service Medal
- Tsunami Relief Operation Medal
- Pingat Jasa Perwira (Tentera) Singapore Armed Forces Medal for Distinguished Act

== Foreign and International Awards ==
Below are some of the awards, medals and orders that various military personnel have earned or been accorded to

- Legion D'Honneur (Commandeur)
- The Most Exalted Order of Paduka Keberanian Laila Terbilang (1st Class), Brunei
- Bintang Yudha Dharma Utama (1st Class), Indonesia
- Bintang Kartika Eka Pakçi Utama (1st Class) (Army Meritorious Service Star), Indonesia
- Bintang Jalasena Utama (1st Class) (Navy Meritorious Service Star), Indonesia
- Bintang Swa Bhuwana Paksa Utama (1st Class) (Air Force Meritorious Service Star), Indonesia
- Knight Grand Cross of The Most Exalted Order of the White Elephant, Thailand
- Knight Grand Cross of the Most Noble Order of the Crown, Thailand
- Darjah Panglima Gagah Angkatan Tentera (Honorary Malaysian Armed Forces Order for Valour) (First Degree), Malaysia
- Order of the Sacred Tripod (寶鼎勳章) with Grand Cordon (大綬) (2nd Class)
- Order of the Cloud and Banner (雲麾勳章) with Yellow Grand Cordon (黃色大綬) (3rd Class)
- Order of National Security Merit Tong-il Medal (통일장) (1st Grade)
- Order of National Security Merit Cheonsu Medal (천수장) (3rd Grade)
- Legion Of Merit (Commander)
- Bronze Star Medal
- Meritorious Service Medal
- Joint Service Commendation Medal
- Army Commendation Medal
- Army Achievement Medal
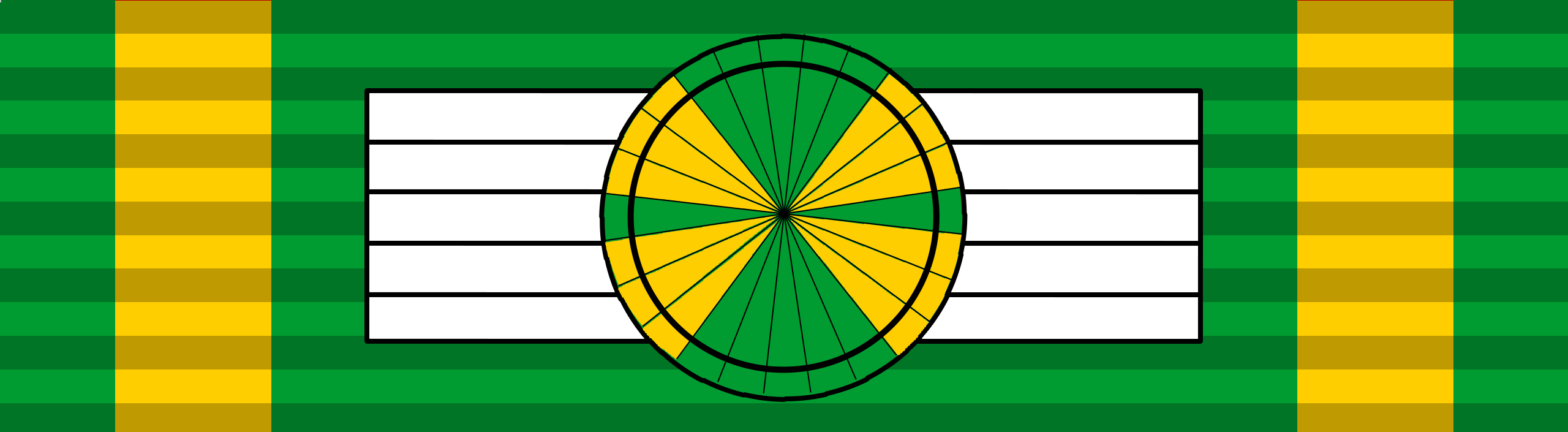
- Order of King Abdulaziz (3rd Class)
- UK Gulf Medal
- Commemorative Medal for Peace Keeping Operations (Herinneringsmedaille Vredesoperaties), Netherlands
- United Nations Iraq / Kuwait Observers Mission (UNIKOM) Medal
- International Force East Timor Medal
- MINUGUA - United Nations Verification Mission in Guatemala
- UNMISET - United Nations Mission of Support in East Timor
- United Nations Headquarters New York (UNHQ) Medal
- NATO Medal (Non-Article 5)
- UK Royal Military Academy Sandhurst Medal
- Ordre national du Mérite
- UNMIT - United Nations Integrated Mission in East Timor
- Timor-Leste Solidarity Medal

== Badges ==
=== Exceptional Skills Badges ===
==== Military Free Fall Parachutist ====
- Basic Military Free Fall Parachutist Badge
- Advanced Military Free Fall Parachutist Badge
- Gold Military Free Fall Parachutist Badge

==== Parachutist ====
- Senior Parachutist Badge
- Master Parachutist Badge

=== Skills Badges ===
==== Basic Airborne Course (BAC) ====
- Basic Parachutist Badge

==== Jungle Confidence Course (JCC) ====
- Jungle Confidence Course Badge
- Advanced Jungle Confidence Course Badge
- Master Jungle Confidence Course Badge

==== Combat Skills ====
- Combat Skills Badge
- Advanced Combat Skills Badge
- Master Combat Skills Badge

==== Explosive Ordnance Disposal (EOD) ====
- Basic Explosive Ordnance Disposal Badge
- Advanced Explosive Ordnance Disposal Badge
- Senior Explosive Ordnance Disposal Badge

==== CBRD (Chemical, Biological & Radiological Defence) ====
- Basic Chemical Biological Radiological Defence Badge
- Advanced Chemical Biological Radiological Defence Badge

==== Basic Aerial Cargo Rigger Course (BACRC) ====
- Rigger Badge

==== Sniper ====
- Sniper Basic Badge
- Sniper Advanced Badge
- Sniper Master Badge

==== Combat Fitness Trainer ====
- Combat Fitness Trainer Basic Badge
- Combat Fitness Trainer Advanced Badge
- Combat Fitness Trainer Master Badge

==== Ammunition (Ammo) ====
- Ammo Basic Badge
- Ammo Advanced Badge

==== Others ====
- Silent Precision Drill Badge
- Paramedic Badge
- Taekwondo Black Belt Badge
- Musician
  - Musician Badge
  - Director of Music Badge

=== Skills Tabs ===
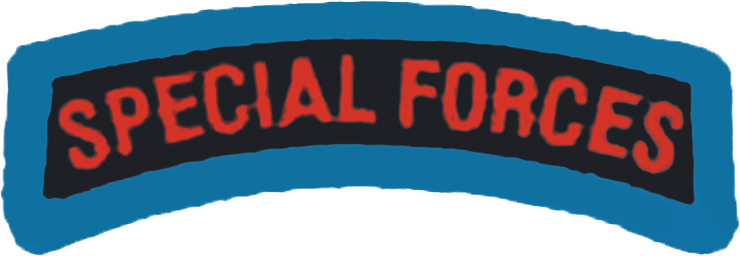
Special Forces Tab

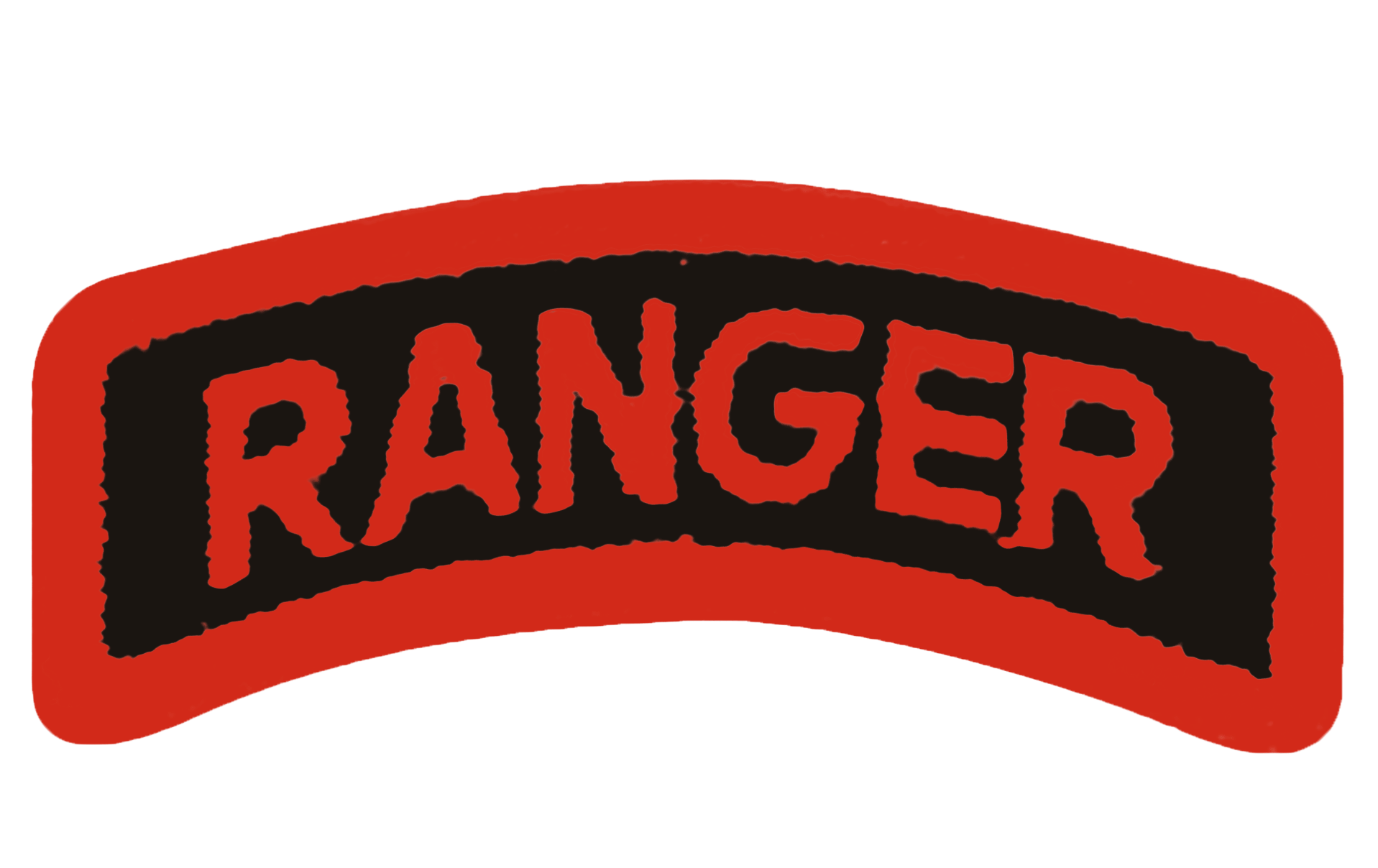
Ranger Tab

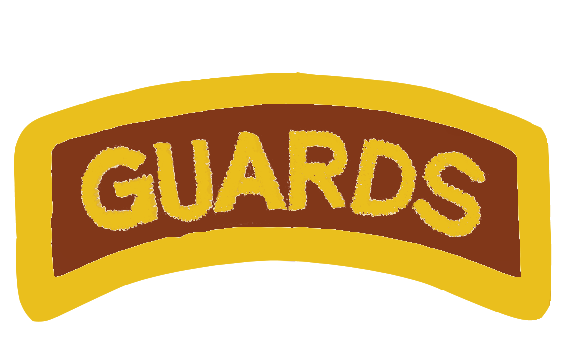
Guards Tab

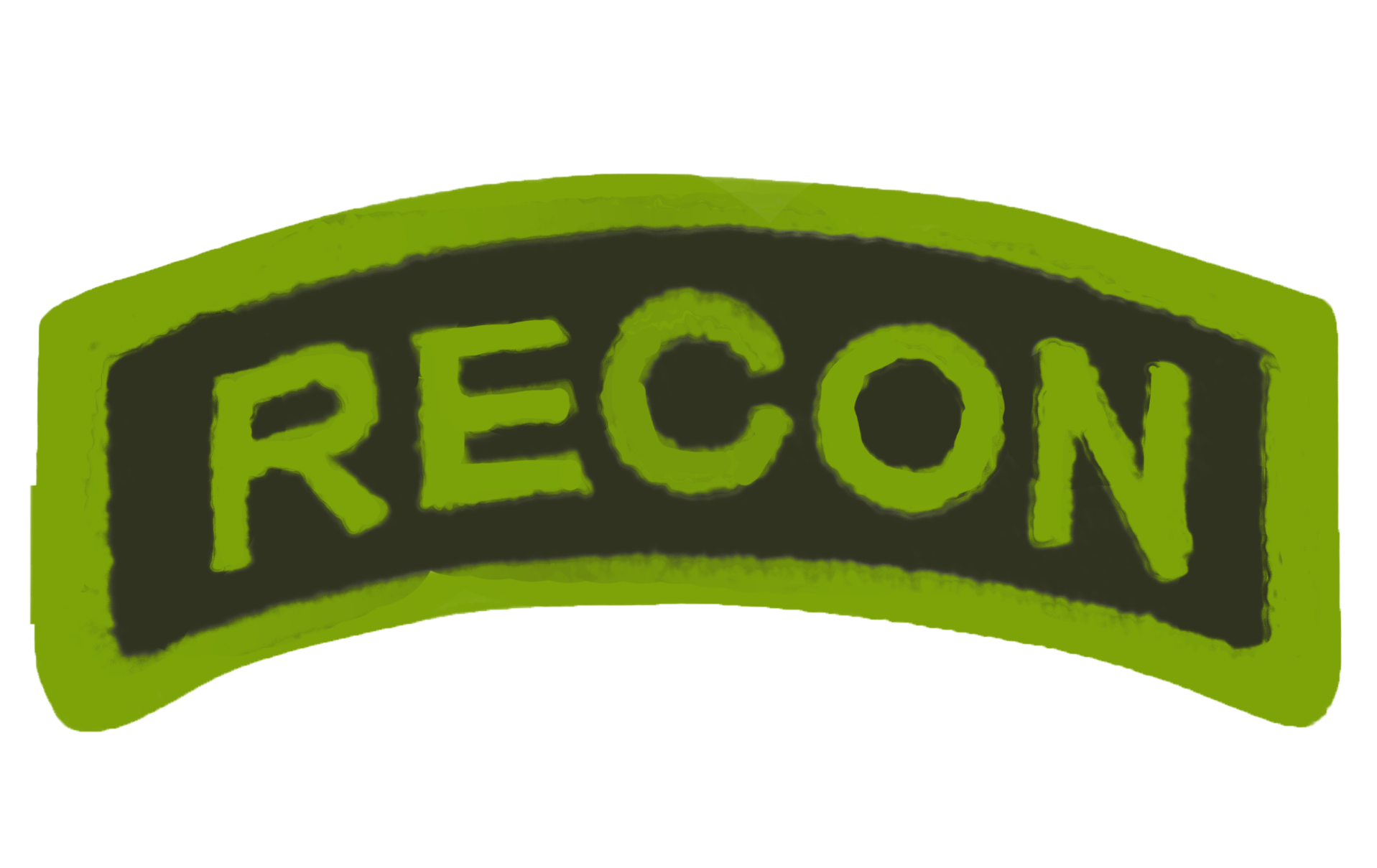
Reconnaissance (RECON) Tab

=== Proficiency Badges ===
- IPPT Gold Award Badge
- IPPT Silver Award Badge
- Marksmanship Badge

=== Incentive Badges ===
- Safe and Courteous Driver Badge

=== Identification Badge ===
- Para Counsellor Badge
- Aide-de-Camp Badge
- Distinguished Shooting Badges

=== Navy-related badges ===
- Naval Warfare Badge
- Naval Divers
  - Basic Diving Badge
  - Professional Diving Badge
  - Senior Professional Diver Badge
  - Senior Diving Supervisor Badge
- Submariner's Badge
- Mission Crew Wing
- Naval Warfare System Engineers
  - Engineers Badge
- Naval Warfare System Experts
  - Command and Control (C2) Badge
  - Communication Systems (CS) Badge
  - Electronic Warfare Systems (EWS) Badge
  - Mechanical Systems (MS)/Electrical Control Systems (ECS)/Naval Architects (NARC) Badge
  - Naval Supply Experts/Naval Chefs Badge
  - Navigation Systems (NVS) Badge
  - Weapon Systems (WS)/Weapon Control Systems Operator (WS-C) Badge
  - Underwater Warfare Badge
- CIC Supervisor's Badge
- Craft Coxswain Skill Badge
- MARSEC Boarding Skills Badge
- Naval Medical Skills Badge

=== Air Force badges ===
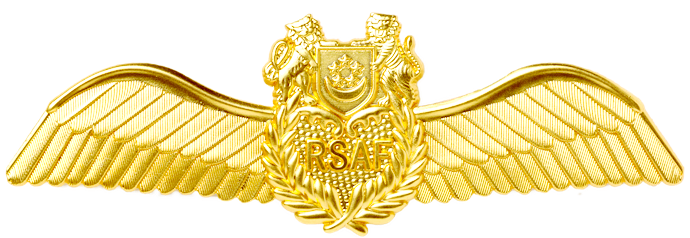
Pilot Badge
- Aviation Medical Officer Badge
- Air Crew Specialist Badge
- Air Defence Systems Specialist Badge
- Air Force Engineer Badge
- Air Imagery Intelligence Expert Badge
- Air Operations & System Expert Badge
- Air Warfare Officer Badge
- Air Force Engineer (Flight Engineer) Badge
- Unmanned Aerial Vehicle Pilot Badge
- Weapon Systems Officer (Fighter) Badge
- Air Electronic Warfare Badge

=== Digital and Intelligence Service badges ===
- Military Intelligence Expert Badge
- Digital and Intelligence Systems Engineer Badge
- C4 Expert (C4X) Badge
- Production Media Technician Badge
