= Evelyn Norris =

Singaporean educator (1918–2014)

Noel Evelyn Norris (25 December 1918 – 15 February 2014) was a Singaporean educator best known for her association with Raffles Girls' School. She was also the first principal of Crescent Girls' School. Norris was a volunteer in the Royal Air Force during World War II and later became a Major in the People's Defence Force in charge of the Singapore Women Auxiliary Corps.

== Biography ==
Norris was born Noel Evelyn Norris on 25 December 1918. She started primary school at Raffles Girls' Primary School in 1925. She attended Raffles Girls' Schools until 1933, when she studied for a year at St. George's Girls School. She studied history at Raffles College and earned a degree in Education.

Norris started teaching at Bukit Panjang Primary School in 1939, but when World War II broke out, she went to India and Ceylon as a volunteer in the Royal Air Force (RAF). In the RAF, she worked as a librarian in the Royal Air Force Library. When the war ended, she came back to Singapore and taught history at the Raffles Girls' School (RGS) from 1946 to 1955. In 1956 she became the principal of the new Crescent Girls' School. Norris came back to RGS to work as principal there until she retired in 1976.

During her leadership at RGS, Norris developed extracurricular activities, including various sports and music programs. She also encouraged students to learn and understand various "mother tongue" languages in Singapore by conducting weekly assemblies in different languages each week. These assemblies rotated through English, Malay and Tamil and other classes included Mandarin. Norris also worked on Ministry of Education committees and helped revise the history syllabus. Norris also stayed active in the People's Defence Force, eventually becoming a Major of the Singapore Women Auxiliary Corps, and later took over the National Cadet Corps girls' section.

After retiring, Norris dedicated her life to community service and worked as a volunteer at the Society for the Prevention of Cruelty to Animals (SPCA). She also taught at the School for Retarded Children.

In November 2011, Norris had a stroke and spent around six months in Tan Tock Seng Hospital. After her discharge, a group made up of former students and faculty of Raffles Girls' School took care of her at her home in Brighton Crescent. Norris died on 15 February 2014.

Norris was awarded the Public Service Administration Medal (Silver) in 1964. In 1977, she was awarded the Long Service Medal. Norris was inducted into the Singapore Women's Hall of Fame in 2019.
