= Pingat Kepujian =

Pingat Kepujian (Commendation Medal)
- Ribbon
- Type: Medal
- Awarded for: Commendable performance and conduct, or significant efficiency, competence and devotion to duty
- Presented by: Singapore
- Eligibility: Any person employed by, or associated with, government service
- Status: Active
- Established: 1996

Precedence
- Next (higher): Pingat Pentadbiran Awam (Gangsa)
- Next (lower): Pingat Bakti Masyarakat
- Related: Pingat Penghargaan (Tentera)

The Pingat Kepujian (English: Commendation Medal) is a Singaporean decoration instituted in 1996. The medal may be awarded to any of the following persons who has distinguished himself through commendable performance and conduct, or significant efficiency, competence and devotion to duty:

- any person who is or has been a public officer.
- any person who is or has been an officer employed by any statutory authority (other than a Town Council).
- any person who is or has been in the service of any organisation, association or body rendering services in the field of education.
- any person who is or has been employed in any company which is wholly owned by the Government and which is carrying on business mainly as an agent or instrumentality of the Government.

Recipients are entitled to use the post-nominal letters PK or P.Kepujian.

The Pingat Penghargaan (Tentera) is the military equivalent award.

== Description ==
- The medal consists of a silver disc embellished with a laurel wreath along its rim. On the obverse side is a shield bearing a crescent and 5 stars encircled by a laurel wreath.
- The reverse bears the State Arms.
- The ribbon is red with a grey centre band flanked on each side by a grey stripe.
