= Syarifudin Tippe =

Indonesian military general (1953–2021)

Lieutenant General (Ret.) Syarifuddin Tippe
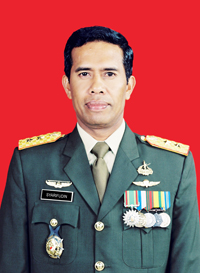
- Born: 10 July 1953; Sinjai, South Sulawesi, Indonesia
- Died: 14 February 2021 (aged 67); Jakarta, Indonesia
- Spouse: Hidayati
- Children: 2
- Military career
- Service years: 1975–2012
- Rank: Lieutenant general
- Service number: 28042
- Commands: Teuku Umar Military Resort Command; Sriwijaya Regional Military Command

Lieutenant General (Ret.) Syarifudin Tippe (10 July 1953 – 14 February 2021) was a high-ranking Indonesian army general. He was Commander of the Teuku Umar Military Resort from 1999 until 2002, Commander of the Sriwijaya Regional Military Command from 2006 until 2010, and was Rector of the Defence University from 2011 until his retirement in 2012.

== Early life and education ==
Syarifudin was born on 10 July 1953 in Sinjai, South Sulawesi. After graduating from high school, Syarifuddin entered the Armed Forces Academy in 1972. He graduated from the academy with the rank of second lieutenant on 16 December 1975.

== Military career ==
=== Officer commands ===
Following his graduation, Syarifudin was posted to the 6th Combat Engineers Battle Detachment in Anjungan, West Kalimantan, where he became the commander of a company in the detachment. Syarifudin rose through the ranks in the detachment, becoming the battalion commander in 1977, intelligence officer in 1979, and as the deputy commander of the detachment in 1980. Syarifudin became the acting commander of the detachment in 1981 following the resignation of its previous commander.

Syarifudin served as acting commander for three years, until he was transferred to the combat engineers section in the Tanjungpura Regional Military Command (RMC) in 1984. Syarifudin moved from Kalimantan to Jakarta in 1986 and taught at the General Military Department until 1987 and at the Combat Engineers Education Center from 1987 until 1988. From there, Syarifudin was posted to the Diponegoro Regional Military Command and became the deputy commander of the RMC's combat engineer battalion.

After three years in the battalion, Syarifudin was instructed to enroll at a regular course in the Indonesian Army Command and General Staff College. He graduated in 1990 as one of the course's best graduate. Syarifudin then received a promotion to lieutenant colonel and returned to his old office as a lecturer in the Combat Engineers Education Center. Syarifuddin was then again transferred to Sriwijaya RMC combat engineer battalion in 1992 and became commander of the battalion.

In 1995, Syarifudin was posted to his former college and became a lecturer. Syarifudin only taught for two years, as in 1997 he was transferred to the Commander of the Armed Forces and became the coordinator for the commander's personal staffs. Syarifuddin also did not held this office for long, as on the same year he assumed office as the Commander of the Combat Engineers Education Center.

=== Commander of the Teuku Umar Military Resort ===
On 8 May 1999, Syarifudin was sworn in as the Commander of the Teuku Umar Military Resort in Aceh. During this period, the military resort's parent RMC, the Iskandar Muda RMC, has just been recently reestablished. The Teuku Umar Military Resort headquarters was transformed into the Iskandar Muda RMC's headquarters, and a new headquarters for the Teuku Umar Military Resort was built close to the RMC's headquarters.

=== Flag officer commands ===
Syarifudin ended his command at the Teuku Umar Military Resort on 7 April 2001 and was replaced by Colonel Endang Suwarya. Syarifudin was instructed to study in the National Resilience Institute afterwards, and he graduated from the institute in 2002. Syarifuddin was then put as the chief of staff of the Iskandar Muda RMC on 5 May 2002. Syarifudin held the office until 3 February 2003 and was posted to Jakarta to become the Deputy Commander of the Indonesian Army Command and General Staff College. Syarifuddin held the post for less than a year, as on 9 July 2003 he was promoted to commander of the college.

Following his three years of duty as the commander of the college, Syarifudin was transferred to the Sriwijaya RMC. He became the RMC's commander from 8 May 2006 until 5 December 2007. Syarifuddin then received his first assignment outside the army, where he became the Director General of Defence Strategy at the Ministry of Defence. Syarifuddin was decommissioned from his office on 6 August 2010. He received a promotion to lieutenant general on 18 May 2011 and became the Rector of the Defence University on 20 June. During his tenure as rector, Syarifudin was one of the seven flag officers who were eligible to become the Chief of Staff of the Army. However, his name was not submitted as a candidate by the incumbent army chief.

== Later life and death ==
Syarifudin resigned from the office of rector and concurrently retired from the military in 2012. After his retirement, Syarifudin became the Postgraduate Director at the Jayabaya University and a lecturer in the Jakarta State University.

In 2019, Syarifudin was named as a candidate for the Minister of Defence post in Joko Widodo's Onward Indonesia Cabinet.

Syarifudin died at 11.50 on 14 February 2021, in the Pondok Indah Hospital, Jakarta. Syarifuddin was buried on the same day at the Kalibata Heroes' Cemetery.

== Awards ==
- Grand Meritorious Military Order Star, 3rd Class (11 August 2009)
