= Singapore Armed Forces Overseas Scholarship =

Scholarship

The SAF Scholarship, formerly known as the SAF Overseas Scholarship (SAFOS), is a scholarship conferred by the Public Service Commission (PSC). The scholarship is second in prestige to the President's Scholarship.

Scholars are groomed for the highest levels of command and management in the Singapore Armed Forces (SAF) and beyond. They will generally do another post-graduate degree in Master of Business Administration (MBA), Master of Public Administration (MPA) or Master of Public Policy (MPP) overseas in the middle of their careers to prepare themselves for appointments beyond the SAF. Upon graduation, scholars go through different tour of duty from other cadet officers.

== Selection ==
The scholarship is awarded to certain officer cadets with a high A-Level or IB Diploma result, co-curricular activities and in the Officer Cadet School (OCS). Candidates must also graduate from Basic Military Training (BMT) and their Individual Physical Proficiency Test (IPPT) with an acceptable score.

After they are selected through rigorous rounds of interviews, scholars must complete and pass the 9-month Officer Cadet Course and receive their commission, before leaving for undergraduate studies. Medical or dentistry candidates will disrupt their cadet course for studies before returning for a 3-month Medical Officer Cadet Course (MOCC). Upon graduation, they will return to serve in the Singapore Armed Forces (SAF).

Their overseas studies typically takes place in the United Kingdom or United States. Popular choices amongst scholars include universities such as Imperial College London, University of Cambridge, University of Oxford, Harvard University, Massachusetts Institute of Technology, Stanford University, Princeton University, University of Chicago, and University of California, Berkeley.

== Career prospects ==
Graduates receive their promotion to the rank of Captain (CPT) after a year of returning to service, thereafter serve 2-year command/instructor/staff tours, typically reaching the rank of Lieutenant-Colonel (LTC) and receive their battalion command by their 12-year of service. They are rapidly promoted and given high salaries in order to maintain competitiveness.

Most scholars will go on to complete post-graduate qualifications in Public Administration or Engineering from the Ivy League or Oxbridge universities. It is also common for these scholars to be headhunted to join the private sector or inducted into political offices.

== Notable recipients ==
=== Politics ===
- Lee Hsien Loong, Former Prime Minister, Senior Minister
- Teo Chee Hean, Senior Minister
- Chan Chun Sing, Minister for Education
- Tan Chuan-Jin, Former Speaker of Parliament
- George Yeo, Former Minister for Foreign Affairs
- Lim Swee Say, Former Minister for Manpower
- Lim Hng Kiang, Former Minister for Trade and Industry
- Goh Pei Ming, Member of Parliament representing Marine Parade–Braddell Heights Group Representation Constituency

=== Military ===
- Aaron Beng, Chief of Defence Force
- Melvyn Ong, Former Chief of Defence Force
- Desmond Kuek, Former Chief of Defence Force
- Bey Soo Khiang, Former Chief of Defence Force
- Neo Kian Hong, Former Chief of Defence Force
- Perry Lim, Former Chief of Defence Force
- Lim Neo Chian, Former Chief of Army
- Ng Chee Khern, Former Chief of Air Force
- Lew Chuen Hong, Former Chief of Navy
- Ng Chee Peng, Former Chief of Navy
- Cai Dexian, Chief of Army

=== Public Service ===
- Lee Seow Hiang, Former Chief Executive of Changi Airport Group
- Peter Ho, Former Head of the Civil Service

== See also ==
- SAF Merit Scholarship (Women)
