= Singapore Armed Forces Overseas Service Medal =

- Medal and ribbon without (left) and with (right) Bronze Star
- Type: Medal
- Awarded for: Service outside of Singapore
- Presented by: Singapore
- Eligibility: Members of the Singapore Armed Forces
- Status: Active
- Established: 1973
- Ribbons prior to 1999 for operational service (left), and non-operational service (right)

Precedence
- Next (higher): Singapore Armed Forces Good Service Medal
- Next (lower): None

The Singapore Armed Forces Overseas Service Medal is awarded to a member of the SAF who was engaged in service in an area outside Singapore after 9 August 1970 which satisfies one or more of the following conditions:

- Service of 96 hours or more in operations;
- Aggregate service of 30 days or more, in a period of 12 months when employed in support of any unit engaged in operations;
- Service of 14 days or more when engaged in operations involving the keeping of peace, restoring of law and order, provision of humanitarian aid or rescue, or relief operations in support of any foreign government.

A bronze star is awarded if the service involves hostile action or considerable personal risk.

Prior to 1999, separate ribbons indicated service on Operational or Non-operational service.

== Description ==
- The ribbon is blue, with a green stripe on a central yellow stripe.
