= Pingat Pentadbiran Awam (Tentera) =

Singapore Armed Forces award

Pingat Jasa Gemilang (Tentera) (Public Administration Medal (Military))
- Ribbon
- Type: Medal
- Awarded for: Meritorious service in command or staff positions
- Presented by: Singapore
- Eligibility: Members of the Singapore Armed Forces
- Status: Active
- Established: 1981

Precedence
- Next (higher): Pingat Jasa Gemilang (Tentera)
- Next (lower): Pingat Penghargaan (Tentera)
- Related: Pingat Pentadbiran Awam

The Pingat Pentadbiran Awam (Tentera) (English: Public Administration Medal (Military)) is a decoration awarded to members of the Singapore Armed Forces for meritorious service in command or staff positions, and has three grades:

- Emas (Gold)
- Perak (Silver) (Bar)
- Perak (Silver)
- Gangsa (Bronze)

Recipients are entitled to use the post-nominal letters PPA, and may include the grade in brackets - e.g.: PPA(E).

The Pingat Pentadbiran Awam is the civil equivalent award.

== Description ==
- The ribbon is red with two white edge stripes.
