= Singapore Armed Forces Long Service and Good Conduct (10 Years) Medal =

Service award

SAF Long Service and Good Conduct (10 Years) Medal
- Ribbon
- Type: Medal
- Awarded for: 10 years service
- Presented by: Singapore
- Eligibility: Members of the Singapore Armed Forces
- Clasps: 'Fifteen Years'
- Status: Active
- Ribbon with 15 year clasp

Precedence
- Next (higher): Singapore Armed Forces Long Service and Good Conduct (20 Years) Medal
- Next (lower): Singapore Armed Forces Good Service Medal
- Related: Singapore Armed Forces National Service Medal

The Singapore Armed Forces Long Service and Good Conduct (10 Years) Medal is a decoration awarded to a member of the Singapore Armed Forces (SAF) who has completed 10 years of continuous service. For NSmen, reservists qualify for the equivalent Singapore Armed Forces National Service Medal.

A clasp is awarded for an additional 5 years of service, for a total of 15 years.

== Description ==
- The ribbon is brown, with three central white stripes.

== Service medals ==
In the SAF, the medals for service are:

- 5 years - Singapore Armed Forces Good Service Medal
- 10 years - Singapore Armed Forces Long Service and Good Conduct (10 Years) Medal
- 15 years - Singapore Armed Forces Long Service and Good Conduct (10 Years) Medal with 15 year clasp
- 20 years - Singapore Armed Forces Long Service and Good Conduct (20 Years) Medal
- 25 years - Long Service Medal (Military)
- 30 years - Singapore Armed Forces Long Service and Good Conduct (20 Years) Medal with 30 year clasp

== See also ==
- Singaporean orders and decorations
