= Singapore Armed Forces Long Service and Good Conduct (20 Years) Medal =

SAF Long Service and Good Conduct (20 Years) Medal
- Medal and ribbon
- Type: Medal
- Awarded for: 20 years service
- Presented by: Singapore
- Eligibility: Members of the Singapore Armed Forces
- Clasps: 'Thirty Year'
- Status: Active
- Ribbon with 30 year clasp

Precedence
- Next (higher): Long Service Medal (Military)
- Next (lower): Singapore Armed Forces Long Service and Good Conduct (10 Years) Medal

The Singapore Armed Forces Long Service and Good Conduct (20 Years) Medal is a decoration awarded to a member of the Singapore Armed Forces (SAF) (regardless of regular or NSmen status) who has completed 20 years of continuous service.

A clasp is awarded for an additional 10 years of service, for a total of 30 years.

== Description ==
- The ribbon is brown, with two thick central white stripes and three sets of four thin white stripes surrounding them.

== Service medals ==
In the SAF, the medals for service are:

- 5 years - Singapore Armed Forces Good Service Medal
- 10 years - Singapore Armed Forces Long Service and Good Conduct (10 Years) Medal
- 15 years - Singapore Armed Forces Long Service and Good Conduct (10 Years) Medal with 15 year clasp
- 20 years - Singapore Armed Forces Long Service and Good Conduct (20 Years) Medal
- 25 years - Long Service Medal (Military)
- 30 years - Singapore Armed Forces Long Service and Good Conduct (20 Years) Medal with 30 year clasp

== See also ==
- Singaporean orders and decorations
