= Singapore Armed Forces Good Service Medal =

SAF Good Service Medal
- Ribbon
- Type: Medal
- Awarded for: 5 years service
- Presented by: Singapore
- Eligibility: Members of the Singapore Armed Forces
- Status: Active

Precedence
- Next (higher): Singapore Armed Forces Long Service and Good Conduct (10 Years) Medal

The Singapore Armed Forces Good Service Medal is awarded to a regular career soldier of the Singapore Armed Forces (SAF) who has satisfactorily completed 5 years of dedicated service.

The medal may be awarded to NSmen who have served 2 years of National Service Full-time (NSF) and at least 3 high-key In-Camp Training (ICT) served satisfactorily as NSmen. The criteria are based on a reservist's good attitude towards National Service, in-camp training competency performance and meaningful contributions to the SAF.

== Description ==
- The ribbon is orange, with two white stripes.

== Service medals ==
In the SAF, the medals for service are:

- 5 years - Singapore Armed Forces Good Service Medal
- 10 years - Singapore Armed Forces Long Service and Good Conduct (10 Years) Medal
- 15 years - Singapore Armed Forces Long Service and Good Conduct (10 Years) Medal with 15 year clasp
- 20 years - Singapore Armed Forces Long Service and Good Conduct (20 Years) Medal
- 25 years - Long Service Medal (Military)
- 30 years - Singapore Armed Forces Long Service and Good Conduct (20 Years) Medal with 30 year clasp
