= Singapore Armed Forces order of precedence =

Parade order of the Singaporean army

For the purposes of parading, the Unit and Formation Regimental Colours of the Singapore Armed Forces (SAF) are arranged according to an order of protocol. This is the order in which the 36 Regimental Colours of the Singapore Armed Forces parade. The oldest Colours is placed on the left of the observer, and the sequence follows, with the youngest Colours taking the last position on the right. There are exceptions to this rule in the Singapore context, such as the placement of the Regimental Colours of the Commandos. SAFTI MI and Commandos Regimental Colours do not observe the order-by-date-of grant arrangement. These Colours precede the SAF's first Regimental Colours (1SIR - 27 July 1961), despite being granted on a later date.

In Air Force and Navy parades, the respective Regimental Colours of these two services will be paraded in a similar order as listed below excluding those of the Army and joint-service units/formations.

The order of precedence for the 2025 National Day Parade was:

- SAFTI Military Institute
- Headquarters, Commandos
- 1st Commando Battalion
- 1st Battalion, Singapore Guards
- 3rd Battalion, Singapore Guards
- 1st Battalion, Singapore Infantry Regiment
- 2nd Battalion, Singapore Infantry Regiment
- 3rd Battalion, Singapore Infantry Regiment
- 5th Battalion, Singapore Infantry Regiment
- 8th Battalion, Singapore Infantry Regiment
- 9th Battalion, Singapore Infantry Regiment
- 40th Battalion, Singapore Armoured Regiment
- 41st Battalion, Singapore Armoured Regiment
- 42nd Battalion, Singapore Armoured Regiment
- 48th Battalion, Singapore Armoured Regiment
- Headquarters, Singapore Artillery
- Headquarters, Singapore Combat Engineers
- Headquarters, Signals and Command Systems
- Headquarters, Maintenance and Engineering Support
- Singapore Armed Forces Military Police Command
- Headquarters, Supply
- Headquarters, Transport
- SAF Ammunition Command
- Army Intelligence
- Army Deployment Force
- RSN Headquarters Fleet
- RSN Naval Diving Unit
- RSN Maritime Security Task Force
- RSN Naval Engineering and Logistics Command
- RSAF Air Defence and Operations Command
- RSAF Air Combat Command
- RSAF Air Power Generation Command
- RSAF Participation Command
- RSAF Unmanned Aerial Vehicle Command
- DIS Imagery Support Group
- Headquarters, Medical Corps
