= List of Singapore Armed Forces bases =

The following is a list of the camps and bases of the Singapore Armed Forces.

== Singapore Army camps ==
Name	Location	Unit(s)
Amoy Quee Camp	Ang Mo Kio	HQ National Cadet Corps (HQ NCC); HQ 3rd Division Artillery (HQ 3 DIV ARTY)
Bedok Camp	Tanah Merah	HQ 7th Singapore Infantry Brigade (HQ 7 SIB); 3rd Battalion, Singapore Guards (3 GDS); Guards Light Strike Company (Recce / ATGM support to Guards Bn's); Bedok Fitness and Conditioning Centre (Bedok FCC)
Clementi Camp	Clementi	HQ 2nd People's Defence Force (HQ 2 PDF); Island Defence Training Institute (IDTI); 15th Command, Control, Communications, Computers and Intelligence Battalion (15 C4I); 8th Battalion, Singapore Infantry Regiment (8 SIR)
Depot Road Camp	Bukit Merah	Defence Science and Technology Agency (DSTA)
Dieppe Barracks	Yishun	HQ Guards (HQ GDS); 1st Battalion, Singapore Guards (1 GDS)
Gombak Base	Bukit Batok	Ministry of Defence (MINDEF); Central Manpower Base (CMPB)
Hendon Camp	Changi	1st Commando Battalion (1 CDO)
Jurong Camp I	Jurong West	HQ 3rd Division (HQ 3 DIV); 17th Command, Control, Communications, Computers and Intelligence Battalion (17 C4I); 3rd Army Maintenance Base (3 AMB); 30th Battalion, Singapore Combat Engineers (30 SCE)
Jurong Camp II	Jurong West	Infantry Training Institute (ITI)
Kaki Bukit Camp	Kaki Bukit	SAF Driving School
Keat Hong Camp	Western Water Catchment	HQ 8th Singapore Armoured Brigade (HQ 8 SAB); 40th Battalion, Singapore Armoured Regiment (40 SAR); 41st Battalion, Singapore Armoured Regiment (41 SAR)
Khatib Camp	Yishun	HQ Singapore Artillery (HQ SA); Artillery Institute (AI); 23rd Battalion, Singapore Artillery (23 SA); 24th Battalion, Singapore Artillery (24 SA); Khatib Fitness and Conditioning Centre (Khatib FCC)
Mowbray Camp	Yew Tee	SAF Military Police Command (SAF MP COMD); SAF Detention Barracks (SAFDB)
Kranji Camp II	Yew Tee	21st Battalion, Singapore Artillery (21 SA); Singapore Armed Forces Court-Martial Centre; Motorised Infantry Training Institute (MTI); Basic Military Training Centre School V (BMTC Sch 5); Kranji Fitness and Conditioning Centre (Kranji FCC)
Kranji Camp III	Yew Tee	HQ Combat Service Support Command (HQ CSSCOM); HQ Maintenance and Engineering Support (HQ MES); HQ Supply (HQ SUP); HQ Transport (HQ TPT); HQ SAF Ammunition Command (HQ SAFAC); Army Logistics Training Institute (ALTI); HQ 3rd Division Support Command (HQ 3 DISCOM); 9th Army Maintenance Base (9 AMB); Supply Base Central (SBC); HQ 3rd Singapore Infantry Brigade (HQ 3 SIB); 2nd Battalion, Singapore Infantry Regiment (2 SIR); 5th Battalion, Singapore Infantry Regiment (5 SIR)
Ladang Camp	Pulau Tekong	HQ Basic Military Training Centre (HQ BMTC); Basic Military Training Centre School I (BMTC Sch 1); Basic Military Training Centre School II (BMTC Sch 2); Basic Military Training Centre School III (BMTC Sch 3)
Rocky Hill Camp	Pulau Tekong	Basic Military Training Centre School IV (BMTC Sch 4)
Maju Camp	Clementi	HQ SAF Volunteer Corps (HQ SAFVC); HQ 24th Singapore Infantry Brigade (HQ 24 SIB); 9th Battalion, Singapore Infantry Regiment (9 SIR)
Mandai Hill Camp	Mandai	HQ 6th Division (HQ 6 DIV); 6th Signal Battalion (6 SIG); HQ 2nd Singapore Infantry Brigade (HQ 2 SIB); 11th Command, Control, Communications, Computers and Intelligence Battalion (11 C4I); 16th Command, Control, Communications, Computers and Intelligence Battalion (16 C4I)
Nee Soon Camp	Yishun	Army Deployment Force (ADF); HQ SAF Medical Corps (HQ SAFMC); HQ Army Medical Services (HQ AMS); SAF Medical Training Institute (SMTI); HQ Singapore Combat Engineers (HQ SCE); Engineer Training Institute (ETI); HQ SAF Chemical, Biological, Radiological and Explosive Defence Group (HQ SAF CBRE DG); 36th Battalion, Singapore Combat Engineers (36 SCE); 39th Battalion, Singapore Combat Engineers (39 SCE); SAF Band; SAF Music and Drama Company (SAF MDC)
Nee Soon Driclad Centre	Yishun	HQ 22nd Singapore Infantry Brigade (HQ 22 SIB); 6th Army Maintenance Base (6 AMB); Supply Base North (SBN)
Pasir Laba Camp	Jurong West	Army Training and Doctrine Command (HQ TRADOC); Training Resource Management Centre (TRMC); Army Training Evaluation Centre (ATEC); Specialist and Warrant Officer Institute (SWI); Specialist Cadet Schools (SCS I, SCS II, SCS III); Specialist and Warrant Officer Advanced School (SWAS); SAFWOS Leadership School (SAFWOS); SAF Military Intelligence Institute (SMI-I); 1st Battalion, Singapore Infantry Regiment (1 SIR); Army Fitness Centre (AFC); Basic Combat Training Centre (BCTC)
Pasir Ris Camp	Pasir Ris	Commando Training Institute (CDO TI)
Rifle Range Road Camp	Bukit Timah	General Support Ammunition Base (GSAB)
SAFTI Military Institute	Jurong West	Military Institute Headquarters (MI HQ); Officer Cadet School (OCS); SAF Advanced Schools; Goh Keng Swee Command and Staff College (GKSCSC); Centre for Learning and Military Education (CLME); Service Support Unit (SSU); Singapore Armed Forces Centre of Leadership Development (CLD)
Selarang Camp	Changi	HQ 9th Division/Infantry (HQ 9 DIV/INF); 3rd Battalion, Singapore Infantry Regiment (3 SIR); Supply Base East (SBE)
Seletar Camp	Seletar	HQ Army Combat Engineers Group (HQ ARMCEG); 35th Battalion, Singapore Combat Engineers (35 SCE)
Sembawang Camp	Sembawang	Naval Diving Unit (NDU); Supply and Transport School (STS); 1st SAF Transport Battalion (1 SAF TPT BN); 3rd SAF Transport Battalion (3 SAF TPT BN)
Stagmont Camp	Choa Chu Kang	HQ Signals and Command Systems (HQ SCS); Signal Institute (SI); 10th Command, Control, Communications, Computers and Intelligence Battalion (10 C4I)
Sungei Gedong Camp	Western Water Catchment	HQ Armour; Armour Training Institute (ATI); HQ 4th Singapore Armoured Brigade (HQ 4 SAB); 12th Command, Control, Communications, Computers and Intelligence Battalion (12 C4I); 42nd Battalion, Singapore Armoured Regiment (42 SAR); 48th Battalion, Singapore Armoured Regiment (48 SAR); 38th Battalion, Singapore Combat Engineers (38 SCE); 1st Army Maintenance Base (1 AMB); Supply Base West (SBW)

== Republic of Singapore Navy bases ==
Name	Location	Unit(s)
Changi Naval Base	Changi	171 Squadron (171 SQN); Changi Defence Squadron (CDS)
Tuas Naval Base	Tuas	HQ Fleet; HQ NALCOM; Tuas Defence Squadron (TDS)

== Republic of Singapore Air Force bases ==
Name	Location	Unit(s)
Changi Air Base	Changi	112 Squadron (112 SQN); 121 Squadron (121 SQN); 208 Squadron (208 SQN); 508 Squadron (508 SQN); 608 Squadron (608 SQN); 708 Squadron (708 SQN); 808 Squadron (808 SQN)
Choa Chu Kang Camp	Western Water Catchment	201 Squadron (201 SQN)
Chong Pang Camp	Yishun	165 Squadron (165 SQN); 3rd Divisional Air Defence Artillery Battalion (3 DA Bn); 6th Divisional Air Defence Artillery Battalion (6 DA Bn); 9th Divisional Air Defence Artillery Battalion (9 DA Bn); 18th Divisional Air Defence Artillery Battalion (18 DA Bn); 809 Squadron (809 SQN); 819 Squadron (819 SQN); HQ Participation Command (HQ PC)
Lim Chu Kang Camp II	Western Water Catchment	160 Squadron (160 SQN); 163 Squadron (163 SQN)
Murai Camp	Western Water Catchment	119 Squadron (119 SQN); 128 Squadron (128 SQN)
Paya Lebar Air Base	Paya Lebar	122 Squadron (122 SQN); 142 Squadron (142 SQN); 149 Squadron (149 SQN); 207 Squadron (207 SQN); 507 Squadron (507 SQN); 607 Squadron (607 SQN); 707 Squadron (707 SQN); 807 Squadron (807 SQN); 817 Squadron (817 SQN)
Sembawang Air Base	Yishun	120 Squadron (120 SQN); 123 Squadron (123 SQN); 125 Squadron (125 SQN); 126 Squadron (126 SQN); 127 Squadron (127 SQN); 206 Squadron (206 SQN); 506 Squadron (506 SQN); 606 Squadron (606 SQN); 706 Squadron (706 SQN); 806 Squadron (806 SQN); 816 Squadron (816 SQN)
Seletar Airport	Seletar	124 Squadron (124 SQN)
Tengah Air Base	Tengah	111 Squadron (111 SQN); 116 Squadron (116 SQN); 140 Squadron (140 SQN); 143 Squadron (143 SQN); 145 Squadron (145 SQN); 205 Squadron (205 SQN); 505 Squadron (505 SQN); 605 Squadron (605 SQN); 705 Squadron (705 SQN); 805 Squadron (805 SQN); 815 Squadron (815 SQN); RSAF Black Knights
