= Singapore Army =

Land service branch of the Singapore Armed Forces

- Tentera Singapura (Malay) 新加坡陆军 (Chinese) சிங்கப்பூர் தரைப்படை (Tamil)
- Crest of the Singapore Army
- Founded: 12 March 1957; 69 years ago
- Country: Singapore
- Type: Army
- Role: Land warfare
- Size: 40,000 active personnel 240,000 reserve personnel
- Part of: Singapore Armed Forces
- Mottos: Yang Pertama dan Utama The First and Foremost (English)
- March: Tentera Singapura
- Equipment: See list
- Engagements: See list: Konfrontasi UNIKOM UNSMA INTERFET Multi-National Force – Iraq Operation Enduring Freedom ISAF Operation Inherent Resolve
- Website: Official website

Commanders
- President of Singapore: Tharman Shanmugaratnam
- Minister for Defence: Chan Chun Sing
- Chief of Defence Force: VADM Aaron Beng
- Chief of Army: MG Cai Dexian
- Chief of Staff – General Staff: BG Wong Shi Ming
- Sergeant Major of the Army: CWO Chua Hong Hup

Insignia
- Flag

- Logo

The Singapore Army is the land service branch of the Singapore Armed Forces (SAF). The Singapore Army, which is the largest of the four branches of the SAF, traces its origins to the 1st Battalion, Singapore Infantry Regiment (1 SIR), which was formed in 1957, under British colonial rule. After Singapore's independence on 9 August 1965, the Singapore Army Bill was passed in Parliament on 23 December 1965, and National Service (NS) was subsequently introduced in 1967. Mostly made up of conscripts, the Singapore Army can mobilise all operationally-ready military reservists in the event of war or national exigencies.

== Mission ==
The mission of the Singapore Armed Forces (SAF) is to deter armed aggression, and to secure a swift and decisive victory should deterrence fail. The Army is also tasked with conducting peace-time operations to further Singapore's national interests and foreign policy. These range from disaster relief to peacekeeping, hostage rescue and other contingencies.

The Army views technology as a force-multiplier and a means to sustain combat power given Singapore's population constraints. Jointness across four branches of the SAF is integral to the Army's warfighting doctrine. Joint operations undertaken with the Navy and Air Force include amphibious landings and critical disaster relief operations in the aftermath of the 2004 Indian Ocean earthquake and tsunami.

The Army's personnel are generally technically proficient and relatively well educated, reflecting the broader population. It has sought to use these characteristics to support its transition to a more sophisticated and networked fighting force.

Combat readiness is a linchpin of Army policy, and military exercises up to divisional level are conducted many times yearly, simulating full-spectrum operations, up to and including full-scale war. Divisional war games are a combined arms, tri-service affair involving the Navy and Air Force. Because training space is limited in Singapore—artillery fire would quickly traverse the island—some military exercises are conducted overseas. Reservists periodically train abroad, their units regularly evaluated for combat readiness. The Army also trains bilaterally with some host nations, and military exchanges are frequent. Training is billed as "tough, realistic and safe," with a premium on safety, given the sensitivity of military deaths in a largely conscript army.

Following the revolution in military affairs, and in tandem with modernising its weapons systems, the Army is forging a transition to a more network-centric fighting doctrine that better integrates the Air Force and Navy.

== History ==
The Singapore Army originated with two infantry battalions, the 1st and 2nd Battalions, Singapore Infantry Regiment (1 SIR and 2 SIR), which were respectively formed in 1957 and 1962 when Singapore was still a British colony. After a merger with Malaysia which resulted in separation in 1965, Singapore passed the Singapore Army Bill in Parliament on 23 December 1965 and gained complete control of the two battalions from Malaysia in January 1966. At the time, the Singapore Army had only the two infantry battalions and the old Singapore Volunteer Artillery Corps. Months later, the Army had a reserve force, the People's Defence Force, which was formed from an old volunteer unit mobilised for service during the Indonesia–Malaysia confrontation. A third battalion, the 10th Battalion, People's Defence Force (10 PDF), was raised as a volunteer infantry reserve battalion.

In 1967, Parliament passed the National Service (Amendment) Act, introducing National Service (conscription) for all able-bodied young men aged 18 and above. In June 1967, the Singapore Army introduced its first artillery battalion, the 20th Singapore Artillery Battalion (20 SAB). Two new infantry battalions, the 3rd and 4th Battalions, Singapore Infantry Regiment (3 SIR and 4 SIR) were formed in August 1967. In November 1968, the Singapore Army's first armoured battalion, 41st Battalion, Singapore Armoured Regiment (41 SAR), was formed. This was followed by the creation of the 1st Commando Battalion (1 Cdo Bn) in December 1969.

In 1972, Parliament passed the Singapore Armed Forces Act to reorganise and consolidate the Singapore Armed Forces' disparate commands and administrative functions.

=== Description of logo ===
The emblem's escutcheon reads "Tentera Singapura" (meaning "Singapore Army" in Malay). The national coat of arms sits in its interior. The motto is "Yang Pertama Dan Utama" ("first and foremost" in Malay). Two stalks of laurel flank the escutcheon. The laurels are green for the Singapore Army and gold for the Singapore Armed Forces.

== Operations ==
The Singapore Army has participated in peacekeeping operations overseas. In the aftermath of the Gulf War, Singapore contributed to the United Nations Iraq–Kuwait Observation Mission (UNIKOM) formed in 1991. From May 2007 to June 2013, the Singapore Army deployed about 500 personnel to join the International Security Assistance Force (ISAF) in maintaining stability and assist in reconstruction in war-torn Afghanistan. Since 2014, the Singapore Army has provided logistical support to the international coalition in the War against the Islamic State.

== List of chiefs of Army ==
Years in office	Name	Vocation
1990	Boey Tak Hap	Infantry
1990–1992	Ng Jui Ping	Artillery
1992–1995	Lim Neo Chian	Combat Engineers
1995–1998	Han Eng Juan	Armour
1998–2000	Lim Chuan Poh	Infantry
2000–2003	Ng Yat Chung	Artillery
2003–2007	Desmond Kuek	Armour
2007–2010	Neo Kian Hong	Guards
2010–2011	Chan Chun Sing	Infantry
2011–2014	Ravinder Singh	Signals
2014–2015	Perry Lim	Guards
2015–2018	Melvyn Ong	Guards
2018–2022	Goh Si Hou	Artillery
2022–2025	David Neo	Commandos
2025–present	Cai Dexian	Armour

== Organisation ==
Singapore Army

Components
Organisation
History and Traditions
Military history of Singapore
Equipment
Weapons of the Singapore Army
Personnel
Singapore Armed Forces ranks

Singapore Army – major combat units

The Army is headed by the Chief of Army, who is assisted by the Chief of Staff – General Staff and the Sergeant Major of the Army. The General Staff consists of six branches from G1 to G6, as well as a National Service Affairs Department handling National Service issues, and an Army Safety Inspectorate. The six branches handle issues relating to personnel (G1), intelligence (G2), operations (G3), logistics (G4), plans (G5) and training (G6). The G1, G2, G3, G5, and G6 branches are each headed by an Assistant Chief of General Staff. Among the General Staff, there is also a Chief Systems Integration Officer and a Head of the Army Information Centre.

The commanders of Training & Doctrine Command (TRADOC), Combat Service Support (CSS), the four main divisions, the two operational reserve divisions, the 15 formations of the Army, and the SAF Volunteer Corps also report to the Chief of Army.

=== Divisions ===
The Army has six divisions, of which three are combined arms divisions, one is in charge of counter-terrorism and homeland security, and two are army operational reserves (AOR).

The three combined arms divisions are the 3rd Division (3 DIV), 6th Division (6 DIV) and 9th Division (9 DIV), each of which has active and reserve units that are operationally ready and capable of being mobilised in the event of war.

3rd Singapore Division (3 Div):

- 3rd Singapore Infantry Brigade (3 SIB)
  - 2nd Battalion, Singapore Infantry Regiment (2 SIR)
  - 5th Battalion, Singapore Infantry Regiment (5 SIR)
  - 754th Battalion, Singapore Infantry Regiment (754 SIR)
  - 746th Battalion, Singapore Infantry Regiment (746 SIR)
- 5th Singapore Infantry Brigade (5 SIB)
  - 778th Battalion, Singapore Infantry Regiment (778 SIR)
  - 789th Battalion, Singapore Infantry Regiment (789 SIR)
  - 798th Battalion, Singapore Infantry Regiment (798 SIR)
- 24th Singapore Infantry Brigade (24 SIB)
  - 733rd Battalion, Singapore Infantry Regiment (733 SIR)
  - 761st Battalion, Singapore Infantry Regiment (761 SIR)
  - 786th Battalion, Singapore Infantry Regiment (786 SIR)
- 8th Singapore Armoured Brigade (8 SAB)
  - 40th Battalion, Singapore Armoured Regiment (40 SAR)
  - 41st Battalion, Singapore Armoured Regiment (41 SAR)
  - 489th Battalion, Singapore Armoured Regiment (489 SAR)
- 3rd Division Artillery
  - 21st Battalions SA
  - 290th Battalions SA
  - 223rd Battalions SA
- 3rd Division Support Command
  - 31st Combat Service Support Battalion
  - 32nd Combat Service Support Battalion
  - 33rd Combat Service Support Battalion
  - 38th Combat Service Support Battalion
- 30th Battalion, Singapore Combat Engineers (30SCE)
- 321st Battalion, Singapore Combat Engineers (321SCE)
- 17th C4I Battalion (17 C4I Bn)
- 3rd Divisional Air Defence Artillery Battalion
- 3rd ISTAR Battalion

6th Singapore Division / Headquarters Sense and Strike (6 Div/HQ SS):

- Headquarters Singapore Artillery (HQ SA)
- Headquarters Army Intelligence (HQ AI)
- 9th Singapore Infantry Brigade (9 SIB)
- 76th Singapore Infantry Brigade (76 SIB)
- 6th Division Artillery (6 Div Arty)
- 6th Division Support Command (6 DISCOM)
- 6th Signal Battalion (6 Sig Bn)
- 6th Division Engineers
- 6th Divisional Air Defence Artillery Battalion (6 DA Bn)
- 11th C4I Battalion (11 C4I Bn)

9th Singapore Division / Infantry (9 Div/Inf):

- 2nd Singapore Infantry Brigade (2 SIB)
- 10th Singapore Infantry Brigade (10 SIB)
- 12th Singapore Infantry Brigade (12 SIB)
- 23rd Singapore Infantry Brigade (23 SIB)
- 54th Singapore Armoured Brigade (54 SAB)
- 9th Division Artillery (9 Div Arty)
- 9th Division Support Command (9 DISCOM)
- 9th Signal Battalion (9 Sig Bn)
- 327th Battalion, Singapore Combat Engineers (327 SCE)
- 9th Divisional Air Defence Artillery Battalion (9 DA Bn)
- 16th Command, Control, Communications and Intelligence Battalion (16 C4I Bn)

2nd People’s Defence Force / Island Defence Task Force (2 PDF/IDTF):

- SAF Military Police Command
- 21st Singapore Infantry Brigade (21 SIB)
- 22nd Singapore Infantry Brigade (22 SIB)
- 26th Singapore Infantry Brigade (26 SIB)
- 27th Singapore Infantry Brigade (27 SIB)
- 29th Singapore Infantry Brigade (29 SIB)
- 32nd Singapore Infantry Brigade (32 SIB)
- 326th Battalion, Singapore Combat Engineers (326 SCE)
- 329th Battalion, Singapore Combat Engineers (329 SCE)
- 15th Command, Control, Communications and Intelligence Battalion (15 C4I Bn)

The 2nd People's Defence Force (2 PDF) is in charge of counter-terrorism and homeland security, including the protection of key military and civilian installations around Singapore. It is also responsible for the coordination and secondment of military resources to civilian agencies in the event of a civil emergency.

The two AOR divisions are the 21st Division (21 DIV) and 25th Division (25 DIV).

21st Singapore Division:

- 7th Singapore Infantry Brigade
- 13th Singapore Infantry Brigade
- 15th Singapore Infantry Brigade
- Divisional Artillery
- 21st Signal Battalion
- 21st Divisional Support Command
- 18th Divisional Air Defense Artillery Battalion
- 1 Combat Engineer Battalion

25th Singapore Division:

25th Division is a reserve division commanded by Chief Armour Officer

- 4th Singapore Armoured Brigade
- 11th Singapore Infantry Brigade
- 14th Singapore Infantry Brigade
- 63rd Singapore Infantry Brigade
- 65th Singapore Infantry Brigade
- 12th Command, Control, Communications and Intelligence Battalion (12 C4I Bn)

=== Formations ===
The Army has 16 formations: Armour, Army Intelligence, Army Medical Service, Commandos, Guards, Infantry, Maintenance and Engineering Support, PERSCOM, SAF Ammunition Command, SAF Military Police Command, SAF Volunteer Corps, Signals, Singapore Artillery, Singapore Combat Engineers, Supply, and Transport.

=== Task forces ===
The Army has task forces such as the Island Defence Task Force (IDTF), Joint Task Force (JTF), Special Operations Task Force (SOTF) and the Army Deployment Force (ADF).

== Camps and bases ==
Name	Location	Unit(s)
Amoy Quee Camp	Ang Mo Kio	HQ National Cadet Corps (HQ NCC); HQ 3rd Division Artillery (HQ 3 DIV ARTY)
Bedok Camp	Tanah Merah	HQ 7th Singapore Infantry Brigade (HQ 7 SIB); 3rd Battalion, Singapore Guards (3 GDS); Bedok Fitness and Conditioning Centre (Bedok FCC)
Clementi Camp	Clementi	HQ 2nd People's Defence Force (HQ 2 PDF); Island Defence Training Institute (IDTI); 15th Command, Control, Communications, Computers and Intelligence Battalion (15 C4I); 8th Battalion, Singapore Infantry Regiment (8 SIR)
Depot Road Camp	Bukit Merah	Defence Science and Technology Agency (DSTA)
Dieppe Barracks	Yishun	1st Battalion, Singapore Guards (1 GDS)
Gombak Base	Bukit Batok	Ministry of Defence (MINDEF)
Hendon Camp	Changi	1st Commando Battalion (1 CDO)
Jurong Camp I	Jurong West	HQ 3rd Division (HQ 3 DIV); 17th Command, Control, Communications, Computers and Intelligence Battalion (17 C4I); 3rd Army Maintenance Base (3 AMB); 30th Battalion, Singapore Combat Engineers (30 SCE)
Jurong Camp II	Jurong West	Infantry Training Institute (ITI)
Kaki Bukit Camp	Kaki Bukit	SAF Driving School
Keat Hong Camp	Western Water Catchment	HQ 8th Singapore Armoured Brigade (HQ 8 SAB); 40th Battalion, Singapore Armoured Regiment (40 SAR); 41st Battalion, Singapore Armoured Regiment (41 SAR)
Mowbray Camp	Yew Tee	SAF Military Police Command (SAF MP COMD); SAF Detention Barracks (SAFDB)
Kranji Camp II	Yew Tee	21st Battalion, Singapore Artillery (21 SA); Singapore Armed Forces Court-Martial Centre; Motorised Infantry Training Institute (MTI); Basic Military Training Centre School V (BMTC Sch 5); Kranji Fitness and Conditioning Centre (Kranji FCC)
Kranji Camp III	Yew Tee	HQ Combat Service Support Command (HQ CSSCOM); HQ Maintenance and Engineering Support (HQ MES); HQ Supply (HQ SUP); HQ Transport (HQ TPT); HQ SAF Ammunition Command (HQ SAFAC); Army Logistics Training Institute (ALTI); HQ 3rd Division Support Command (HQ 3 DISCOM); 9th Army Maintenance Base (9 AMB); Supply Base Central (SBC); HQ 3rd Singapore Infantry Brigade (HQ 3 SIB); 2nd Battalion, Singapore Infantry Regiment (2 SIR); 5th Battalion, Singapore Infantry Regiment (5 SIR)
Ladang Camp	Pulau Tekong	HQ Basic Military Training Centre (HQ BMTC); Basic Military Training Centre School I (BMTC Sch 1); Basic Military Training Centre School II (BMTC Sch 2); Basic Military Training Centre School III (BMTC Sch 3)
Rocky Hill Camp	Pulau Tekong	Basic Military Training Centre School IV (BMTC Sch 4)
Maju Camp	Clementi	HQ SAF Volunteer Corps (HQ SAFVC); HQ 24th Singapore Infantry Brigade (HQ 24 SIB); 9th Battalion, Singapore Infantry Regiment (9 SIR); Maju Fitness and Conditioning Centre (Maju FCC)
Mandai Hill Camp	Mandai	HQ 6th Division (HQ 6 DIV); 6th Signal Battalion (6 SIG); HQ 2nd Singapore Infantry Brigade (HQ 2 SIB); 11th Command, Control, Communications, Computers and Intelligence Battalion (11 C4I); 16th Command, Control, Communications, Computers and Intelligence Battalion (16 C4I)
Nee Soon Camp	Yishun	Army Deployment Force (ADF); HQ SAF Medical Corps (HQ SAFMC); HQ Army Medical Services (HQ AMS); SAF Medical Training Institute (SMTI); HQ Singapore Combat Engineers (HQ SCE); Engineer Training Institute (ETI); HQ SAF Chemical, Biological, Radiological and Explosive Defence Group (HQ SAF CBRE DG); 36th Battalion, Singapore Combat Engineers (36 SCE); 39th Battalion, Singapore Combat Engineers (39 SCE); SAF Band; SAF Music and Drama Company (SAF MDC)
Nee Soon Driclad Centre	Yishun	HQ 22nd Singapore Infantry Brigade (HQ 22 SIB); 6th Army Maintenance Base (6 AMB); Supply Base North (SBN)
Pasir Laba Camp	Jurong West	Army Training and Doctrine Command (HQ TRADOC); Training Resource Management Centre (TRMC); Army Training Evaluation Centre (ATEC); Specialist and Warrant Officer Institute (SWI); Specialist Cadet Schools (SCS I, SCS II, SCS III); Specialist and Warrant Officer Advanced School (SWAS); SAFWOS Leadership School (SAFWOS); SAF Military Intelligence Institute (SMI-I); 1st Battalion, Singapore Infantry Regiment (1 SIR); Army Fitness Centre (AFC); Basic Combat Training Centre (BCTC)
Pasir Ris Camp	Pasir Ris	Commando Training Institute (CDO TI)
Rifle Range Road Camp	Bukit Timah	General Support Ammunition Base (GSAB)
SAFTI Military Institute	Jurong West	Military Institute Headquarters (MI HQ); Officer Cadet School (OCS); SAF Advanced Schools; Goh Keng Swee Command and Staff College (GKSCSC); Centre for Learning and Military Education (CLME); Service Support Unit (SSU); Singapore Armed Forces Centre of Leadership Development (CLD)
Selarang Camp	Changi	HQ 9th Division/Infantry (HQ 9 DIV/INF); 3rd Battalion, Singapore Infantry Regiment (3 SIR); Supply Base East (SBE)
Seletar Camp	Seletar	HQ Army Combat Engineers Group (HQ ARMCEG); 35th Battalion, Singapore Combat Engineers (35 SCE)
Sembawang Camp	Sembawang	Naval Diving Unit (NDU); Supply and Transport School (STS); 1st SAF Transport Battalion (1 SAF TPT BN); 3rd SAF Transport Battalion (3 SAF TPT BN)
Stagmont Camp	Choa Chu Kang	HQ Signals and Command Systems (HQ SCS); Signal Institute (SI); 10th Command, Control, Communications, Computers and Intelligence Battalion (10 C4I)
Sungei Gedong Camp	Western Water Catchment	HQ Armour; Armour Training Institute (ATI); HQ 4th Singapore Armoured Brigade (HQ 4 SAB); 12th Command, Control, Communications, Computers and Intelligence Battalion (12 C4I); 42nd Battalion, Singapore Armoured Regiment (42 SAR); 48th Battalion, Singapore Armoured Regiment (48 SAR); 38th Battalion, Singapore Combat Engineers (38 SCE); 1st Army Maintenance Base (1 AMB); Supply Base West (SBW)

== Photo gallery ==
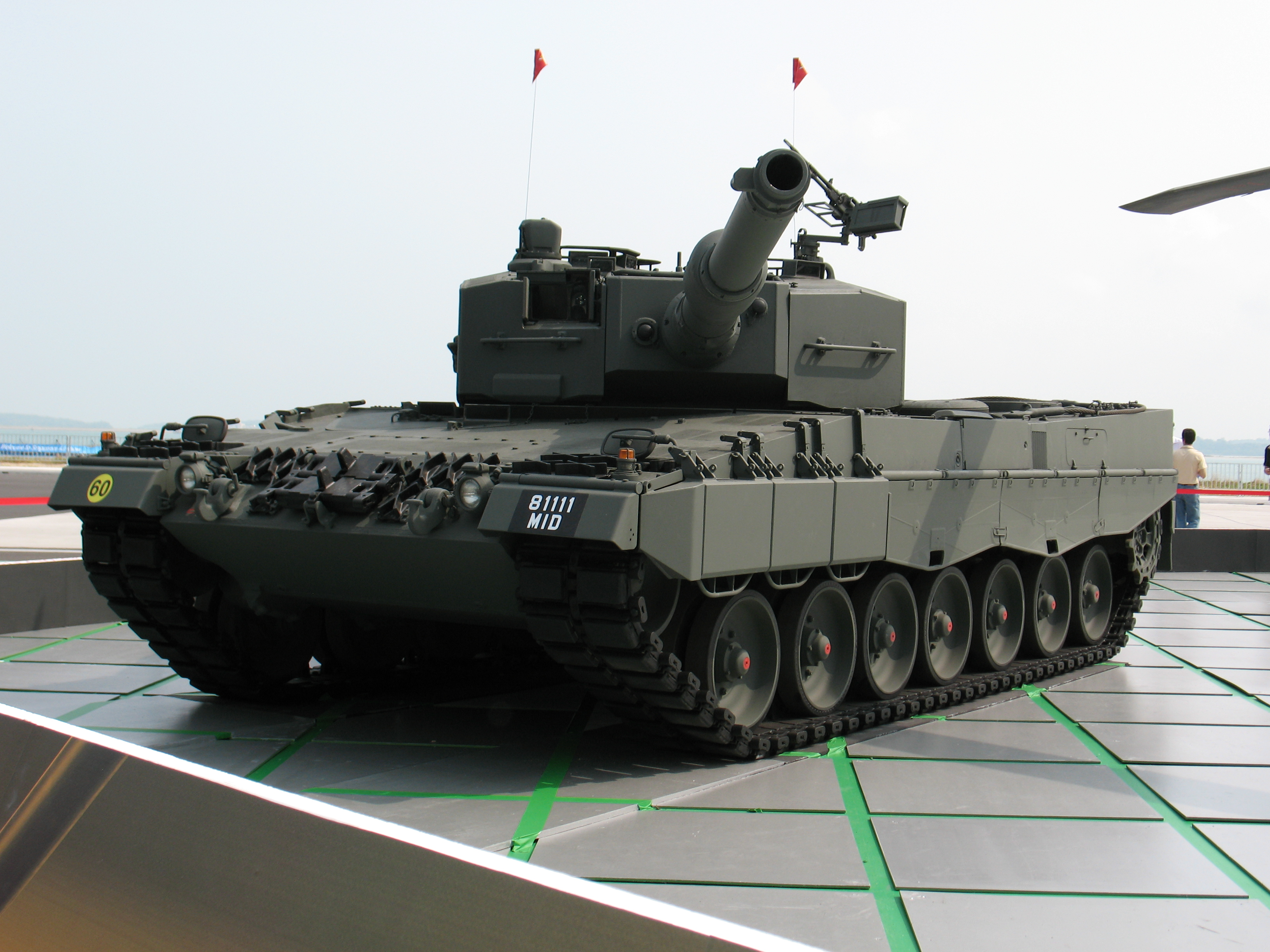
Singapore Army's Leopard 2A4 at the Singapore Airshow 2008.

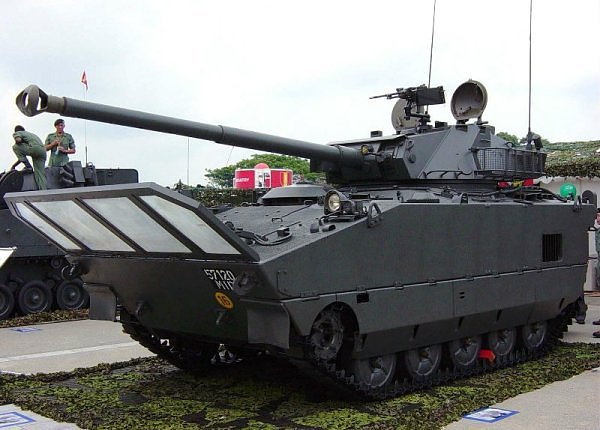
AMX-10PAC 90 with the 90mm main gun

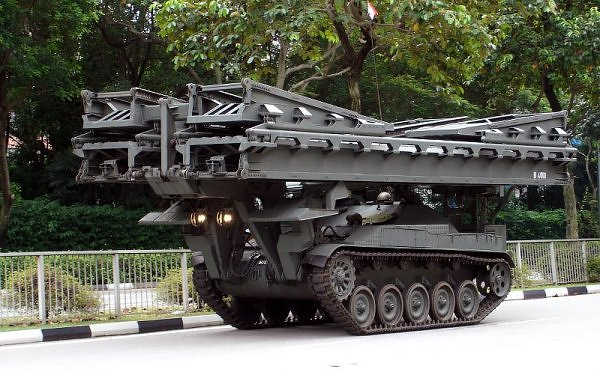
SM-1 Launched Bridge (SLB)

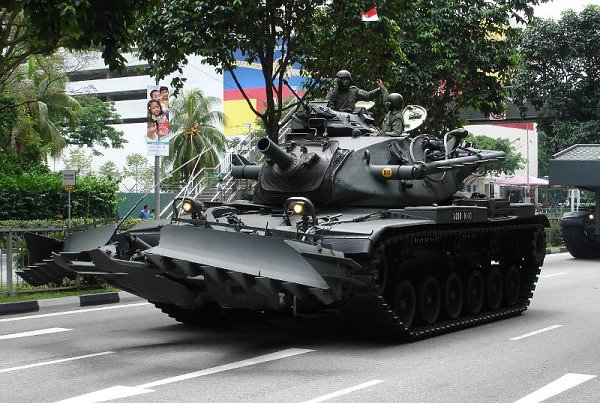
M728 Combat Engineer Vehicle (CEV)

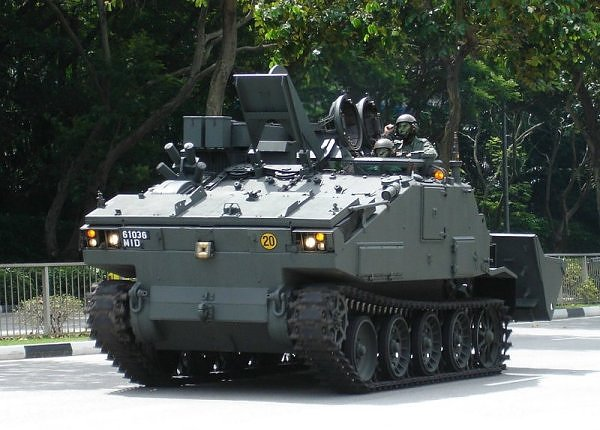
FV180 Combat Engineer Tractor (CET)

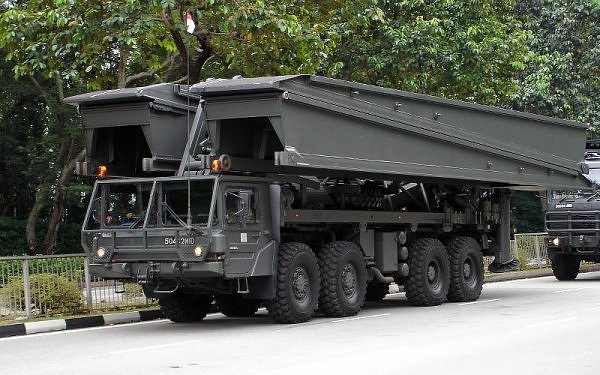
The Vehicle Launched Bridge

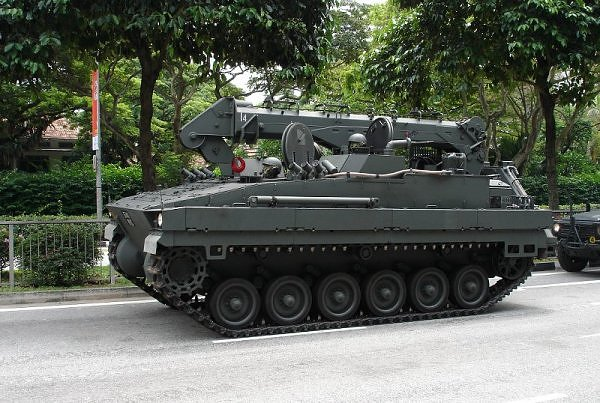
The Bionix Armoured Recovery Vehicle (ARV)

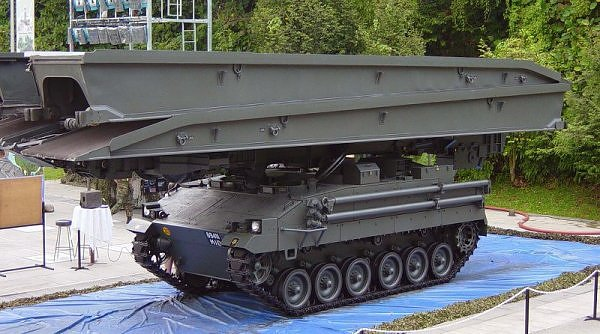
The Bionix Launched Bridge (BLB)

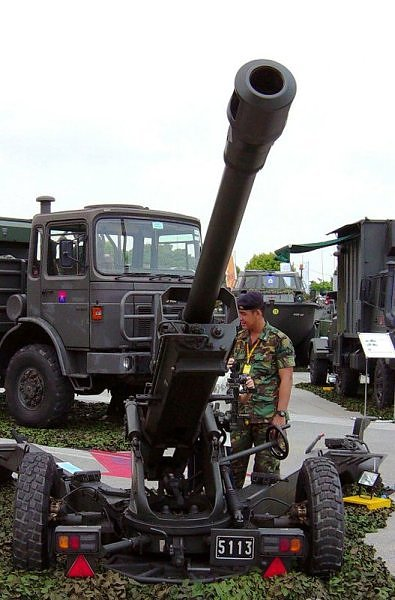
The 105mm Giat LG-1 Howitzer at the SAF Open House

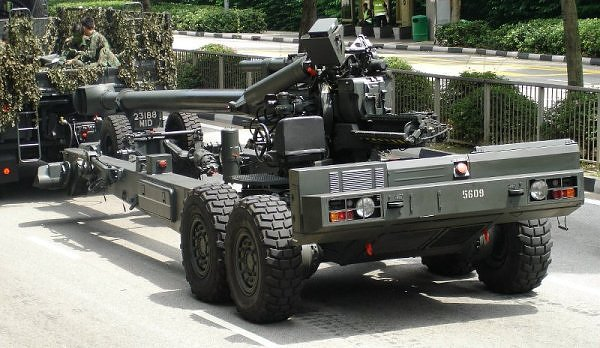
FH-2000 in towing configuration

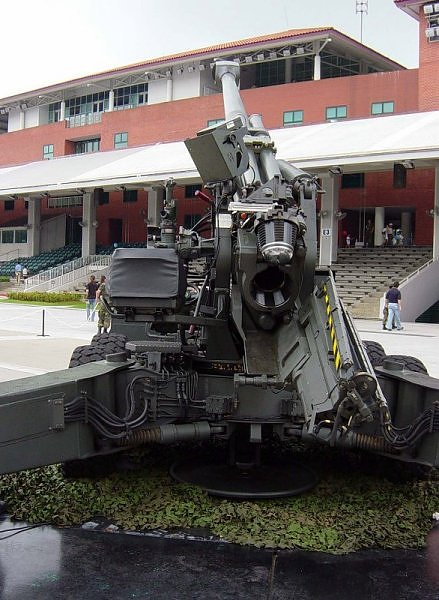
Open breech of FH-2000 as seen from loader position

The SLWH Pegasus at the Singapore Airshow 2008

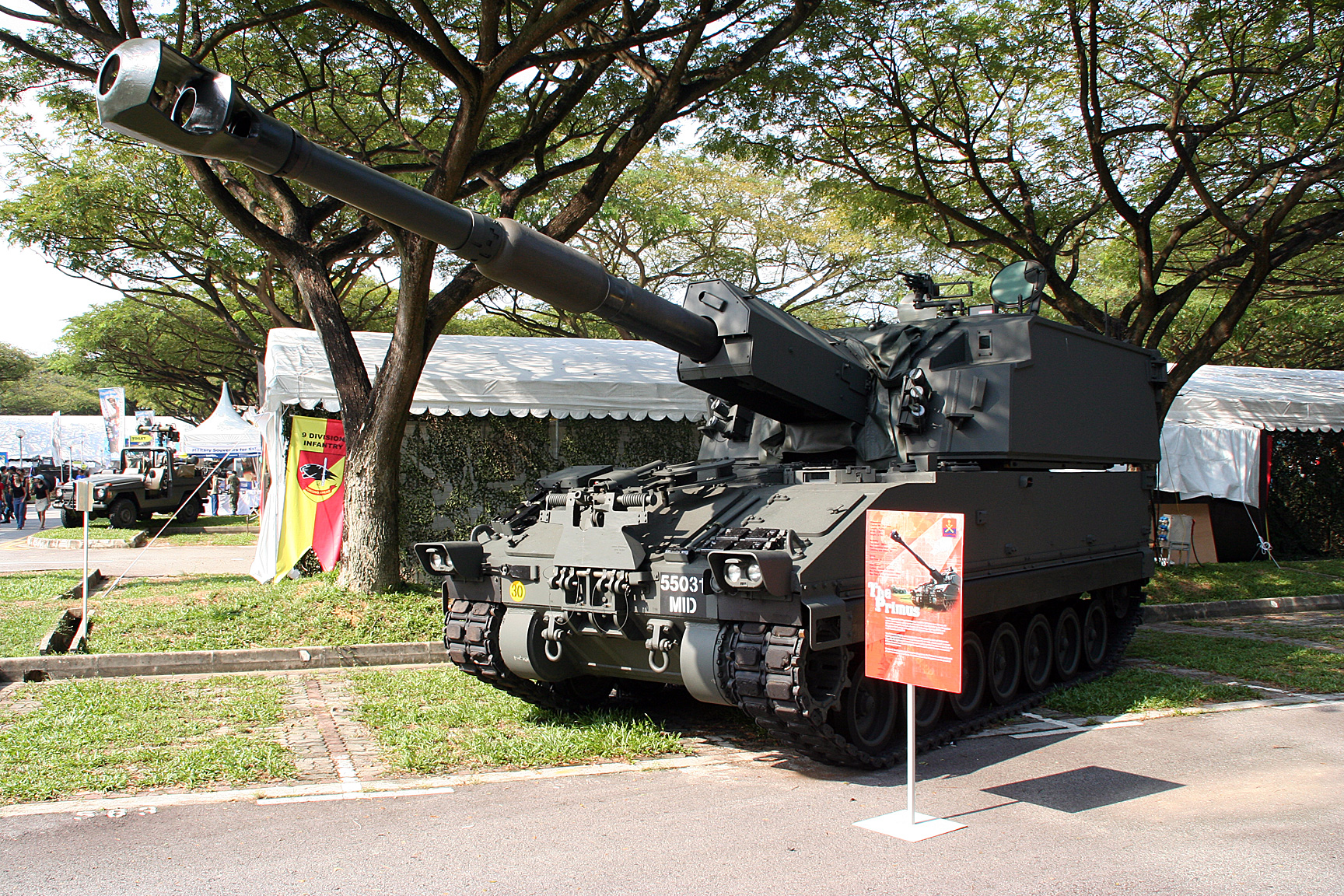
The 155mm/39calibre Singapore Self-Propelled Howitzer 1 (SSPH 1)

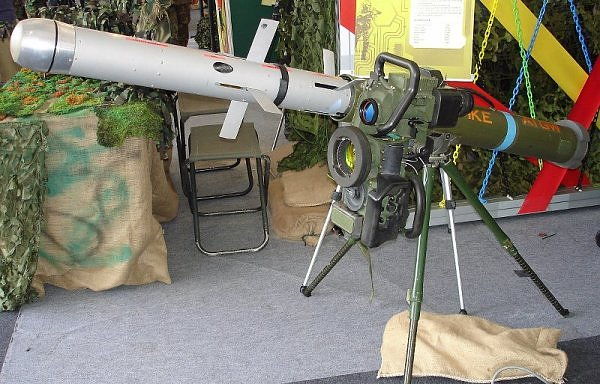
SPIKE ATGM complete with mock-up missile

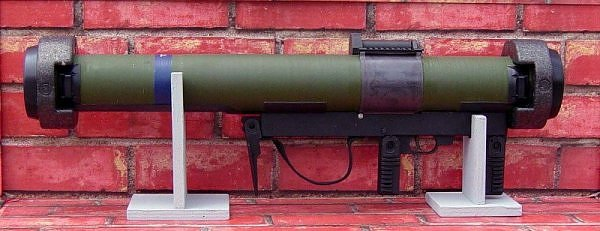
The MATADOR (Man-portable Anti-Tank, Anti-DOoR)

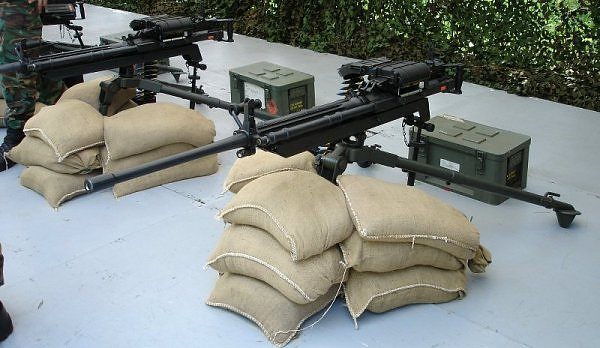
The new CIS-50 12.7mm Heavy Machine Gun

== See also ==
- Singapore Armed Forces
- Republic of Singapore Air Force
- Republic of Singapore Navy
- Singapore Special Operations Force
- Singapore Armed Forces ranks
