= Ravinder Singh (general) =

Singaporean army general

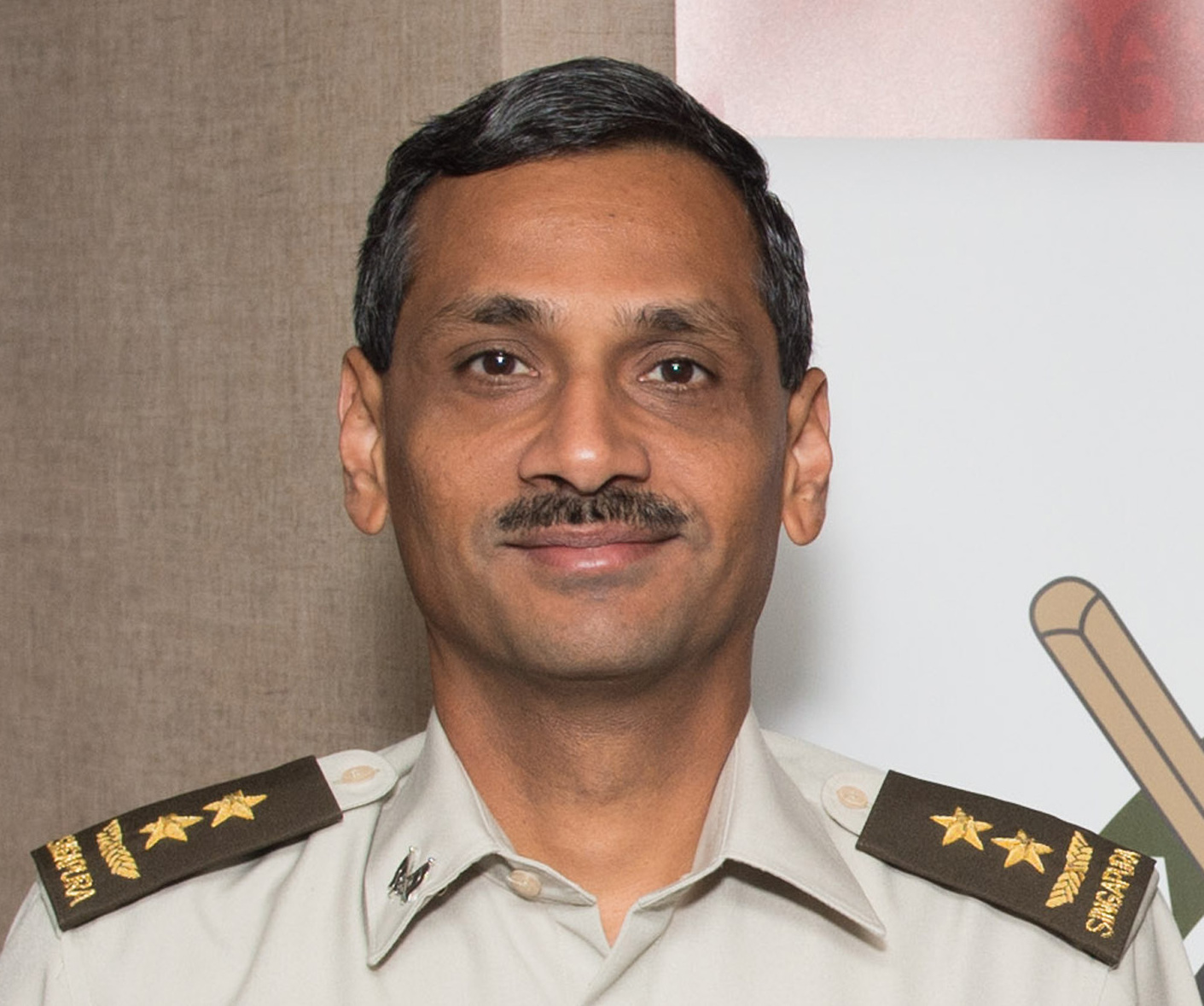
- Singh in 2013
- Born: Ravinder Singh s/o Harchand Singh; 1964 (age 61–62); Singapore
- Education: University of Oxford (BA, MA); Massachusetts Institute of Technology (MScM)
- Spouse: Kohila
- Military career
- Allegiance: Singapore
- Branch: Singapore Army
- Service years: 1982–2009, 2011–2014
- Rank: Major-General
- Commands: Chief of Army (2011–2014); Chief of Staff, Joint Staff; Commander, 6th Division; Commander, 2nd Singapore Infantry Brigade; Head, System Development Group; Commanding Officer, 3rd Signals Battalion

Ravinder Singh s/o Harchand Singh PPA(E) PPA(P), commonly known simply as Ravinder Singh, is a Singaporean former major-general and corporate executive. He served as the Chief of Army from 2011 to 2014.

Enlisting in the Singapore Armed Forces in 1982, Singh held several senior command and staff appointments, including Commander of the 6th Division and Chief of Staff of the Joint Staff, before retiring from active military service in 2009 to serve as Deputy Secretary (Technology) at the Ministry of Defence. He returned to active duty in 2011 to succeed Chan Chun Sing as Chief of Army, serving until his second retirement from the military in 2014.

Following his military career, Singh joined ST Engineering, where he held senior leadership roles in its land systems, electronics, and defence businesses before serving as chief operating officer from 2021. He has also sat on the boards of several statutory boards and research organisations, including the Agency for Science, Technology and Research and DSO National Laboratories.

== Early life and education ==
Born in Singapore, Singh received the Singapore Armed Forces Overseas Training Award (Academic) in 1983. He obtained a Bachelor of Arts (First Class Honours) and a Master of Arts in engineering science from the University of Oxford in 1986 and 1992 respectively. He was awarded the Singapore Armed Forces Postgraduate Scholarship in 1995. He graduated from the Massachusetts Institute of Technology in 1996 with a Master of Science in management. He attended the Advanced Management programme in Wharton Business School.

== Military career ==
Singh enlisted in the Singapore Armed Forces (SAF) in December 1982. He was commissioned as a signals officer in December 1986 and served in active duty with the United Nations Iraq–Kuwait Observation Mission (UNIKOM) in Kuwait in 1991. In 1995, he attended the United States Army Command and General Staff College at Fort Leavenworth. Throughout his military career, he has held various other appointments, including: Head, System Development Group; Commander, 2nd Singapore Infantry Brigade; Commander, 6th Division. In 2009, he retired from active military service as Chief of Staff, Joint Staff and transited to a civil servant as Deputy Secretary (Technology), Ministry of Defence.

In 2011, Singh was recalled to active service and succeeded Chan Chun Sing as the Chief of Army on 25 March 2011 and held this appointment until 21 March 2014, when he was succeeded by Perry Lim. Singh, who is of Sikh descent, was the first non-Chinese Singaporean to serve as the Chief of Army since 1982.

== Post-military career ==
Singh served as the president of ST Kinetics before his current appointment as the chief operating officer of ST Engineering, since 1 January 2021.

== Personal life ==
Singh is married to Kohila and they have two sons.

== Awards and decorations ==
- Public Administration Medal, (Gold) (Military) - PPA(E), in 2012.
- Public Administration Medal, (Silver) (Military) - PPA(P), in 2005.
- Long Service Medal (Military), in 2008.
- Singapore Armed Forces Long Service and Good Conduct (10 Years) Medal with 15 year clasp
- Singapore Armed Forces Good Service Medal
- Singapore Armed Forces Overseas Service Medal, in 1992
- United Nations Medal, in 1992.
- Knight Grand Cross of the Most Noble Order of the Crown of Thailand (2013)

Military offices
| Preceded by Major-General Chan Chun Sing | Chief of the Singapore Army; 25 March 2011–21 March 2014 | Succeeded by Major-General Perry Lim |
