= Perry Lim =

Singaporean army general

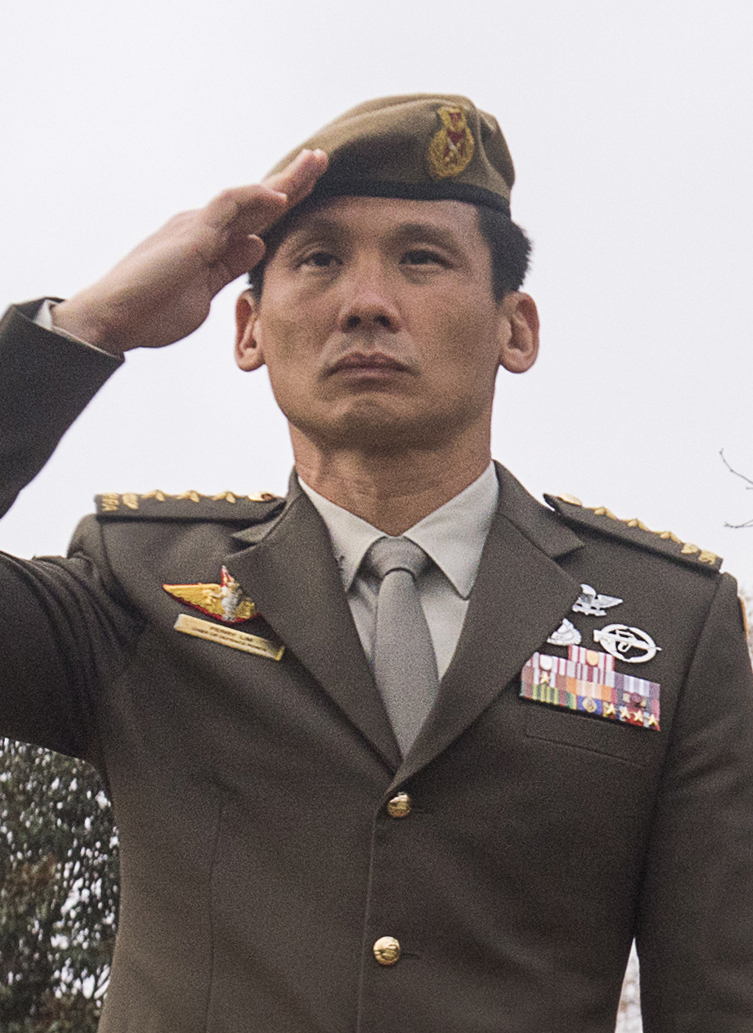
- Lim in 2017
- Born: 1972 (age 53–54); Singapore
- Alma mater: Christ's College, Cambridge; INSEAD; US Army Command and General Staff College
- Military career
- Allegiance: Singapore
- Branch: Singapore Army
- Service years: 1990–2006, 2008–2018
- Rank: Lieutenant-General
- Commands: Chief of Defence Force; Chief of Army; Chief of Staff – General Staff; Commander, 3rd Division; Commander, 7th Singapore Infantry Brigade; Commanding Officer, 1st Battalion Singapore Guards; Deputy Assistant Chief of the General Staff for Operations; Branch Head, Defence Policy Office; Head, Joint Plans and Transformation Department

Perry Lim Cheng Yeow
- Simplified Chinese: 林清耀
Transcriptions
Standard Mandarin
- Hanyu Pinyin: Lín Qīngyào

Perry Lim Cheng Yeow PJG PPA(E) PPA(P) is a Singaporean former lieutenant-general who served as Chief of Defence Force between 2015 and 2018.

== Education ==
Lim studied at Raffles Institution and won the President's Scholarship and the Singapore Armed Forces Overseas Scholarship in 1991. He studied at Christ's College, Cambridge, where he received a starred first in mechanical engineering. In 2008, he won the Lee Kuan Yew Postgraduate Scholarship and went on to study for a Master of Business Administration at INSEAD's Singapore campus.

== Military career ==
Lim enlisted in the SAF in December 1990 and was commissioned as a Guards officer in August 1991. He served as the Commanding Officer (CO) of the 1st Battalion Singapore Guards from 2003–2005, the Commander of the 7th Singapore Infantry Brigade in 2009, the Commander of the 3rd Division from 2011–2013, and the Chief of Staff (General Staff) from 2013–2014. Before he became the Chief of Staff (General Staff), he held the following appointments in the Ministry of Defence (MINDEF): Head, Joint Plans and Transformation; Branch Head, Defence Policy Office, Joint Operations Department; Deputy Assistant Chief of the General Staff (Operations). He was also the chairman of the executive committee of Singapore's National Day Parade in 2013.

Lim completed the Combined Arms Tactics Course conducted by the British Army in Warminster in 1998. He also attended the United States Army Command and General Staff College in Fort Leavenworth between 2001 and 2002. He was promoted to the rank of Brigadier-General on 1 July 2011.

Lim succeeded Ravinder Singh as the Chief of Army on 21 March 2014. He was succeeded by Melvyn Ong as the Chief of Army on 14 August 2015 and replaced Ng Chee Meng as the Chief of Defence Force (CDF) on 18 August 2015.

Lim was promoted to the rank of Lieutenant General on 1 July 2016.

== Non-military career ==
In addition to his military appointments, Lim was also a member of the Singapore Administrative Service.

From 2006 to 2008, he briefly retired from active military service and served as the Director of Higher Education in the Ministry of Education, where he was in charge of policies, planning and funding for tertiary and technical education, and regulating private education.

Lim joined resource manufacturer Royal Golden Eagle as a managing director in January 2019.

== Personal life ==
Lim is married with three children.

== Awards and decorations ==
- Meritorious Service Medal (Military) - PJG
- Public Administration Medal, (Gold) (Military) - PPA(E)
- Public Administration Medal, (Silver) (Military) - PPA(P)
- Long Service Medal (Military)
- Singapore Armed Forces Long Service and Good Conduct (20 Years) Medal
- Singapore Armed Forces Long Service and Good Conduct (10 Years) Medal with 15 year clasp
- Singapore Armed Forces Good Service Medal
- The Most Exalted Order of Paduka Keberanian Laila Terbilang (1st Class)
- Grand Meritorious Military Order Star (1 Class), Indonesia
- Army Meritorius Service Star (1 Class), Indonesia
- Knight Grand Cross of the Most Noble Order of the Crown, Thailand
- Darjah Panglima Gagah Angkatan Tentera ( Honorary Malaysian Armed Forces Order for Valour (First Degree) )
- US Legion Of Merit (Commander)
- Honorary Officer of the Order of Australia, Australia

Military offices
Preceded by Lieutenant-General Ng Chee Meng	9th Chief of Defence Force; 18 August 2015 – 23 March 2018	Succeeded by Major-General Melvyn Ong
Preceded by Major-General Ravinder Singh	Chief of the Singapore Army; 21 March 2014 – 14 August 2015	Succeeded by Brigadier-General Melvyn Ong
