= 6th Singapore Division =

6th Singapore Division/HQ Sense & Strike
- Logo of 6th Singapore Division
- Active: 1 October 1976 – present
- Country: Singapore
- Branch: Singapore Army
- Type: Combined arms
- Part of: Singapore Armed Forces
- Garrison/HQ: Mandai Hill Camp
- Mottos: "Swift and Deadly"
- Website: Official website

Commanders
- Commander, 6th Division: COL Kwek Kian Leong

The 6th Singapore Division (6 DIV) is a combined arms division of the Singapore Army.

== History ==
The 6th Division was formed on 1 October 1976 as a reserve division to manage and train reservist units. In November 1976, HQ 6th Singapore Infantry Brigade, was formed under the 6th Division's command.

In November 1992, the 6th Division became a combined arms division as part of the reorganisation within the Singapore Armed Forces (SAF), having at least one Infantry brigade and one Armour brigade, among others. In the 2000s, the HQ 6th Division relocated to Mandai Hill Camp. In November 2020, HQ Army Intelligence and HQ Artillery came under the command of the 6th Division.

== Organisation ==
The 6th Singapore Division has the following organization:

6th Singapore Division / Headquarters Sense and Strike (6 Div/HQ SS):

- Headquarters Singapore Artillery (HQ SA)
- Headquarters Army Intelligence (HQ AI)
- 9th Singapore Infantry Brigade (9 SIB)
- 76th Singapore Infantry Brigade (76 SIB)
- 6th Division Artillery (6 Div Arty)
- 6th Division Support Command (6 DISCOM)
- 6th Signal Battalion (6 Sig Bn)
- 6th Division Engineers
- 6th Divisional Air Defence Artillery Battalion (6 DA Bn)
