= Armour (Singapore Army) =

- Logo of the Armour Formation
- Active: November 1968 – present
- Country: Singapore
- Branch: Singapore Army
- Type: Armour
- Role: Heavy armour Armoured infantry
- Size: 4 active battalions
- Part of: Singapore Armed Forces
- Garrison/HQ: Keat Hong Camp; Sungei Gedong Camp
- Mottos: "Swift and Decisive"
- Colors: Black
- Equipment: Leopard 2SG; Bionix IFV; Hunter AFV; Bronco ATTC; M113 Ultra IFV
- Website: Official website

Commanders
- Chief Armour Officer: BG Lim Han Yong
- Formation Sergeant Major: SWO Eric Yap

Armour is the formation of the Singapore Army responsible for armoured warfare. It provides mobile firepower support and rapid mobility for the Army by helping to spearhead an advance past the enemy defences and seizing and holding key objectives on the battlefield. It has four active battalions—the 40th, 41st, 42nd and 48th Battalions, Singapore Armoured Regiment (SAR)—based in Keat Hong Camp and Sungei Gedong Camp, as well as an undisclosed number of reservist battalions.

Armour acts as an active deterrent towards any possible aggressors as it is known to act swiftly, being able to be deployed at a moment of notice to dominate the battlefield, hence its motto "Swift and Decisive".

== History ==
The Singapore Army's first armour unit, the 41st Singapore Armoured Battalion (41 SAB), was created in Keat Hong Camp in November 1968. In 1969, the Army purchased V-200 Commando vehicles and AMX-13 tanks, and equipped a newly formed armour unit, the 40th Battalion (40 SAB), with the AMX-13 tanks, while the V-200 Commando vehicles were shared between 41 SAB and 40 SAB. 40 SAB and 41 SAB had their first mono-intakes in March and July 1970 respectively.

On 9 August 1969, 18 AMX-13 tanks from 40 SAB were showcased in a drive-past along St Andrew's Road during the National Day Parade. The Army has since organised armour column drive-pasts during the National Day Parades in the Padang (until 1974, 1978, 1982, 1984, 1987, 1990, 1995, 2000, 2005, 2010, 2019-20, 2023-25) and as part of the armored element of the Dynamic Defence Display at NS Square. In 1987, the AMX-13 was upgraded to the AMX-13SM1, which had a diesel engine and upgraded track and suspension systems.

In July 1970, following the creation of the 4th Singapore Armoured Brigade (4 SAB), 41 SAB and 40 SAR were renamed 41 SAR and 40 SAR respectively. 42 SAR was formed on 1 October 1971 at Selarang Camp when one armoured infantry company from 41 SAR was transferred over to form 42 SAR's first company. In June 1972, 41 SAR took in another company from 41 SAR. 46 SAR was subsequently created in 1976. The School of Armour and Reserve Armour Training Centre (later renamed Armour Training Centre) were formed later.

In 1973, the Army acquired M113A1 armoured personnel carriers to replace the V-200 Commando, and further upgraded the M113A1 to the M113A2 Ultra IFV in 1993. The Army also subsequently acquired the Bv 206 combat service support tracked vehicle. In July 1999, the Army started using the locally designed and produced Bionix infantry fighting vehicles. In 2004, the Army introduced the Bronco All Terrain Tracked Carrier to enhance combat service support functions in Armour.

On 6 September 1977, 40 SAR, 41 SAR and 42 SAR received their regimental colours from President Benjamin Henry Sheares at Selarang Camp. On 29 October 1991, 46 SAR received its regimental colours from President Wee Kim Wee. In 2009, 48 SAR was inaugurated and received its new regimental colours from President Tony Tan on 1 July 2013 during the Singapore Armed Forces Day Parade.

In 2006, 42 SAR became the first Armour battalion to use the battlefield management system in its armoured vehicles.

In December 2008, the Army phased out the AMX-13SM1 and replaced it with the newly acquired Leopard 2A4 main battle tank, which was then further upgraded to the Leopard 2SG model.

== Organisation ==
The Armour formation has four active battalions. Three – 40 SAR, 41 SAR and 42 SAR – are armoured infantry battalions, while the fourth, 48 SAR, is a tank battalion. In addition, there are a number of reservist armour battalions distinguishable from the active battalions by their three-digit numbering (e.g. 442 SAR). These battalions are organised under HQ Armour or into one of four armoured brigades - 4 SAB, 8 SAB, 54 SAB and 56 SAB - three of which are assigned to each of the Singapore Army's combined arms divisions.

An armoured infantry battalion is typically made up of five companies: one HQ company, three combat companies, and one support company. The HQ company comprises the various combat service support elements, while the combat companies have four platoons each. The support company contains the mortar, pioneer/engineer, ATGM and reconnaissance elements.

List of Armour Brigades
Name	Division	Motto	Headquarters
4th Singapore Armoured Brigade (4 SAB)	HQ Armour	Terror on Tracks	Sungei Gedong Camp
8th Singapore Armoured Brigade (8 SAB)	3rd Division	Valiant Thrust	Keat Hong Camp
54th Singapore Armoured Brigade (54 SAB)	9th Division	We Spearhead	N.A.
56th Singapore Armoured Brigade (56 SAB)	HQ Armour	Bold and Decisive	N.A.

List of Armour Battalions
Name	Type Of Unit	Brigade	Motto	Base
40th Battalion, Singapore Armoured Regiment (40 SAR)	Armoured Infantry Battalion	8th Singapore Armoured Brigade	Victory Unto Victory	Keat Hong Camp
41st Battalion, Singapore Armoured Regiment (41 SAR)	Armoured Infantry Battalion	8th Singapore Armoured Brigade	Pressure Forward	Keat Hong Camp
42nd Battalion, Singapore Armoured Regiment (42 SAR)	Armoured Infantry Battalion	4th Singapore Armoured Brigade	The Cutting Edge	Sungei Gedong Camp
48th Battalion, Singapore Armoured Regiment (48 SAR)	Tank Battalion	4th Singapore Armoured Brigade	Rapid Dominance	Sungei Gedong Camp

== Training ==
The Armour Training Institute (ATI), located in Sungei Gedong Camp, trains and evaluates all active and reservist Armour battalions. It is subdivided into five training centres as follows: the School of Armour (SOA), the Armoured Battle Group Training Centre (ABGTC), the Armour Combat Training Centre (ACTC), the Main Battle Tank Training Centre (MBTTC), and the Active Unit Training Centre (AUTC).

The ATI maintains a combat armoured infantry company comprising three platoons to role-play as enemies (known as OPFOR) against active and reservist units during evaluations. They simulate an enemy force through the use of the Battlefield Instrumentation (BFI) system introduced in 2006.

=== Overseas exercises ===
The Singapore Armed Forces collaborate with the armed forces of other countries to conduct overseas training exercises for Armour units.

List of overseas exercises
Name	Location	Description	Reference
Exercise Wallaby	Shoalwater Bay Military Training Area, Queensland, Australia	An annual exercise in which Armour units engage in live firing drills with the Australian Army or receive evaluations on their performances.	
Exercise Matilda	Mount Bundey Training Area, Northern Territory, Australia	A non-reciprocal, company-level exercise involving 48 SAR and the Australian 1st Armoured Regiment to enhance tactical skills and inter-operability.	
Exercise Bold Kurukshetra	Babina, Uttar Pradesh, India	A joint exercise involving an armoured infantry combat company of the Singapore Army and armour units of the Indian Army.	
Exercise Panzer Strike	Bergen-Hohne Training Area, Lower Saxony, Germany	An exercise involving 48 SAR and the School of Armour honing their gunnery and driving skills by firing on the move and practising platoon movements. 48 SAR also conducts live-firing exercises with tank units of the German Army.	

== Equipment ==
Armour units use a wide range of vehicles for armoured combat and engineering missions. The vehicles include locally developed armoured platforms such as the Bionix IFV, Hunter AFV and Bronco ATTC, as well as imported foreign platforms upgraded and/or adapted to suit local conditions.

Vehicle	Image	Type	Quantity	Origin	Notes	Reference
Leopard 2SG		Main battle tank	224+	Germany	Upgraded with AMAP composite armour by ST Kinetics	
Hunter AFV	Hunter AFV of the Singapore Army	Infantry fighting vehicle	3	Singapore	Production and operational model revealed in June 2019	
Bionix II		Infantry fighting vehicle	300	Singapore	Variants include Bionix 40/50, Bionix 25	
M113A2 Ultra IFV / M113A2 Ultra OWS		Armoured personnel carrier	720	United States	Upgraded to the A2 model; also used by the Air Force for SHORAD	
Bronco All Terrain Tracked Carrier		Armoured articulated tracked vehicle	400	Singapore		
Bandvagn 206		Armoured articulated tracked vehicle	300	Sweden	The ones used by the Artillery were mounted with the ARTHUR radar; some retired units are used by the Singapore Civil Defence Force for jungle firefighting operations as a Tracked Firefighting Vehicle (TFV)	
Bergepanzer Büffel		Armoured recovery vehicle	20	Germany	Based on the Leopard 2A4 chassis	
Bionix Armoured Recovery Vehicle		Armoured recovery vehicle		Singapore		
