= Army engineering maintenance =

Army engineering maintenance consists of those engineers, technicians, and military organizations responsible for the expert repair and maintenance of army vehicles, weapon systems, and other equipment.

Army engineering maintenance should not be confused with military engineering which is distinctly separate and analogous to civil engineering while the former is analogous to mechanical engineering and electrical engineering.

== Operational and tactical level focus ==
At the operational and tactical levels, army engineering maintenance is focused on the repair and scheduled maintenance work required to keep army equipment fleets operational.

== Strategic level focus ==
At the strategic level, army engineering maintenance is closely linked to military logistics. At this level, it includes work such as the design, development, and testing of new vehicles and weapon systems. It also includes lifecycle management activities once new systems become operational.

The U.S. Army maintenance policy clarifies key components:

Maintenance engineering
application of engineering techniques, skills, and effort to ensure equipment can be maintained effectively throughout its lifecycle.
Maintenance operations
management and performance of services like repair, testing, overhaul, modification, and technical assistance.

== Army engineering in nations' armed forces ==
- Royal Australian Electrical and Mechanical Engineers – Australia
- Corps of Royal Canadian Electrical and Mechanical Engineers – Canada
- Royal New Zealand Army Logistic Regiment – New Zealand
- Pakistan Army Corps of Electrical and Mechanical Engineering – Pakistan
- Royal Electrical and Mechanical Engineers – United Kingdom
- Ordnance Corps – United States
- Maintenance and Engineering Support - Singapore

== See also ==
- Motor transport
- Armoured recovery vehicle
- Systems engineering
- Military engineering
