= Personnel Command (Singapore Armed Forces) =

Personnel Command (PERSCOM)
- Logo of Personnel Command
- Active: 2011 – present
- Country: Singapore
- Branch: Singapore Army
- Type: Human resources
- Part of: Singapore Armed Forces
- Garrison/HQ: Central Manpower Base
- Motto: "Excel to Serve"
- Website: Official website

Commanders
- Commander, Personnel Command: COL Alan Tan Yukun

Personnel Command (PERSCOM) is the executive command for the manpower operations of the Singapore Armed Forces (SAF) and shared services between the SAF and Ministry of Defence (MINDEF). In peacetime, PERSCOM performs human resources administrative functions for the SAF and MINDEF, including office administration, documentation and records keeping. In times of war, it provides manpower operational support.

== History ==
In 2006, the SAF formed a team to conceptualise a human resources services delivery model for the future. Two years later, a task force was established to analyse gaps in administration across domains. A project group, comprising human resources practitioners from all three branches of the SAF, was set up to address gaps in the human resources system and support the implementation of human resources transformation initiatives. In April 2006, PERSCOM was created to support the SAF's operational demands and ensure effective human resources policy implementation and service delivery.
