= Royal Australian Electrical and Mechanical Engineers =

Army administrative corps

- Founded: 1 December 1942
- Country: Australia
- Branch: Australian Army
- Type: Corps
- Role: Army engineering maintenance
- Mottos: Arte et marte (Latin, 'By skill and by fighting')
- Colors: Blue, yellow and red
- March: Lilliburlero/The Boys in the Backroom

Commanders
- Head of Corps: Brigadier Gabrielle Follett (since 2025)

The Royal Corps of Australian Electrical and Mechanical Engineers (RAEME; pronounced Raymee) is a corps of the Australian Army that has responsibility for the maintenance and recovery of all Army electrical and mechanical equipment. RAEME has members from both the Australian Regular Army and the Army Reserve.

The Australian Electrical and Mechanical Engineers (AEME) were raised on 1 December 1942. In 1948, the corp were granted the Royal prefix in recognition of their performance during World War II. On 1 December 2006, the last independent RAEME Workshop was disbanded. RAEME soldiers continue in their role to provide support through attachment to other units in Tech Support Troops, Sections or Platoons.

== Role ==
=== Craftsman ===
A RAEME soldier is known as a 'Craftsman'. RAEME Craftsmen repair and maintain equipment as diverse as tanks, trucks and armoured personnel carriers, helicopters, boats, radios, radars and computers, artillery guns and missile systems. Among the wide range of trades available in the Corps are vehicle, material, energy, electronics, weapons, aircraft, marine and recovery technicians.

=== Artificer ===
Artificer Sergeant Major (ASM) is an appointment held by a Warrant Officer Class 1 or 2 in RAEME (Depending on the size of the unit) whose function is the senior soldier/tradesmen for the repair and recovery of all mechanical and electrical equipment.

The role artificer is also used in the Australian Army in the Royal Corps of the Australian Electrical and Mechanical Engineers (RAEME) and applies to the senior soldier (tradesman) in the Combat Service Support Battalion (CSSB) or workshop Troop or Technical Support unit.

An ASM WO1 must have passed the Artificer training course and served as an Artificer Mechanical/Electrical or similar discipline as an Artificer Staff Sergeant and ASM Warrant Officer Class 2 prior to promotion to WO1.

=== Mission ===
The mission of the Royal Australian Electrical and Mechanical Engineers (RAEME) is to provide maintenance engineering, materiel maintenance, modification and recovery support to the Army, including aircraft and watercraft.

=== Engineering monitoring of equipment ===
RAEME Officers and Artificers are the asset managers of units and tasked to monitor the equipment condition, reliability and equipment capability. This provides intelligence to the Commander on the operational capability and endurance of his Force now, and for future planning, and, it enables available engineering capacity throughout the support chain to be best directed to conserve the Inventory.

=== Engineering practicalities ===
While established engineering principles and techniques remain the guiding light for engineering management, major adaptations have to be made in the Forward Areas especially during active operations.

Forward repair in the field under conditions of threat and constant preparedness to defend and fight, and with limited engineering facilities in the way of cover, hard standing, lift, services, pre-planning, test equipment, machine and power tools and repair parts immediately at hand, demands not only high levels of military and trade skill but also ingenuity and a certain attitude and foresight.

Routinely the field repair, recovery and engineering management techniques needed in an Operational Theatre have to be adapted in a way that is rarely used, or appropriate, in a base or training environment. Often the techniques used in previous conflicts need to be rediscovered.

== Customs and traditions ==
=== Motto ===
Following discussion with its sister Corps in the British Army, REME, approval was granted for RAEME to adopt the maxim ARTE et MARTE as their corps motto. The strict translation of the Latin, to English, is difficult, though the translation which has been officially adopted is "with skill and fighting". The corps motto is used as a call to express the guiding principle to unite the Corps and its elements, to achieve their individual or collective objectives for the task at hand.

=== March ===
The RAEME March (in quick time) is an arrangement of "Lilliburlero" and "The Boys in the Backroom".

=== Patron saint ===
Saint Eligius is recognised as the spiritual guide and mentor of RAEME personnel. Saint Eligius is universally known as a protector of tradesmen and craftsmen.

=== The Prince Philip Banner ===
On 5 March 1959, Prince Philip, Duke of Edinburgh, was appointed as the Colonel-in-Chief of the Royal Australian Electrical and Mechanical Engineers (RAEME). On 20 May 1986, he formally presented the Prince Philip Banner to the Corps during a ceremonial parade at the RAEME Training Centre in Bandiana.

== Order of precedence ==
Preceded by Royal Australian Army Ordnance Corps	Australian Army Order of Precedence	Succeeded by Royal Australian Army Educational Corps

== See also ==
- Australian Defence Force
- Royal Electrical and Mechanical Engineers (UK)
- Army engineering maintenance
