= Military history of Singapore =

Singapore has had a history of armed conflict and personnel dating to the colonial period.

== Colonial period ==
The Singapore Volunteer Rifle Corps, a private organisation, was formed after the 1854 Hokkien-Teochew riots that occurred between the respective Chinese secret societies from 5 to 17 May that year. The conflict caused widespread unrest and loss of life on the island, and was severe enough for the police to require the support of the military, some marines, special constables, sepoys and even convicts to restore order. More than 500 people were killed and 300 houses burned down. Its numbers eventually dwindled to a small half-company, and the corps was disbanded in December 1887.

In February 1888, the corps was revived as the Singapore Volunteer Artillery Corps (SVA). It was the first unit in the British Empire, regular or auxiliary, to field the Maxim Gun. The guns arrived in 1889 and were funded by donations from the Sultan of Johor, members of the various communities in Singapore and prominent businessmen.

In 1901, the SVA was renamed the Singapore Volunteer Corps (SVC), due to its diverse sub-units. It comprised artillery, infantry, engineers and rifle sections. During World War I, the SVC helped to quell the Sepoy Mutiny of 1915, which resulted in the deaths of 11 volunteers. The first infantry unit was formed at Raffles Institution by volunteers on 15 May 1901.

In 1922, the SVC was amalgamated with the Penang and Province Wellesley Volunteer Corps, Malacca Volunteer Corps, and Labuan Volunteer Defence Detachment to form the Straits Settlements Volunteer Force (SSVF). In 1928, the SSVF infantry was re-organised into 4 battalions. The 1st and 2nd battalions consisted of members of the Singapore Volunteer Corps (1,250 men). Besides the infantry, the rest of the SSVF consisted of the Singapore Royal Artillery (SRA), Singapore Royal Engineers, Singapore Armoured Car Company and 3 ambulance units.

== World War II ==
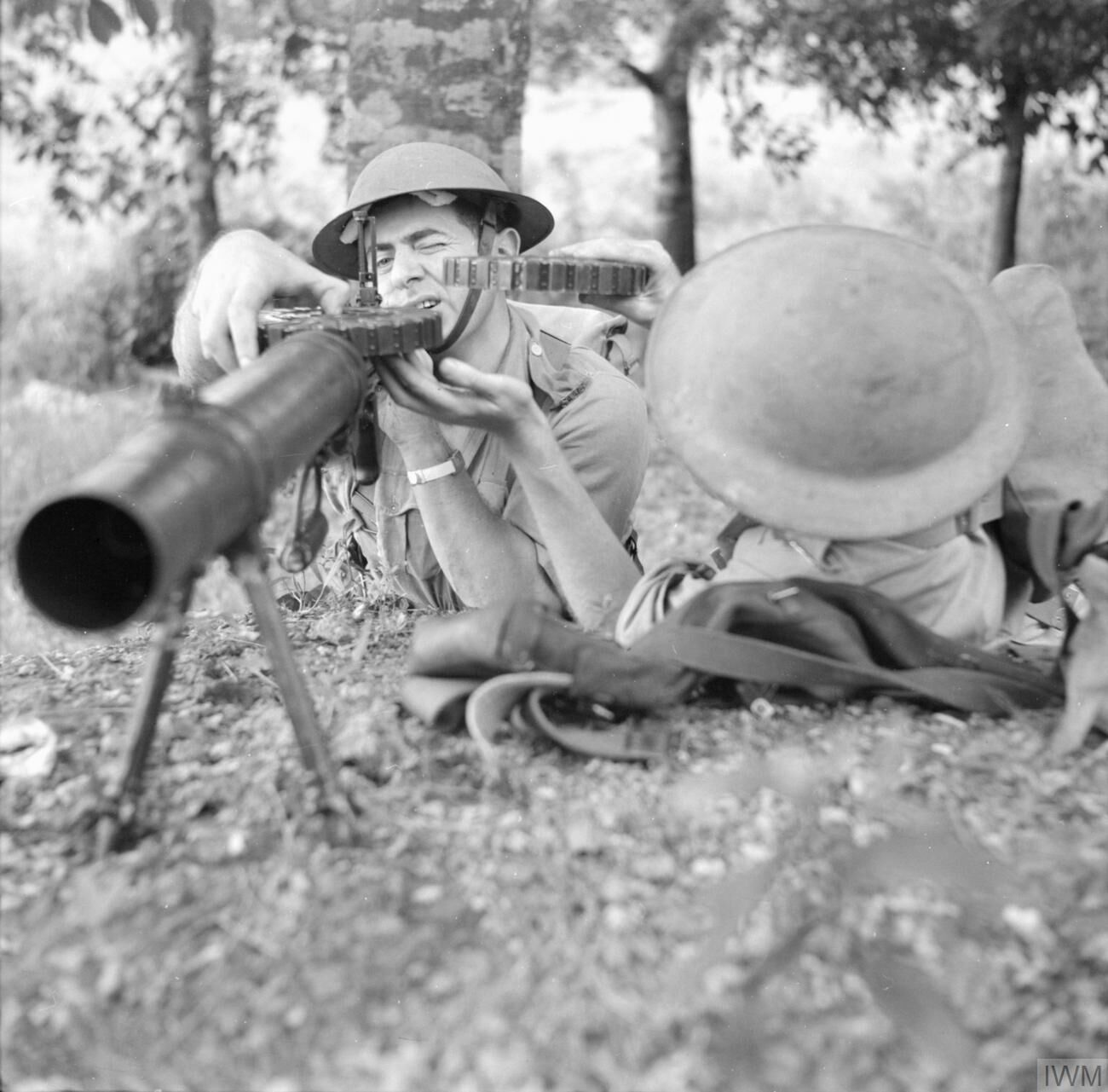
Volunteer troops training with a Lewis machine gun, November 1941

The Corps was involved in the defence of Singapore during the Second World War. As international tensions heightened during the 1930s, an increasing number of men of the various immigrant nationalities and local born ethnicities in the Settlements — predominantly European, Malay, Chinese, Indian and Eurasian — joined the SSVF. It included naval, air force, special operations, irregular units, and home guard units.

On 25 December 1941, Lieutenant Colonel John Dalley created Dalforce, also known as the Singapore Overseas Chinese Anti-Japanese Volunteer Army as an irregular forces/guerrilla unit within the SSVF during World War II. Its members were recruited among the local ethnic Chinese people of Singapore, and their ferocious fighting earned them the nickname Dalley's Desperadoes. By the time the Japanese invaded, Dalforce numbered 4,000 resistance fighters.

The SSVF — including four infantry battalions — took part in the Battle of Singapore in 1942, and most of its members were captured on 15 February 1942 when their positions were overrun.

=== Notable battles ===
- Battle of Bukit Timah
- Battle of Kranji
- Battle of Sarimbun Beach
- Battle of China
- Japanese Occupation of Singapore

== Post-World War II ==
The end of the Japanese occupation saw the SVC being revived in 1949.

In 1954, the SSVF was disbanded and the Singapore Volunteer Force (formerly the SVC) was absorbed into the Singapore Military Forces (SMF). The SVF assisted in defence during the Malayan Emergency.

== Indonesian confrontation ==
From 1963 to 1966, Indonesia carried out a policy of confrontation, also known as Konfrontasi, as it opposed to the formation of Malaysia and the existence of the Federation of Malaya, Sabah, Sarawak, and Singapore. The conflict was an intermittent war marked by armed incursions, bomb attacks, and acts of subversion and destabilisation and also included numerous raids by Indonesian volunteers on targets within the Federation of Malaysia, which at that time included Singapore. The Philippines were aligned with Indonesia due to its claim for Sabah. It broke off diplomatic relations with Malaysia, but did not participate in the hostilities.

One of the raids the MacDonald House bombing on 10 March 1965 by two Indonesian saboteurs. Two people were killed and thirty three were injured. The saboteurs were caught, and they turned out to be from the Korps Marinir. They were subsequently tried and executed, despite great pressure from Indonesia. In later years, the executions remained a source of unhappiness in Singapore-Indonesian relations. Lee Kuan Yew later sprinkled flowers on the graves of the Marines, helping heal the rift between the two countries.

During the confrontation, the First and Second Battalions, Singapore Infantry Regiment (1 SIR and 2 SIR) were placed under Malaysian command and deployed in various parts of Malaya to fight the saboteurs. Local defence was the responsibility of the Singapore Volunteer Corps and the Vigilante Corps.

On Feb 28, 1965, one platoon from the 2 SIR were caught in an ambush at Kota Tinggi. 8 soldiers were killed immediately while a 9th was taken prisoner and later executed. A reprisal mission led by then 2LT Daljeet Singh resulted in 7 Indonesian guerillas killed and several more captured.

Hostilities ended with the overthrow of President Sukarno in October 1965.

== Post-independence ==
Upon independence, Singapore's military consisted of two infantry battalions, and the majority of these soldiers were Malaysians. Singapore's independence on 9 August 1965 strained ties with its two immediate neighbors, Malaysia and Indonesia made defense a high priority. Then-PM Lee Kuan Yew appointed Goh Keng Swee to head the new Ministry of Interior and Defence. In 1966, drawing from the Israeli model, National Service was determined the best way to provide for a deterrent to potential aggressors. A Brigadier T. J.D. Campbell was appointed as the first Director of the General Staff.

The first cohorts of officers and non-commissioned officers (now Specialists), taught by Israeli instructors, graduated from Singapore Armed Forces Training Institute (SAFTI) in 1967. With this new cadre of leaders, army was expanded from the existing two infantry battalions to two brigades between 1967 and 1970. Efforts were made to ensure unit integrity by keeping the officers, NCOs, and men of reservist battalions together.

The Air Defence Command (now Republic of Singapore Air Force) was formed with the help of Royal Air Force in 1968. The first class of pilots receiving basic military training and general flying instructions in the new Flying Training School at Tengah Air Base, and fighter training in the UK.

The Maritime Command (now Republic of Singapore Navy) was based at Sentosa temporarily until permanent facilities at the now-defunct Brani Naval Base were ready. Two gunboats were built by the British and Germans in 1969; subsequent models were built locally, entering service in 1970. The ex-USS Thrasher and USS Whippoorwill (commissioned RSS Jupiter and RSS Mercury) minesweepers and County-class tank landing ships were purchased from the United States subsequently.

== Start of the defense industry ==
In 1967, the Sheng-Li Holding Company (Simplified Chinese: 胜利; pinyin: sheng li; translated: victory) was established under the Ministry of Defence to promote the local defence industry. By the 1970s, Singapore was producing small arms (the M-16) through Chartered Industries of Singapore (CIS) and small arms, mortar, and artillery ammunition through Chartered Ammunition Industries for local use and export. Sheng-Li Holdings was later restructured into Singapore Technologies (now ST Engineering) in 1989, the parent of ST Kinetics. ST Kinetics produces the indigenous SAR-21 and Bionix AFV today. Others, either locally designed or locally owned designs, such as the Ultimax 100, SAR-80, SR-88, FH-88, and FH-2000 were also produced.

== Peacetime emergency ==
- 1974 : Attack on oil refinery and hijacking of ferry boat Laju
- 1983 : Singapore cable car crash
- 1986 : Collapse of Hotel New World
- 1991 : Midair plane hijacking of Singapore Airlines Flight 117
- 2013 : Riot at Little India

== Humanitarian aid ==
- 1999 : Medical support during the Jiji earthquake in Taiwan
- 2004 Indian Ocean earthquake and tsunami
- 2005 :
  - Logistic support for Hurricane Katrina
  - 2004 Indian Ocean earthquake
  - 2005 Nias–Simeulue earthquake
- 2006 : Yogyakarta earthquake

== Peacekeeping missions ==
The Singapore Armed Forces are involved in various UN peacekeeping missions:

- UNTAG (UN Transitional Authority Group) Namibia - ‘89,
- UNIKOM (UN Iraq-Kuwait Observer Mission) Kuwait - ‘91
- UNTAC (UN Transitional Authority in Cambodia) Cambodia - ‘93,
- UNOSMA (UN Observer Mission to South Africa) South Africa - ’94,
- UNSMA (UN Special Mission in Afghanistan) Afghanistan - ’97
- INTERFET (International Force in East Timor) East Timor - ’99
- UNTAET (UN Transition Authority in East Timor) East Timor - ’00
- UNMEE (UN Mission in Ethiopia and Eritrea) Ethiopia - ’02
- UNMISET (UN Mission of Support in East Timor) Timor-Leste - ‘02

=== Iraq ===
In 2003, Singapore deployed a C-130 transport aircraft, a landing ship tank and 31 personnel on a two month mission to assist in airlift, transportation and supply in rebuilding Iraq.

In 2017, Defence Minister Ng Eng Hen, Senior Minister of State for Defence Dr Mohamad Maliki Bin Osman, Chief of Defence Force Lieutenant-General (LG) Perry Lim, Deputy Secretary (Policy) Keith Tan, and senior SAF officers paid a visit to SAF medical teams stationed in Iraq.

In 2018, Defence minister Ng Eng Hen announced that more personnel from SAF and SPF will be sent for counter-terrorism training in Iraq.

=== East Timor ===
- United Nations Mission in East Timor (1999)

From May 2001 to November 2002, the SAF joined a UN-endorsed coalition force to help with peacekeeping activities in East Timor. Commandos were deployed as part of the UN Peacekeeping contingent, providing security for the villagers to ensure that militia groups were unable to infiltrate. This was the first time SAF deployed combat peacekeepers bearing arms. This was called Operation Blue Heron, which ended in 2003 with all SAF personnel returned.

== Operation Blue Ridge ==
The SAF undertook a six-year deployment, Operation Blue Ridge, in Afghanistan during 2007-2013. During the operation, the SAF deployed, amongst others, Construction Engineering, Medical and Dental, and Weapon Locating Radar Teams, as well as UAV Task Groups to support the International Security Assistance Force (ISAF) in their mission to train Afghan National Security Forces and assist Afghanistan in rebuilding key government institutions.

== International military intervention against the Islamic State ==
Since 2014, the SAF has deployed Medical Teams, Counter Terrorism Training Units, Imagery Analysis Teams, Operations and Intelligence Planners and the Republic of Singapore Air Force (RSAF) KC-135R tanker aircraft, in support of the multinational coalition to defeat ISIS.
