= Goh Si Hou =

Singaporean military officer

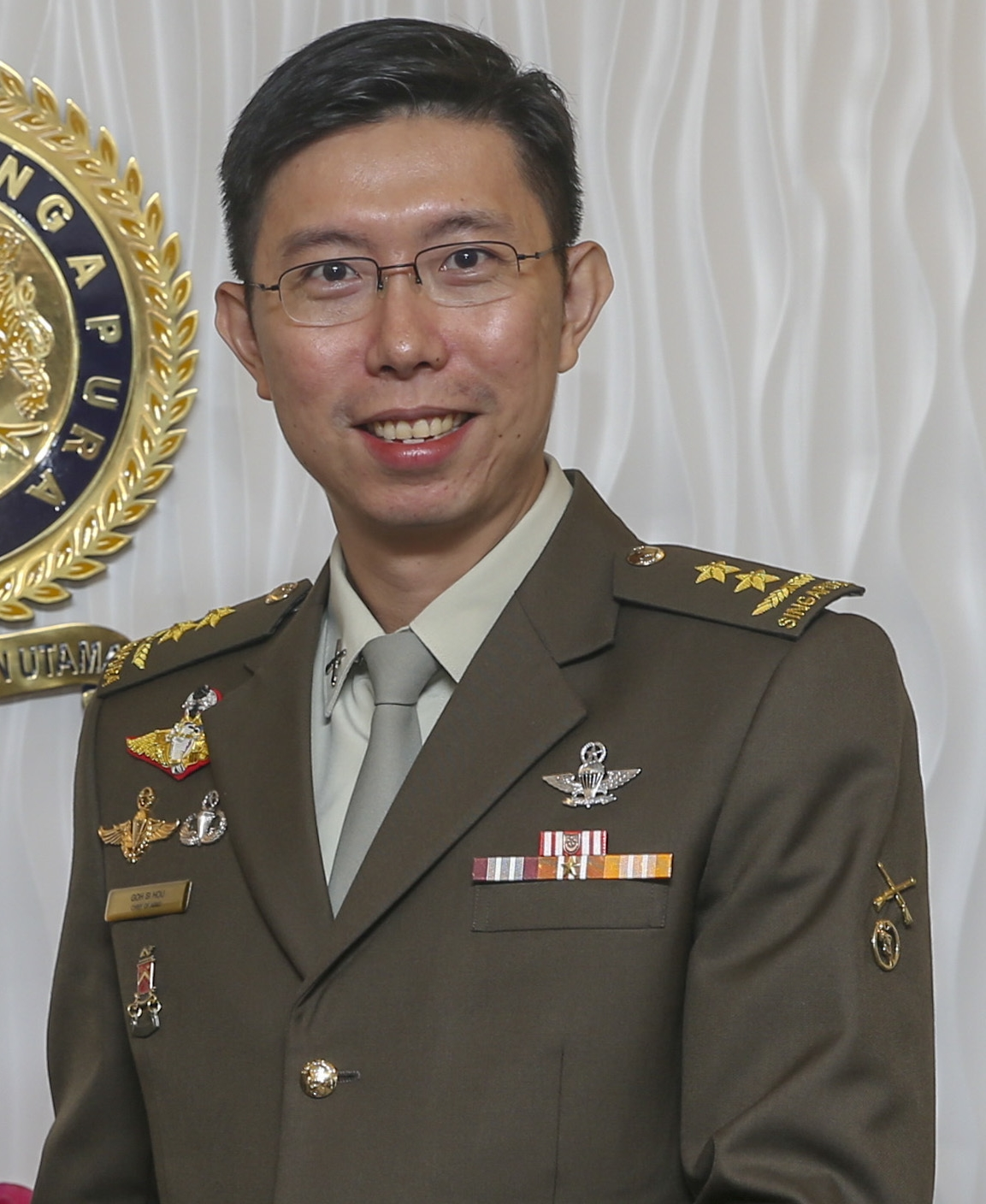
- Goh in 2019
- Born: 1979 (age 46–47); Singapore
- Allegiance: Singapore
- Branch: Singapore Army
- Service years: 1997–2022
- Rank: Major-General
- Commands: Chief of Army (2018–2022); Assistant Chief of the General Staff (Plans); Commander, 3rd Division Artillery; Commanding Officer, 20th Battalion Singapore Artillery
- Education: University of Cambridge; Stanford University

Goh Si Hou PPA(E) PPA(G) (Chinese: 吴仕豪; pinyin: Wú Shìháo) is a Singaporean former major-general who served as Chief of Army between 2018 and 2022.

== Education ==
Goh attended Hwa Chong Junior College before graduating from University of Cambridge with a Bachelor of Arts (First Class) degree in economics under the Singapore Armed Forces (SAF) Overseas Scholarship as a President's Scholar.

He also completed a Master of Arts degree in international policy studies and a Master of Science degree in management at Stanford University.

== Military career ==
Goh enlisted in the Singapore Armed Forces (SAF) in January 1997 and served in the Singapore Army as an Artillery officer. In 2019, he succeeded Melvyn Ong as the Chief of Army.

== Non-military career ==
In 2018, Goh was appointed to be a board member of Housing Development Board (HDB), with the term lasting till 30 September 2020.

On 1 April 2021, Goh was appointed to be a board member of the Public Utilities Board (PUB). Subsequently, on 22 July 2022, he took over as the chief executive officer of the Public Utilities Board (PUB).

== Honours ==
- Public Administration Medal (Military) (Gold), in 2021
- Public Administration Medal (Military) (Bronze), in 2015
- Singapore Armed Forces Long Service and Good Conduct (20 Years) Medal
- Singapore Armed Forces Long Service and Good Conduct (10 Years) Medal with 15 year clasp
- Singapore Armed Forces Good Service Medal
- Knight Grand Cross of the Order of the Crown of Thailand
- Army Meritorious Service Star, 1st Class - Indonesia (2024)

== Personal life ==
Goh is married with two children.

Military offices
Preceded by Melvyn Ong	Chief of the Singapore Army; 2018–2022	Succeeded by David Neo
