= Dieppe Barracks =

Military base in Singapore

- Sembawang Road in Singapore

Site information
- Type: Military base
- Owner: Ministry of Defence
- Operator: Singapore Armed Forces
- Open to the public: No

Location
- Coordinates: 1°25′19.9″N 103°49′30.1″E

Site history
- Built: 1960s

Garrison information
- Garrison: HQ Guards

Dieppe Barracks is a military base of the Singapore Armed Forces (SAF) located along Sembawang Road in Singapore near Khatib Camp and Sembawang Air Base. It is currently occupied by HQ Guards.

== History ==
Dieppe Barracks was built in the 1960s by the British Armed Forces for the Royal Marines and became operational in 1962. It was occupied by the 40 Commando Royal Marines of the 3 Commando Brigade from 1962 to 1971.

After the British Armed Forces left Singapore, Dieppe Barracks was handed over to the New Zealand Force South East Asia (NZFORSEA). The 1st Battalion Royal New Zealand Infantry Regiment, which was based in the nearby Nee Soon Camp, then occupied Dieppe Barracks from 1971 to 1989.

In 1979, Dieppe Barracks hosted 51 Vietnamese refugees, including 18 children, who had been granted asylum by New Zealand, during their eight-hour transit in Singapore.

NZFORSEA departed Singapore in 1989 with the New Zealand flag was lowered over Dieppe Barracks for the last time on 21 July. Dieppe Barracks was then handed over to the Singapore Armed Forces and it has been occupied by HQ Guards since then.

As of October 2019, Dieppe Barracks was occupied by HQ Guards and HQ 13th Singapore Infantry Brigade.

In 2024, Veterans' Affairs New Zealand announced that the Guards formation had informed them that all current buildings in Dieppe Barracks were to be removed with the exception of the old 1RNZIR Sergeants’ Mess and the Old Tasman Club. Both buildings would be maintained and preserved as heritage buildings. The Sergeants’ Mess would be converted into a history room for both the SAF Guards Division and Dieppe Barracks, while the Old Tasman Club will be used by the Guards Division’s leadership and command teams. A memorial would also be erected with the names of the 23 Army personnel who died there on service and an historical inscription for 1RNZIR and would be in place by April 2026.
