= Supply (Singapore Army) =

- Logo of Supply
- Active: 1990 – present
- Country: Singapore
- Branch: Singapore Army
- Type: Military logistics
- Part of: Singapore Armed Forces
- Garrison/HQ: Kranji Camp III
- Mottos: "Reliable, Efficient, Professional"
- Colors: Dark Blue
- Website: Official website

Commanders
- Chief Supply Officer: ME6 Mok Shao Wei

Supply is the formation of the Singapore Army responsible for planning, commanding and providing supply support to the Army and ground logistical support to the Navy and Air Force. It is made up of HQ Supply and the East and West Supply Hubs, which manage Asset Management Teams (AMTs), Logistic Service Liaison Teams (LSLT), and Food & Beverage Managers at cookhouses in the various SAF military installations. They are also in charge of feeding and equipping SAF personnel, facilities management, camp maintenance, and warehouse management at the Army Logistics Base (ALB).

== History ==
Before 1990, the G4 branch of the Army was in charge of four logistics formations: Supply, Transport, Maintenance, and General Staff Command. In 1990, the Supply and Transport formations were integrated to form a single formation under the command of HQ Army Logistics Command (HQ ALCOM). HQ ALCOM became defunct in 1994 following a reorganisation and HQ Supply & Transport (HQ S&T) was created to replace it.

On 1 October 2006, HQ S&T separated into the Supply and Transport formations. The Supply formation consists of HQ Supply and the East and West Supply Hubs. HQ Supply took charge of the management of messing supervisors and cookhouses.

== Organisation ==
Supply formation consists of 3 unit HQ and 2 Supply Hubs

- HQ Supply
- East Supply Hubs
  - Asset Readiness Section and Ops & Planning Section.
  - The hubs manage Asset Management Teams (AMT)
  - Logistic Service Liaison Teams (LSLT)
  - F&B Managers in Cookhouses
- West Supply Hubs
  - Asset Readiness Section and Ops & Planning Section
  - The hubs manage Asset Management Teams (AMT)
  - Logistic Service Liaison Teams (LSLT)
  - F&B Managers in Cookhouses.
