= 2nd People's Defence Force =

- Logo of 2nd People's Defence Force
- Active: April 1985 – present
- Country: Singapore
- Branch: Singapore Army
- Type: Unconventional Warfare
- Role: CBRN defense Homeland defense
- Size: Division
- Part of: Singapore Armed Forces
- Garrison/HQ: Clementi Camp
- Motto: "Steadfast We Stand"
- Website: Official website

Commanders
- Commander, 2nd People's Defence Force: COL Muhammad Helmi Bin Khaswan

The 2nd People's Defence Force (2 PDF) is a division of the Singapore Army responsible for maintaining peace within Singapore and carrying out mainly combined arms, counterterrorism, force protection, homeland defense, homeland security, internal security, and maneuver warfare.

== History ==
The 2nd People's Defence Force traces its origins to October 1965 when the People's Defence Force Headquarters (PDF HQ) was established as part of the Ministry of Interior and Defence and tasked with recruiting 3,200 volunteers to defend Singapore. In 1968, the PDF was reorganised to take on operational roles in maintaining internal security within Singapore.

In May 1974, facing dwindling numbers of volunteers, the 101 People’s Defence Force Battalion (101 PDF) was formed, amalgamating various other volunteer units.

On 1 April 1985, the 101 People’s Defence Force Battalion was disbanded and split between two commands, the 1st People's Defence Force (1 PDF) and 2nd People's Defence Force, the latter of which became HQ of the PDF. On 6 December 2004, 1 PDF disbanded and had its units transferred across the three combined arms divisions.

After 9/11, HQ 2 PDF Command was reorganised to form the multi-agency Island Defence Headquarters (IDHQ) to protect Singapore against terrorism. They initiated operations to provide round-the-clock protection of key military and civilian installations around Singapore.

In 2010, the IDHQ became the Island Defence Task Force (IDTF) and the 1st Singapore Infantry Brigade (1 SIB) was created, taking command of the 6th, 8th and 9th Battalions, Singapore Infantry Regiment (SIR). The Military Police Command, Military Band and Gombak Base (Ministry of Defence headquarters) came under the 2nd People's Defence Force's command in 2011.

In 2015, the 2nd People's Defence Force introduced the Peacekeeper Protected Response Vehicle (PRV) to replace the V-200s previously used for island defence operations.

== Organisation ==
The 2nd People’s Defence Force has the following organization:

2nd People’s Defence Force / Island Defence Task Force (2 PDF/IDTF):

- SAF Military Police Command
- 8th Battalion, Singapore Infantry Regiment (8 SIR)
- 9th Battalion, Singapore Infantry Regiment (9 SIR)
- 15th Command, Control, Communications and Intelligence Battalion (15 C4I Bn)
- 7th Singapore Infantry Brigade (7 SIB)
- 21st Singapore Infantry Brigade (21 SIB)
- 22nd Singapore Infantry Brigade (22 SIB)
- 26th Singapore Infantry Brigade (26 SIB)
- 27th Singapore Infantry Brigade (27 SIB)
- 29th Singapore Infantry Brigade (29 SIB)
- 32nd Singapore Infantry Brigade (32 SIB)
- 326th Battalion, Singapore Combat Engineers (326 SCE)
- 329th Battalion, Singapore Combat Engineers (329 SCE)
- Island Defence Training Institute (IDTI)
