= Infantry (Singapore Army) =

- Logo of the Infantry Formation and 9th Division
- Active: 1957 – present
- Country: Singapore
- Branch: Singapore Army
- Type: Infantry
- Size: 8 active battalions plus reserve battalions
- Part of: Singapore Armed Forces
- Garrison/HQ: Clementi Camp; Kranji Camp III; Maju Camp; Selarang Camp; Pasir Laba Camp
- Motto: "Forging Ahead"
- Colors: Olive Green
- Engagements: Indonesia–Malaysia confrontation
- Website: Official website

Commanders
- Chief Infantry Officer: BG Fairoz Bin Hassan

Infantry is the largest formation of the Singapore Army, comprising six active battalions—the 1st, 2nd, 3rd, 5th, 8th and 9th Battalions, Singapore Infantry Regiment (SIR)—based in Clementi Camp, Kranji Camp III, Maju Camp, Pasir Laba Camp, Selarang Camp and, an undisclosed number of reservist battalions. The Infantry formation shares the same command as that of the Singapore Army's 9th Division.

== History ==
The Infantry formation started with the creation of the 1st Battalion, Singapore Infantry Regiment (1 SIR) on 12 March 1957 when Singapore was moving towards self-government. On 4 March 1957, young men born and raised in Singapore were recruited to serve in 1 SIR. Out of 1,420 applicants, only 237 were accepted for training. 1 SIR was intended to be combined with another battalion to form a regiment.

After Singapore's self-governance in 1959, 1 SIR replaced the Gurkha Contingent for guard mounting at the Istana, the official residence of the president of Singapore. Two years later, 1 SIR received its regimental colours. In 1962, the 2nd Battalion, Singapore Infantry Regiment (2 SIR) was formed.

From 1963 to 1965, when Singapore was part of Malaysia, the Singapore Infantry Regiment was renamed the Malaysian Infantry Regiment. The two battalions were called to serve during the Indonesia–Malaysia confrontation, with 1 SIR and 2 SIR deployed to Sebatik Island, Sabah and Labis, Johor respectively.

When Singapore gained independence in 1965, the regiment was renamed back to the Singapore Infantry Regiment. Two years later, two more battalions—3 SIR and 4 SIR—were formed when National Service (NS) was introduced in Singapore. Over the years, four more battalions—5 SIR, 6 SIR, 7 SIR and 8 SIR—were created. In 1977 and 1978, 7 SIR and 8 SIR were converted to the 1st and 2nd Battalions of the Guards formation. 8 SIR was re-created later as an Infantry battalion.

On 15 January 1980, the Singapore Army set up the HQ Infantry to oversee all infantry doctrinal and training matters up to the battalion level. On 17 August 2004, the HQ Infantry merged with the 9th Division (9 DIV) to form the HQ 9 DIV/Infantry.

In May 2011, 2 SIR was converted into a motorised infantry battalion, with the Army announcing its plan to convert three more battalions to motorised infantry such that there would be one motorised infantry battalion in each of its three divisions.

4 SIR was dissolved on 3 March 2020 after its last mono-intake became operationally ready on 17 January 2020.

On 13 August 2021, the last mono-intake of 6 SIR became operationally ready. 6 SIR was dissolved shortly after.

== Organisation ==
There are currently six active Infantry battalions, of which four — 1 SIR, 2 SIR, 3 SIR, 5 SIR — are each assigned to an Infantry brigade in one of the Army's three combined arms divisions, while the remaining two — 8 SIR and 9 SIR — are under the 2nd People's Defence Force.

List of Infantry Brigades
| Name | Division | Base |
|---|---|---|
| 3rd Singapore Infantry Brigade (3 SIB) | 3rd Division | Kranji Camp III |
| 5th Singapore Infantry Brigade (5 SIB) | 3rd Division | Jurong Camp |
| 24th Singapore Infantry Brigade (24 SIB) | 3rd Division | Maju Camp |
| 9th Singapore Infantry Brigade (9 SIB) | 6th Division | Mandai Hill Camp |
| 76th Singapore Infantry Brigade (76 SIB) | 6th Division | Mandai Hill Camp |
| 2nd Singapore Infantry Brigade (2 SIB) | 9th Division | Mandai Hill Camp |
| 10th Singapore Infantry Brigade (10 SIB) | 9th Division | Selarang Camp |
| 12th Singapore Infantry Brigade (12 SIB) | 9th Division | Selarang Camp |
| 23rd Singapore Infantry Brigade (23 SIB) | 9th Division | Selarang Camp |
| 7 Singapore Infantry Brigade (7 SIB) | 2nd People's Defence Force | Bedok Camp |
| 22nd Singapore Infantry Brigade (22 SIB) | 2nd People's Defence Force | Nee Soon Driclad Centre |
| 26th Singapore Infantry Brigade (26 SIB) | 2nd People's Defence Force | Clementi Camp |
| 27th Singapore Infantry Brigade (27 SIB) | 2nd People's Defence Force | Clementi Camp |
| 29th Singapore Infantry Brigade (29 SIB) | 2nd People's Defence Force | Clementi Camp |
| 32nd Singapore Infantry Brigade (32 SIB) | 2nd People's Defence Force | Clementi Camp |

List of Infantry Battalions
| Name | Division | Motto | Regimental Colours | Base |
|---|---|---|---|---|
| 2nd Battalion, Singapore Infantry Regiment (2 SIR) | 3rd Division | Second to None | Red | Kranji Camp III |
| 5th Battalion, Singapore Infantry Regiment (5 SIR) | 3rd Division | Silent, Deadly, Swift | Brown | Kranji Camp III |
| 1st Battalion, Singapore Infantry Regiment (1 SIR) | 9th Division | First and Foremost | Yellow | Pasir Laba Camp |
| 3rd Battalion, Singapore Infantry Regiment (3 SIR) | 9th Division | Silent and Effective | Green | Selarang Camp |
| 8th Battalion, Singapore Infantry Regiment (8 SIR) | 2nd People's Defence Force | Ready and Vigilant | Maroon | Clementi Camp |
| 9th Battalion, Singapore Infantry Regiment (9 SIR) | 2nd People's Defence Force | Vigilant and Resilient | Orange | Maju Camp |
