= 9th Singapore Division =

- Logo of 9th Singapore Division
- Active: 1 October 1978 – present
- Country: Singapore
- Branch: Singapore Army
- Type: Combined arms
- Part of: Singapore Armed Forces
- Garrison/HQ: Selarang Camp
- Motto: "Forging Ahead"
- Website: Official website

Commanders
- Commander, 9th Division: BG Fairoz Bin Hassan

The 9th Singapore Division (9 DIV) is a combined arms division of the Singapore Army. It shares the same command as the Infantry formation of the Army.

== History ==
The 9th Division was formed on 1 October 1978 as a reserve division to manage and train reservist units before it became a combined arms division on 31 March 1992. On 1 January 1995, the 9th Division was restructured to include both active and reservist personnel. On 17 August 2004, the 9th Division and HQ Infantry merged to form HQ 9th Singapore Division/Infantry.

== Organisation ==
The 9th Singapore Division has the following organization:

9th Singapore Division / Infantry (9 Div/Inf):

- 2nd Singapore Infantry Brigade (2 SIB)
- 10th Singapore Infantry Brigade (10 SIB)
- 12th Singapore Infantry Brigade (12 SIB)
- 23rd Singapore Infantry Brigade (23 SIB)
- 54th Singapore Armoured Brigade (54 SAB)
- 9th Division Artillery (9 Div Arty)
- 9th Division Support Command (9 DISCOM)
- 9th Signal Battalion (9 Sig Bn)
- 327th Battalion, Singapore Combat Engineers (327 SCE)
- 9th Divisional Air Defence Artillery Battalion (9 DA Bn)
