= SAF Ammunition Command =

Ammunition Command
- Logo of the SAF Ammunition Command
- Active: February 1967 – present
- Country: Singapore
- Branch: Singapore Army
- Type: Military logistics
- Part of: Singapore Armed Forces
- Garrison/HQ: Kranji Camp III; Rifle Range Road Camp
- Mottos: "The Heart of SAF’s Firepower", "A Pillar of Confidence"
- Colors: Dark blue
- Website: Official website

Commanders
- Commander, Ammunition Command: ME7 Jason Chia

The Ammunition Command is the formation of the Singapore Army responsible for providing the Singapore Armed Forces (SAF) with ammunition, explosives supply chain management and technical support for ammunition. Besides taking charge of the maintenance and storage of ammunition and explosives, they provide support for the fireworks display at national events such as the National Day Parade and Southeast Asian Games.

== History ==
The Ammunition Command started as the Weapon Ammunition and Optical Base (WAOB) in February 1967 at Mount Vernon Camp. The first ammunition company in the WAOB later expanded to become the Ammunition Control Company and later the SAF Ammunition Base. In late 1967, the Pasir Laba Ammunition Depot was officially opened for the storage of ammunition and explosives for all three branches of the Singapore Armed Forces (SAF): the Army, the Navy, and the Air Force.

In 1994, the SAF Ammunition Base became the first unit in the Army to achieve ISO 9002 certification. On 23 May 2006, the SAF Ammunition Command was formed at Rifle Range Road Camp to centralise ammunition command operations for all three branches of the SAF. In April 2010, the SAF introduced the Military Domain Experts Scheme (MDES), a separate rank structure which runs parallel to the SAF's conventional rank system. Ammunition Command regulars who have converted to the MDES, or joined after the MDES was introduced, hold ranks from Military Expert 1 (ME1) to Military Expert 8 (ME8).
