= Maintenance and Engineering Support =

- Logo of Maintenance & Engineering Support
- Active: 1984 – present
- Country: Singapore
- Branch: Singapore Army
- Type: Military engineering maintenance
- Part of: Singapore Armed Forces
- Garrison/HQ: Kranji Camp III
- Motto: "Excellence Through Professionalism"
- Colours: Dark Blue
- Website: Official website

Commanders
- Chief Maintenance and Engineering Officer: ME7 Anthony Chor

Maintenance and Engineering Support is the formation of the Singapore Army responsible for military engineering maintenance. It provides maintenance and engineering support to the Army by ensuring high operational equipment readiness for the Army and the Singapore Armed Forces (SAF) at sustainable budget and manpower resources. It also train technicians and operator-maintainers (OMers) to perform field repairs in military exercises and training.

The formation also has collaborations with other organisations such as the Defence Science and Technology Agency (DSTA), ST Kinetics and the National Additive Manufacturing and Innovation Cluster (NAMIC).

== History ==
The formation started as HQ Maintenance in 1984 to oversee the Army's maintenance battalions and maintenance training school. In 1994, it was renamed Maintenance and Engineering Support (MES) after the reorganisation of Army Logistics Command (ALCOM) and G4 Army. MES received the ISO 9001 certification in 1995, People Developer Standard in 2001, ISO 14001 certification in 2002, and OHSAS 18001 certification in 2005.

The MES formation shifted from Ayer Rajah Camp to Kranji Camp III in 2010. In April that year, the Singapore Armed Forces (SAF) had introduced the Military Domain Experts Scheme (MDES), a separate rank structure which runs parallel to the SAF's conventional rank system. MES regulars who have converted to the MDES, or joined after the MDES was introduced, hold ranks from Military Expert 1 (ME1) to Military Expert 8 (ME8).

== Operations ==
The MES formation has provided support to the SAF in disaster relief, humanitarian aid and peace support operations over the years, such as during the 1986 Hotel New World collapse in Singapore, the 2004 Indian Ocean earthquake and tsunami, and in Afghanistan in 2010 when the SAF's Weapon Location Radar (WLR) engineering team provided field innovation to sustain the radar under harsh environmental conditions.
