= Transport (Singapore Army) =

- Logo of Transport
- Active: 1990 – present
- Country: Singapore
- Branch: Singapore Army
- Type: Military logistics
- Part of: Singapore Armed Forces
- Garrison/HQ: Kranji Camp III & Sembawang Camp
- Mottos: "Reliable, Efficient, Professional"
- Colors: Dark Blue
- Website: Official website

Commanders
- Chief Transport Officer: COL Quek Shi Jian

Transport is the formation of the Singapore Army responsible for planning, commanding and providing transport support to the Army, ensuring that manpower, equipment and supplies are delivered to their destinations.

== History ==
The Transport formation traces its origins to the Singapore Volunteer Artillery Cyclist section, which was formed in 1898. After Singapore gained independence in 1965, the Singapore Armed Forces (SAF) Transport Base which then consisted of only two companies – a Light Transport Company and a Motor Transport Training Company – took charge of all transportation functions in the SAF.

Before 1990, the G4 branch of the Army was in charge of four logistics formations: Supply, Transport, Maintenance, and General Staff Command. In 1990, the Supply and Transport formations were integrated to form a single formation under the command of HQ Army Logistics Command (HQ ALCOM). HQ ALCOM became defunct in 1994 following a reorganisation and HQ Supply & Transport (HQ S&T) was created to replace it.

Previously, there were 86 different Motor Transport (MT) Lines in the Army, each tailored to the needs of their respective units. In 2003, the SAF introduced Centralised MT Lines and created 14 divisional MT Lines to improve efficiency and centralise resources at the division/formation level. On 1 October 2006, HQ S&T separated into the Transport and Supply formations. In the same year, the 14 divisional MT Lines were consolidated into three Transport Hubs in the North, East and West, in response to decreasing transport operator resources, an increasing number of fleet vehicles, and escalating holding costs.

In 2008, the SAF created a fourth Transport Hub, the Transport Hub Central, which took over the Navy's land transport office and expanded its sea terminal operational role through integration with the Navy's sea terminal elements.

== Roles ==
The Transport formation carries out operations on land, sea and air. On land, it plans and executes troop lifts, supply distribution operations, and provides for the movement of Security Troopers, who protect key installations around Singapore.

For sea operations, the Transport formation works with the Navy at wharves and piers to provide logistical support to various SAF units during overseas exercises and humanitarian aid missions. They use the LARC-V to deliver supplies and equipment across bodies of water, and evacuate casualties during operations and disaster relief.

The Transport formation also uses the underslung ferrying method which involves the use of the Air Force's aircraft such as the Super Puma and Chinook helicopters to provide rapid movement of heavy equipment, emergency supplies and ammunition. They also deliver supplies and equipment via air drop, using aircraft such as the C-130.

== Organisation ==
- Transport Hub North (or 1st SAF Transport Battalion)
- Transport Hub East
- Transport Hub West
- Transport Hub Central (or 3rd SAF Transport Battalion)

== Equipment ==
Equipment	Image	Notes	References
Ops Utility Vehicle (OUV)			
5-ton MAN Truck 16.284 LAERC GS			
Light Transporter 6-ton 18.280 TGM 4X4			
F550 Combat Ambulance			
