= Guards (Singapore Army) =

Light infantry formation of the Army

- Logo of the Guards Formation
- Active: 1 January 1975 – present
- Country: Singapore
- Branch: Singapore Army
- Type: Light Infantry
- Role: Rapid deployment; Air assault; Expeditionary warfare; Amphibious warfare
- Size: Brigade
- Part of: Singapore Armed Forces
- Garrison/HQ: Bedok Camp; Dieppe Barracks; Nee Soon Camp
- Motto: "Ready to Strike"
- Colour: Khaki
- Website: Official website

Commanders
- Chief Guards Officer: BG Wong Pui Chuan

The Singapore Armed Forces Guards Formation is an elite heliborne light infantry formation of the Singapore Army, specialising in conducting rapid deployment, air assault, expeditionary, and amphibious operations.

The commander of the Guards Formation is Chief Guards Officer Brigadier General Wong Pui Chuan.

== History ==
The Guards Formation was created on 1 January 1975 as the 7th Singapore Infantry Brigade (7 SIB) with four officers, five specialists and a few clerks. 7 SIB subsequently took command of the Infantry Training Depot (ITD) on 1 January 1976 and the 7th Battalion, Singapore Infantry Regiment (7 SIR) and 8th Battalion, Singapore Infantry Regiment (8 SIR) on 9 February 1976. On 1 July 1976, 7 SIB was declared operational. In view of its operational role, the ITD was removed from 7 SIB, and the SAF Guards Unit (SAFGU), formed in the 1960s for guard mounting at the Istana and other public duties activities, came under the command of 7 SIB.

SAFGU was renamed 1st Battalion, Singapore Guards (1 Guards) on 1 July 1977. On 1 April 1978, 8 SIR became the 2nd Battalion, Singapore Guards (2 Guards). 7 SIB was designated as an brigade on 1 April 1978. On 6 April 1979, 1 Guards held a parade during which Major-General Winston Choo, Chief of General Staff, presented the soldiers with berets with new cap badge backings to denote their designation of Guards as a distinction for completing the Guards Conversion Course.

On 31 July 1980, the soldiers of 7 SIB was reorganised into a Brigade consisting of only Guards. 7 SIR was renamed 3rd Battalion, Singapore Guards (3 Guards). The three Guards battalions received their colours on 11 June 1983. On 23 June 1989, and received the Guards tab, which all personnel in the Guards formation wear on the left sleeves of their uniforms.

On 9 June 1994, the Guards adopted the khaki beret to replace the olive green beret, which is still used by the Infantry formation. On 11 October 1994, the Guards formally became a formation of the Singapore Army. All Guards units, including 7 SIB and operationally ready units, are now under the administration and command of HQ Guards.

On 12 July 2016, the Army Deployment Force (ADF) was officially inaugurated at Nee Soon Camp as part of the Guards Formation.

HQ Guards was initially located at Nee Soon Camp. As of October 2019, HQ Guards is located at Dieppe Barracks.

Guards are required to have higher standards in their individual physical proficiency test and standard obstacle course test.

== Operations ==
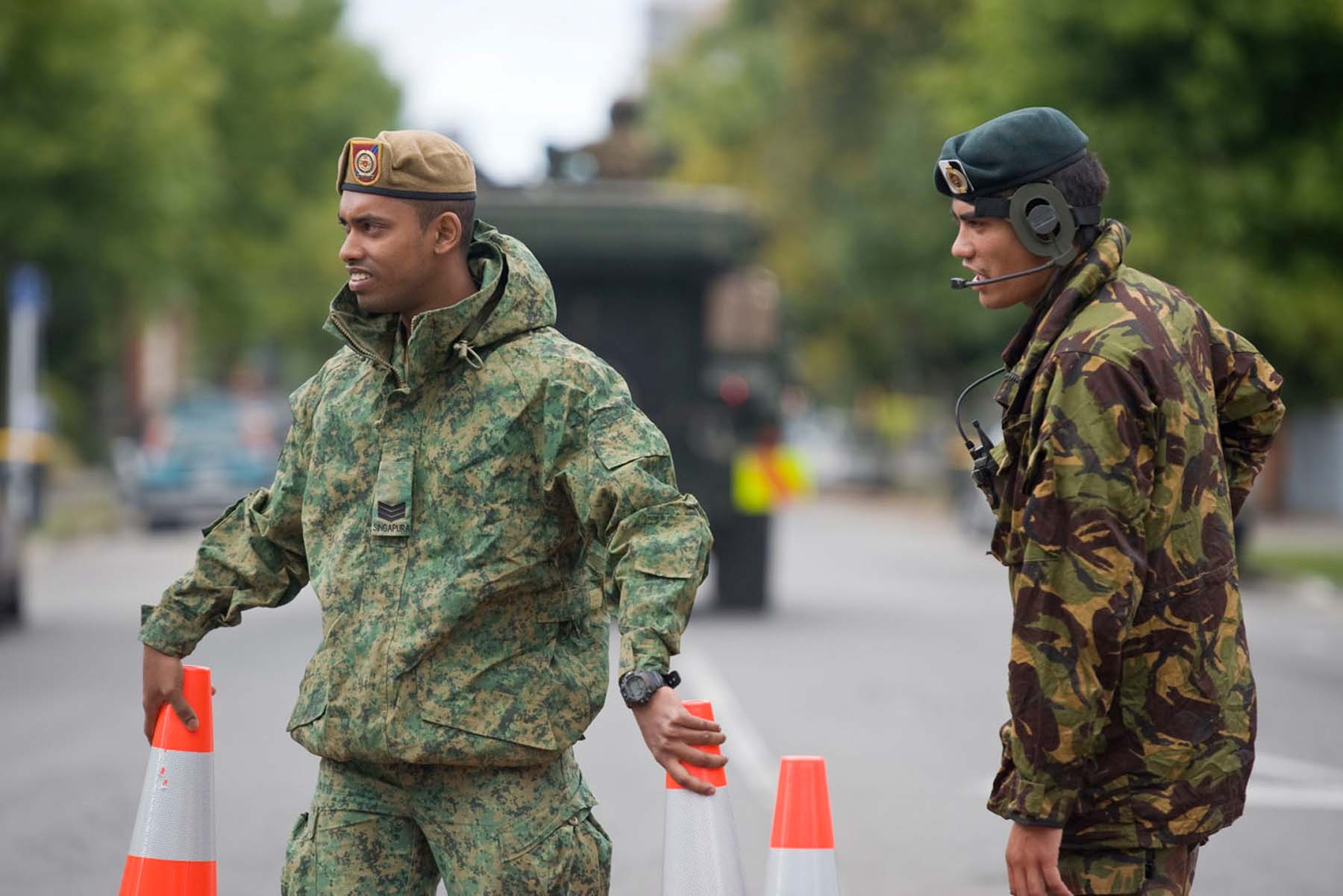
A Third Sergeant and a member of the New Zealand Defence Force man a cordon around the Central City in the aftermath of the 2011 Christchurch earthquake.

Guards have been deployed to provide support in disaster relief and humanitarian aid operations, such as during the 1986 Hotel New World collapse in Singapore, the 2004 Indian Ocean earthquake and tsunami, the 2011 Christchurch earthquake, the Aceh Monitoring Mission in Timor Leste and the humanitarian aid mission in Afghanistan from 2007 to 2013.

== Training ==
Trainees undergo four weeks of the Guards Conversion Course (GCC) to qualify as a Guards. The course includes rappelling, helicopter live rappelling 10km combat march, 1km coastal swim, platoon battle course, summary exercise, beach physical training.

The Guards Formation specialises in amphibious operations and heliborne insertions into combat zones. They can do this either by rapid disembarkation while the helicopter is landing, by rappelling from a hovering helicopter, or fast-roping straight onto rooftops. As landing zones may be hostile, Guards train in various forms of combat rappelling, such as head-first rappelling and Australian rappelling. They are also trained to rappel unconventionally such as rappelling with their back to the cliff, and with a stretcher.

== Exercises ==
- Exercise Valiant Mark White with the United States Marine Corps
- Exercise Trident White with the Australian Defence Force

== Organisation ==
- HQ Guards Formation, Dieppe Barracks
  - Guards Training Centre (GTC), Chong Pang Camp
  - Army Deployment Force (ADF), Nee Soon Camp
  - 7th Singapore Infantry Brigade (7 SIB), Bedok Camp
    - 1st Battalion, Singapore Guards (1 GDS), Dieppe Barracks
    - 2nd Battalion, Singapore Guards (2 GDS)
    - 3rd Battalion, Singapore Guards (3 GDS), Bedok Camp

== Equipment ==
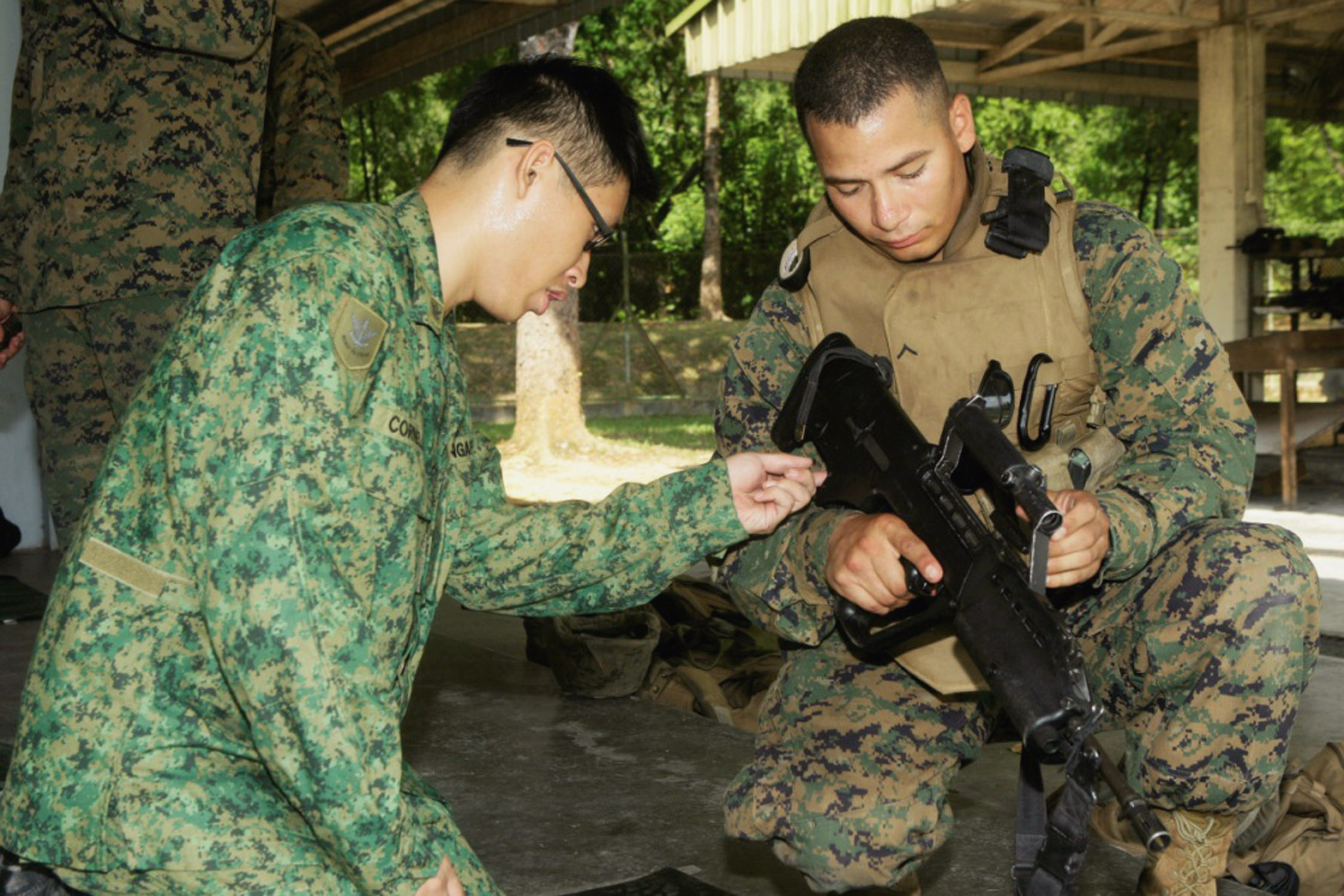
A Second Sergeant and a United States Marine examine a SAR 21 during the 2009 Cooperation Afloat Readiness and Training (CARAT) exercise.

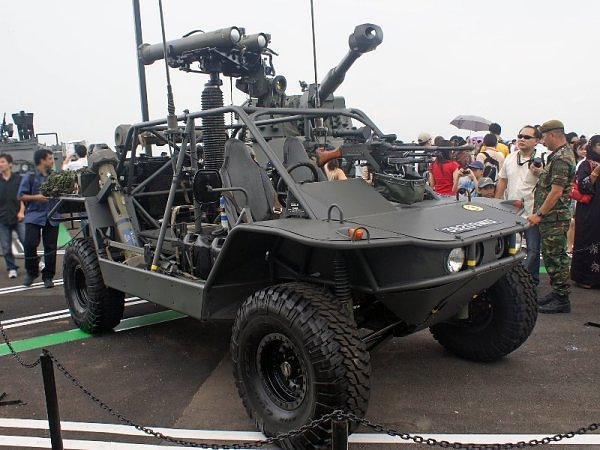
Spider LSV with SPIKE ATGM launcher, from the Guards Light Strike Vehicle Coy at the 2008 Singapore Airshow.

| Equipment | Image | Origin | Notes | References |
|---|---|---|---|---|
| SAR 21 | | Singapore | | |
| Colt IAR6940E-SG | | United States | Replaced Ultimax 100 Used by designated section light machine gunner | |
| FN MAG | | Belgium | General Purpose Machine Gun Mounted on Light Strike Vehicle Mark II | |
| M203 grenade launcher | | United States | Attached to SAR 21 used by designated Section Grenadier | |
| Spike | | Israel | Mounted on Light Strike Vehicle Mark II | |
| Spider Light Strike Vehicle (LSV) Mark II | | Singapore | Can be configured with three variants: Automatic Grenade Launcher variant, which uses the STK 40 AGL; Anti-Tank Guided Missile variant, which uses the Spike missile system; General purpose variant, which used the 7.62 General Purpose Machine Gun | |
