= Army Deployment Force =

Singapore military unit

- Logo of the Army Deployment Force
- Active: 2016 – present
- Country: Singapore
- Branch: Singapore Army
- Type: Rapid deployment force
- Role: Counter-terrorism; Expeditionary warfare; Humanitarian aid; Disaster relief
- Size: 600 personnel
- Part of: Guards Formation
- Garrison/HQ: Nee Soon Camp
- Motto: Always Ready

Commanders
- Notable commanders: Senior Lieutenant Colonel Chua Yu En, Edwin

The Army Deployment Force (ADF) is a rapid deployment unit of the Singapore Army responsible for conducting counter-terrorism and expeditionary operations. The ADF was established in 2016, in response to modern terrorist attacks such as the November 2015 Paris attacks. It consists of only regular servicemen.

ADF is also deployed for Peace Support Operations and Humanitarian Assistance and Disaster Relief missions.

== History ==
=== Unit Inauguration ===
The ADF was officially inaugurated on 12 July 2016 in Nee Soon Camp, with roughly 600 regular servicemen at the time of inception. This discrete rapid deployment force is operationally-ready to a high readiness state, ready to respond to any civil emergencies and actively able to respond "at short notice". The ADF's motto is "Always Ready".

Its first operational mission began in August 2016, when ADF service personnel; were rotationally deployed to Iraq as cover safety and protection for the medical teams by Singapore to assist the international coalition forces that are in combat with the Islamic State of Iraq and the Levant (ISIL).

== Unit Colours ==
President Halimah Yacob presented the new Regimental Colours to Army Deployment Force (ADF), received by Commander ADF Senior Lieutenant Colonel Chua Yu En, Edwin on 1 July 2021, as part of the SAF Day Parade.

== Role ==
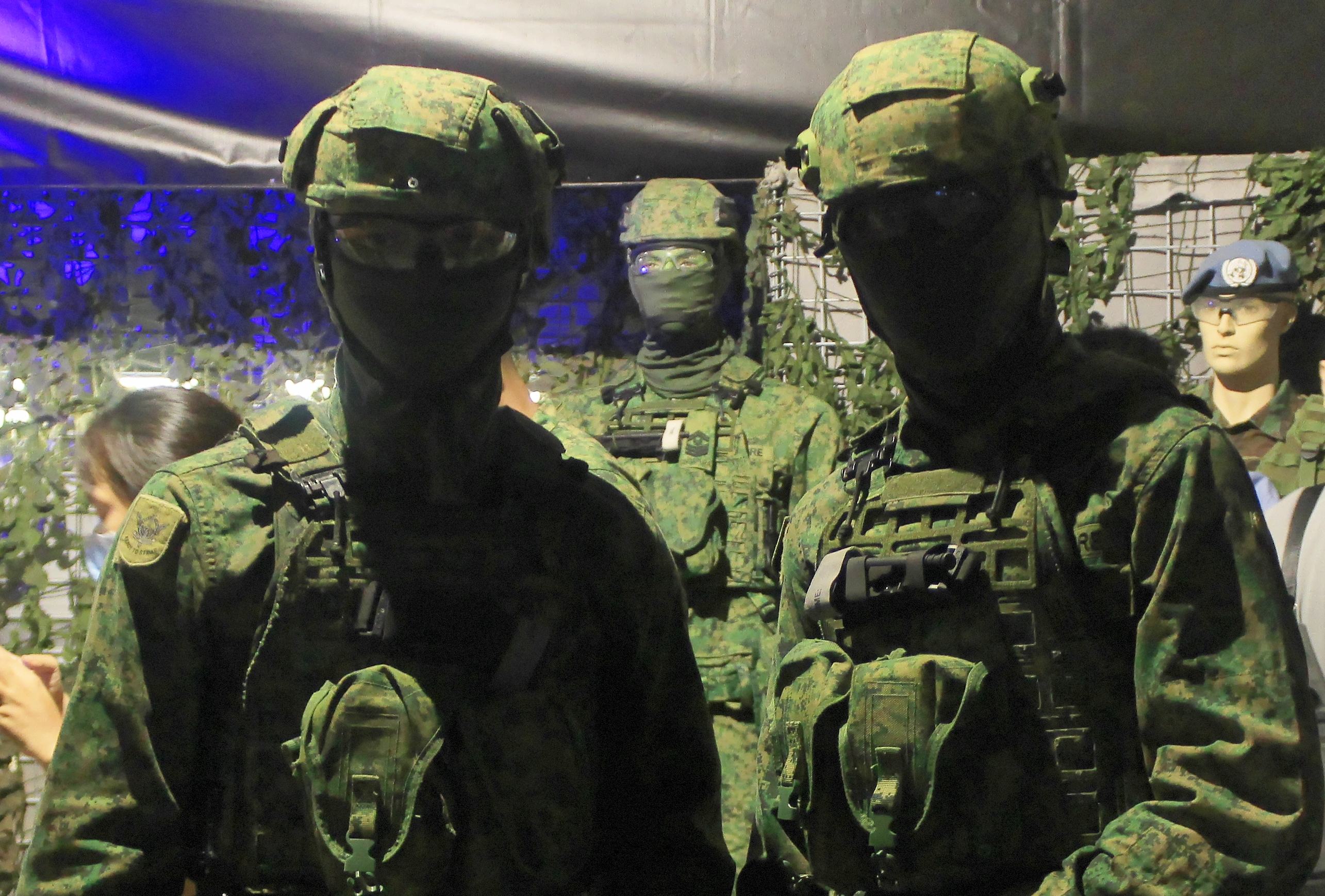
ADF Equipment and Uniform Display at AOH 2022

The ADF's primary role is to provide rapid response to terror threats or national exigencies in both urban and non-urban settings, and supporting the Special Operations Task Force (SOTF), Island Defence Task Force (IDTF), as well as the various Home Team agencies.

Secondarily, it can respond to civil emergencies or Peace Time Contingency Operations (PTCO). Additionally, it is also capable of being deployed for both Peace Support Operations (PSO) and Humanitarian Assistance and Disaster Relief operations (HADR) both within and around Singapore.

== Organisation ==
The Army Deployment Force has the following organisation:

- Headquarters ADF
- Protector company (Counter -Terrorism and Homeland Security)
- Peacekeeper company (Overseas and Coalition Operations)
- Preserver company (Humanitarian Assistance and Disaster Relief)
- Dragon company (Manages training and operational readiness)

== Training ==
ADF soldiers are trained to cover a wide spectrum of operations and various skillsets as operators develop their roles in the unit. ADF training is primarily conducted in Nee Soon Camp.

=== Combat Qualification Course ===
Trainees are required to complete the 21-week long Combat Qualification Course (CQC). The course trains and equips ADF trainees to respond to any threat or peacetime contingency quickly and effectively and test the physical and mental readiness of trainees.

The course covers a range of skillsets such as weapon proficiency, unarmed combat, conventional warfare, urban operations, fast-roping and rappelling, Peacetime Contingency Operations (PTCO), as well as Peace Support and Humanitarian Aid and Disaster Response (HADR) operations.

As part of their graduation criteria, trainees are required to complete a 10km march in 90 minutes, a warrior competition that tests their combat fitness and weapon competency, and an 18-hour finale exercise.

== Equipment ==
ADF Soldiers from Peacekeeper company, performing a squad level attack drill as part of Exercise Valiant Mark 2016 jointly conducted with the US Marines

Some of the equipment that the ADF utilise but not limited by include:

- SAR 21 Variants
  - SAR 21 MMS Carbine
  - SAR 21 M203
  - SAR 21 Sharpshooter
- SIG Sauer P226
- Heckler & Koch P30LS
- Remington 870 MCS
- KAC M110 Semi-Automatic Sniper System
- Colt IAR6940E-SG
- FN MAG
- Milkor MGL
- MATADOR (RGW90)
- Taser
- Ballistic Shield

Other than weapons, ADF also uses the Water Purification Units (WPU) trucks, Peacekeeper Protected Response Vehicle (PRVs) Protected Light Utility Vehicles (PLUVs) URO VAMTAC, and Protected Heavy MRAP Vehicles,.International MaxxPro Dash, the ADF's equipment varies depending on their tasks and mission.

== See also ==
- Guards
