= Army Intelligence (Singapore) =

- Logo of Army Intelligence
- Active: 9 February 1966 – present
- Country: Singapore
- Branch: Singapore Army
- Type: Military intelligence
- Role: Reconnaissance; Surveillance; Target acquisition Intelligence
- Part of: Singapore Armed Forces
- Garrison/HQ: Mandai Hill Camp
- Motto: "First Line of Defence"
- Website: Official website

Commanders
- Chief Army Intelligence Officer: COL Alroy Chua
- Chief Army Intelligence Officer (Designate): COL Ivan Du
- Formation Sergeant Major: MWO Glen Tan

Insignia
- Flag and Regimental Colour

Army Intelligence is the intelligence formation of the Singapore Army responsible for reconnaissance, surveillance and target acquisition (RSTA) operations to provide the Singapore Armed Forces (SAF) with information to facilitate effective decision-making by commanders.

All reconnaissance-trained soldiers in the Singapore Army wear the RECON tab on the left sleeves of their uniforms.

== History ==
The Army Intelligence formation started as the Department of Military Intelligence (DMI), which was formed on 9 February 1966 at Pearl's Hill. The Air Photo Unit and the School of Military Intelligence (SMI) were subsequently established in 1969.

A Sensor System Wing was created in SMI in 1988 to develop intelligence sensor systems for the Singapore Army.

The 1st Military Intelligence Battalion was formed in October 2004. The 10th and 11th Command, Control, Communications, Computers, Intelligence Battalions (10 C4I and 11 C4I) were formed in 2011.

== Equipment ==
The Army Intelligence formation uses unmanned aerial vehicles such as the Veloce-15, Skyblade III mini UAV, Mercedes Benz G Wagon, Yamaha motorcycles and Parrot Anafi.
