= 3rd Singapore Division =

- Logo of 3rd Singapore Division
- Active: 31 August 1970 – present
- Country: Singapore
- Branch: Singapore Army
- Type: Combined arms
- Part of: Singapore Armed Forces
- Garrison/HQ: Jurong Camp I
- Mottos: "Foremost and Utmost"
- Website: Official website

Commanders
- Current commander: BG Chong Shi Hao

The 3rd Singapore Division (3 DIV) is a combined arms division of the Singapore Army. Its current commander is BG Chong Shi Hao.

== History ==
The 3rd Division was formed on 31 August 1970 with six units under its command, which was then known as Area III Command HQ. On 1 May 1976, Area III Command was redesignated as the 3rd Singapore Infantry Division. It became the Singapore Army's first combined arms division on 21 March 1991 and has since been known as the 3rd Singapore Division. On 4 January 1995, the 3rd Division was reorganised to include both active and reservist units. In December 2004, after the drawdown of the 1st People's Defence Force, the 3rd Division took command of the 1st People's Defence Force's former units.

== Organisation ==
The 3rd Singapore Division has the following organization:

- 3rd Singapore Division (3 Div):
- 3rd Singapore Infantry Brigade (3 SIB)
  - 2nd Battalion, Singapore Infantry Regiment (2 SIR)
  - 5th Battalion, Singapore Infantry Regiment (5 SIR)
  - 754th Battalion, Singapore Infantry Regiment (754 SIR)
  - 746th Battalion, Singapore Infantry Regiment (746 SIR)
- 5th Singapore Infantry Brigade (5 SIB)
  - 778th Battalion, Singapore Infantry Regiment (778 SIR)
  - 789th Battalion, Singapore Infantry Regiment (789 SIR)
  - 798th Battalion, Singapore Infantry Regiment (798 SIR)
- 24th Singapore Infantry Brigade (24 SIB)
  - 733rd Battalion, Singapore Infantry Regiment (733 SIR)
  - 761st Battalion, Singapore Infantry Regiment (761 SIR)
  - 786th Battalion, Singapore Infantry Regiment (786 SIR)
- 8th Singapore Armoured Brigade (8 SAB)
  - 40th Battalion, Singapore Armoured Regiment (40 SAR)
  - 41st Battalion, Singapore Armoured Regiment (41 SAR)
  - 489th Battalion, Singapore Armoured Regiment (489 SAR)
- 3rd Division Artillery
  - 21st Battalions SA
  - 290th Battalions SA
  - 223rd Battalions SA
- 3rd Division Support Command
  - 31st Combat Service Support Battalion
  - 32nd Combat Service Support Battalion
  - 33rd Combat Service Support Battalion
  - 38th Combat Service Support Battalion
- 30th Battalion, Singapore Combat Engineers (30SCE)
- 321st Battalion, Singapore Combat Engineers (321SCE)
- 11th C4I Battalion
- 17th C4I Battalion
- 3rd Divisional Air Defence Artillery Battalion
- 3rd ISTAR Battalion
