= Kirpa Ram Vij =

Singaporean civil servant (1935–2022)

Brigadier-General Kirpa Ram Vij in 1972.

Kirpa Ram Vij (1935 – 29 October 2022) was an Indian-born Singaporean civil servant, business executive, and brigadier-general who served as Director, General Staff of the Singapore Armed Forces (SAF) between 1970 and 1974.

Vij was born in Hazara District in British India (now Pakistan) in 1935 and moved to Singapore after 1947. He graduated from the Raffles Institution in 1956. He later joined the Singapore Volunteer Corps as lieutenant in 1960.

Before becoming the Director, General Staff, Vij served in the civil service and was the Director of the Singapore Command and Staff College. He became a brigadier-general and was head of the SAF between 1970 and 1974.

After leaving the SAF, Vij became the Deputy Secretary in the Ministry of National Development between 1974 and 1975, then the Singapore Ambassador to Egypt between 1975 and 1979, and Head of Training at the Civil Service Institute until 1981.

Leaving the civil service, he became the general manager in Neptune Orient Lines in 1981.

Vij died on 29 October 2022, at the age of 87.

Military offices
Preceded by T. J. D. Campbell	3rd Director, General Staff of the Singapore Defence Force; 1970–1974	Succeeded by Winston Choo
