= Boys' Brigade in Singapore =

Singaporean youth organization

Coordinates: 1°17′29″N 103°49′54″E

The Boys' Brigade in Singapore
- Abbreviation: BB
- Founded: 1930; 96 years ago
- Type: Non-profit organisation
- Registration no.: S62SS0041D
- Legal status: Active
- Headquarters: 10 Kwong Avenue Singapore 348884
- Location: Singapore
- Members: ~6500 (2025)
- Official language: English
- Founder: Sir William Alexander Smith
- Singapore Founder: James Milner Fraser
- Honorary President: Lieutenant-General (Ret) Winston Choo
- Brigade President: Patrick Koh Ley Boon
- Website: www.bb.org.sg

The Boys' Brigade in Singapore is a christian youth organization and is part of the global Boys' Brigade movement which has been present in Singapore since 1930. It currently consists of over 900 officers and 5,600 Boys in over 130 Companies. The current Brigade President is Patrick Koh Ley Boon and the Honorary President is Lieutenant-General (Ret) Winston Choo, the former Chief of Defence Force of the Singapore Armed Forces.

The President of Singapore is the Patron of the Boys' Brigade in Singapore.

== History ==
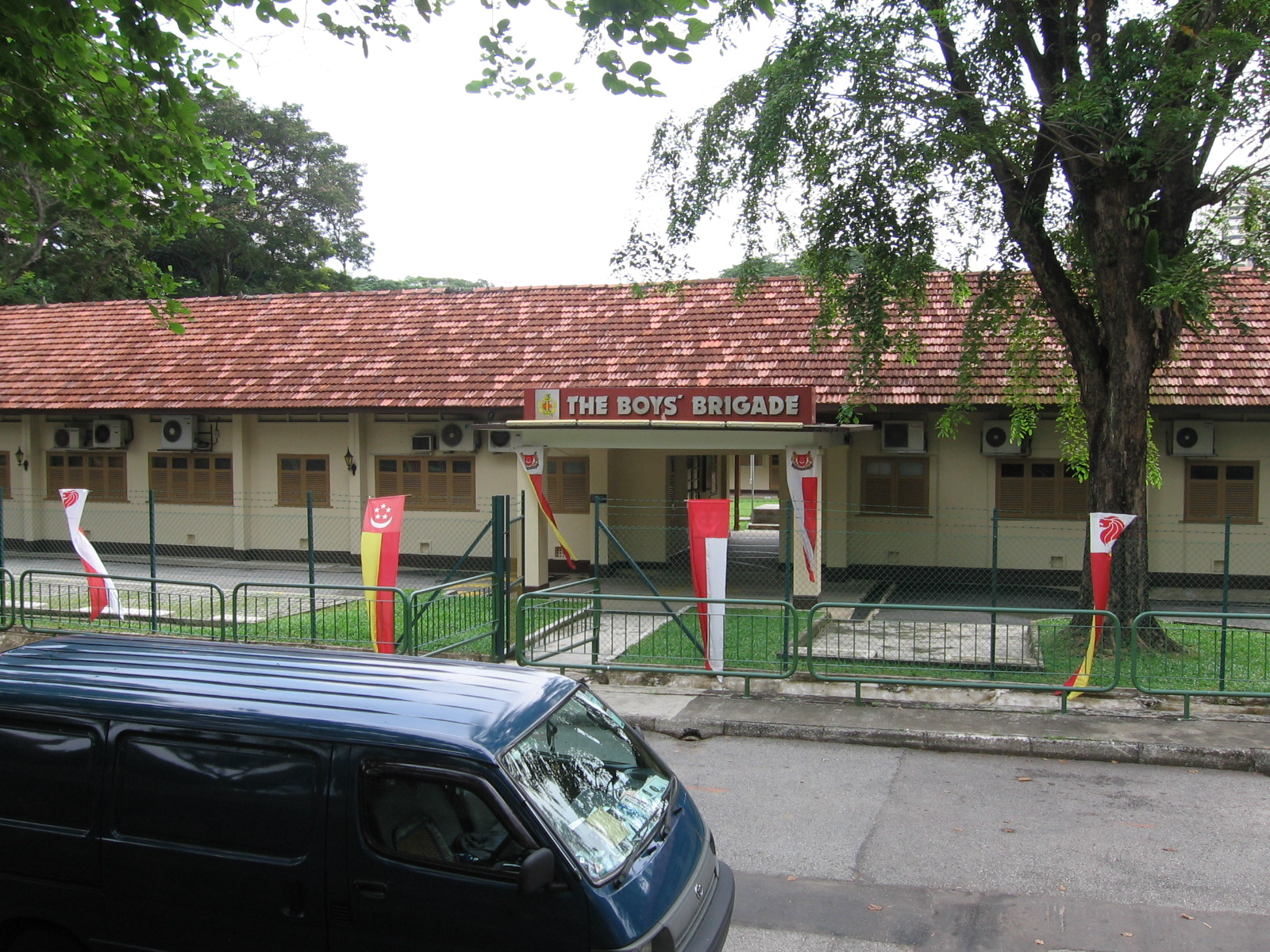
The Boys' Brigade's former Campus at 105 Ganges Avenue

The Boys' Brigade was introduced to Singapore by James Milner Fraser, an architect from Britain. He was a former member of the 23rd Aberdeen and the 23rd London Companies.

On 12 January 1930, Fraser started the 1st Singapore Company at Prinsep Street Presbyterian Church. With the aid of ex-Sergeant Quek Eng Moh of the 1st Swatow Company, he assembled 12 local Boys to form the company.

In August 1930, when the company was officially enrolled at the Boys' Brigade Headquarters in London, the membership consisted of 40 youths. The company chaplain was Reverend William Murray and Fraser's lieutenants were John McNeish (formerly of 76th Glasgow) and Dong Chui Sing. Bible class, drill, concerts, wayfaring, signalling, first aid, swimming, fencing, tumbling and other forms of physical recreation formed the core of the Boys' Brigade syllabus.

In 1931, the first camp was held at the Singapore Volunteer Camp at Siglap.

The 2nd Singapore Company was formed at Kampong Kapor Methodist Church in February 1931.

By 1936, the Singapore Battalion had 200 members. The 3rd Singapore Company was founded in 1933 at the Anglo-Chinese Continuation School. In 1934, the 5th Singapore Company was founded at Choon Guan Presbyterian Boys School, the 4th Company at Geylang Methodist Church, and the 6th Singapore at Paya Lebar Methodist Church.

The Battalion Colors were presented to the battalion by Frank Cooper Sands(former brigade chairman of the Singapore Officers' Council and later an honorary vice-president of the Battalion) in 1936 and the drill competition was introduced. Fraser served as the Battalion President from 1936 to 1956. In 1940, he handed the captaincy of the 1st Singapore Company over to one of his Boys, S. P. Chua.

During the war years of 1942 to 1945, the Brigade's activities were suspended. The Battalion destroyed its Colors to avoid destruction in the war, but some of the drums were stored in a room at Prinsep Headquarters.

After the war, S. P. Chua revived the 1st Singapore Company. By 1950, the Battalion membership had reached its pre-war membership.

On 7 May 1967, the brigade held a fundraising walk from Anglo-Chinese School to Dunearn Road, covering 9 miles (14 km). The walk was flagged off by Tan Boon Chiang, honorary president of the brigade, and about 350 boys participated.

By 1968, there were 28 companies in Singapore. In 1971, the President of the Republic of Singapore became the Battalion's Patron.

As the Brigade approached its 85th anniversary in 2015, it conducted its first Trooping of Colours parade and reunion dinner in over a decade with the then Education Minister Heng Swee Keat as the Guest-of-Honor.

In December 2023, the Brigade moved to its new Headquarters at 10 Kwong Avenue from 105 Ganges Avenue.

== Organisation ==
=== Headquarters ===
A list of honorary office-bearers include:

Position	Bearer
Patron	Mr Tharman Shanmugaratnam; President of the Republic of Singapore
Honorary President	LG (Ret) Winston Choo Wee Leong, PJG(Military), PPA(E), PPA(E) Military, PBM
Honorary Vice-presidents (Clerical)	Bishop Dr Titus Chung (Anglican); Bishop Anthony Loh (Lutheran); Bishop Philip Lim (Methodist); Rev Dr Christopher Chia (Presbyterian)
Honorary Vice-presidents (Lay)	Dr Lee Soo Ann, PBM; Mr Sam Tan Boon Yeow, PBM; Mr Peter Tay Yew Beng; Mr Peter Foo Chien Ho, PBM; Mr Choo Gim Kang; Mr Tan Kok Heng, PPA, PP, PBS; Dr Ho Yew Kee, PBS, PBM; Mr Poh Leong Berg, PPA

The Brigade Executive

The Brigade Executive is the decision-making body of The Boys Brigade. In January 2007, the Brigade implemented the Cluster Structure and grouped the BB Companies into 10 clusters with an average of 10 to 15 Companies in each cluster. These clusters are similar to the school clusters of the Ministry of Education.

Position	Bearer
Brigade President	Mr Patrick Koh Ley Boon
Vice-presidents	Mr Peter Ong Kwee Guan (Infrastructure & Projects) Dr Andrew Yong Yun Leong (Future Operations) Mr Oliver Yoke Jia Wen (Innovation & Learning) Mr Daniel Lim Wei Chong (Strategic Partnership)
Brigade Secretary	Mr Wilson Tan Teck Hian
Assistant Brigade Secretary	Mr Thaddaeus Aaron Tan Yong Zhong
Brigade Treasurer	Mr Desmond Seah Chiap Kuang
Brigade Chaplain	Rev Daniel Tong Wee Hwa
Associate Brigade Chaplain	Rev Benjamin Fong Guo Wei
Standing Committees Chairmen	Mr Alex Lum Kah Heng (Activities) Vacant (Facilities) Mr Caleb Cheong Chee Ngai (Training) Mr Gerard Su Jin Song (Juniors Programme) Mr Foo Jia Ming (Seniors Programme) Mr Kenneth Cheng Zemin (Primers Programme)
Cluster Representatives	Mr Daniel Tay Ban Hong (North 1) Vacant (North 2) Ms May Seah Yi (North 3) Mr Daryl Chen Weiming (South 1) Mr Brendan Loon Kin Yip (South 2) Mr Low Jian Xin (East 1) Mr Andy Chua Kok Hwang (East 2) Mr David Oh Tai Wai (West 1) Mr Jeshua Kok Jian En (West 2) Mr Dexter Ang Si Hao (West 3)
Executive Director	Mr Desmond Koh Yee Choy

The Brigade Office

The Brigade Office implements the strategic plans developed by the Brigade Executive.

Position	Bearer
Executive Director	Mr Desmond Koh
Deputy Executive Director	Ms Ang Hui Leng
Executive Assistant	Ms Lim Hui Min
Senior Supervisor (Finance & Admin)	Ms Rosalind Fan
Supervisor (Facilities)	Mr Steven Loh
Shop & Admin Assistant	Mr John Rey Gilo
Senior Manager (Programmes)	Mr Yam Kai Chow
Senior Executive (Seniors Programme)	Mr Lim Ting Jie
Executive (Juniors & Primers Programme)	Mr Daniel Lau
Executive (Officers Training)	Mr Paul Tan
Assistant Director (Projects)	Mr Frederick Kwan
Executive (Projects)	Vacant

=== Companies ===
Each BB Company is managed by a partnership of members from the sponsoring church and the school where the company is based, if present. They are led by the Chaplain and Captain from the church, and typically assisted by a team of Teachers-in-Charge of the school. Assisting them are Officers, Primers and other Volunteer Adult Leaders (VALs) either from the church, from other churches or as former members of the Company.

BB Companies are identified by a unique number, with an exception of Companies catered for the Primers Programme. In general, the smaller the number is, the earlier the Company was founded. For example, the 1st Singapore Company has the longest history in Singapore. While this is true for most Companies, the same cannot be said for certain Companies as the number was "recycled" (especially in the 1980s and early 1990s). The majority of the Companies are catered for the Seniors Programme. Companies with a "J" indicate the Juniors Programme. Every Company also has a sponsoring school where new boys are recruited annually, and weekly parades are held.

The BB companies in Singapore are divided into 10 Clusters – North 1, North 2, North 3, East 1, East 2, South 1, South 2, West 1, West 2 and West 3. Each Company is categorised into the appropriate Cluster based on its geographical location.

Company	Sponsoring Church	Sponsoring School	Status
1st	Prinsep Street Presbyterian Church	Yusof Ishak Secondary School	Active
1J	Prinsep Street Presbyterian Church	Pioneer Primary School	Active
2nd	Kampong Kapor Methodist Church	Victoria School	Active
4th	Faith Community Baptist Church	Whitley Secondary School	Defunct
5J	Living Praise Presbyterian Church	Kuo Chuan Presbyterian Primary School	Active
5th	Adam Road Presbyterian Church	Kuo Chuan Presbyterian Secondary School	Active
7J	Church of the Ascension	St Andrew's School (Junior)	Active
7th	Chapel of the Holy Spirit	St Andrew's School (Secondary)	Active
8J	Fairfield Methodist Church	Radin Mas Primary School	Active
9th	Church of the Good Shepherd	Westwood Secondary School	Active
10th	Toa Payoh Methodist Church	Beatty Secondary School	Active
11th	Light of Christ Church Woodlands	Christ Church Secondary School	Active
12BRJ^{A}	Barker Road Methodist Church	Anglo-Chinese School (Primary)	Active
12BR^{A}	Barker Road Methodist Church	Anglo-Chinese School (Barker Road)	Active
12J	Barker Road Methodist Church	Anglo-Chinese School (Junior)	Active
12I	Barker Road Methodist Church	Anglo-Chinese School (Independent)	Active
13th	Glory Joy Christian Church	Sembawang Secondary School	Active
14th	All Saints' Church (English Congregation)	Anglican High School	Active
16J	Good Gifts City Church	International Community School	Active
17th	Charis Methodist Church	Loyang View Secondary School	Active
19th	Yishun Christian Church (Lutheran)	Yishun Town Secondary School	Active
20J	Jesus My King Church	Greendale Primary School	Active
21J	Christalite Methodist Chapel	Geylang Methodist School (Primary)	Active
21st	Christalite Methodist Chapel	Geylang Methodist School (Secondary)	Active
22J	Ang Mo Kio Presbyterian Church	Anderson Primary School	Active
23rd	Pentecost Methodist Church	Springfield Secondary School	Active
24J	St John's – St. Margaret's Church	Fuhua Primary School	Active
25th	Faith Methodist Church	Hillgrove Secondary School	Active
27th	Ang Mo Kio Presbyterian Church	Presbyterian High School	Active
28J	New Life Baptist Church	Shuqun Primary School	Active
28th	Jurong Christian Church	Yuhua Secondary School	Active
29J	Bethesda Hall (Ang Mo Kio)	Mayflower Primary School	Active
31st	Ang Mo Kio Methodist Church	Bowen Secondary School	Active
32nd	Full Gospel Assembly	Heritage Academy @ Thomson Campus	Active
33J	Aldersgate Methodist Church	Fairfield Methodist School (Primary)	Active
33rd	Aldersgate Methodist Church	Fairfield Methodist School (Secondary)	Active
34th	Adam Road Presbyterian Church	Marsiling Secondary School	Active
35J	Fairfield Methodist Church	Zhangde Primary School	Active
36th	Church of the Epiphany (English Congregation)	Compassvale Secondary School	Active
37th	Faith Community Baptist Church	Hougang Secondary School	Active
38J	S-Word Evangelical Free Church	Keming Primary School	Active
39th	Lutheran Church of Our Redeemer	Swiss Cottage Secondary School	Active
40th	Bedok Methodist Church	Changkat Changi Secondary School	Active
41J	Faith Community Baptist Church	Tao Nan School	Active
42J	Adam Road Presbyterian Church	Nanyang Primary School	Active
44th	Woodlands Evangelical Free Church	Fuchun Secondary School	Defunct
45th	Living Sanctuary Brethren Church	Xinmin Secondary School	Active
46th	Geylang Evangelical Free Church	Junyuan Secondary School	Active
47th	Trinity Methodist Church	Serangoon Garden Secondary School	Active
48th	Bethel Presbyterian Church	Zhonghua Secondary School	Active
49J	Chapel of Christ the Redeemer	St Hilda's Primary School	Active
49th	Chapel of Christ the Redeemer	St Hilda's Secondary School	Active
50th	Fairfield Methodist Church	Gan Eng Seng School	Active
52J	St John's Chapel	Pei Tong Primary School	Active
53rd	Impact Life Church	Bukit Batok Secondary School	Active
55J	Bethesda Community	Fengshan Primary School	Active
56J	Glory Presbyterian Church (English)	Bukit Timah Primary School	Active
57J	Glory Presbyterian Church (English)	Pei Hwa Presbyterian Primary School	Active
58th	New Life Bible-Presbyterian Church	Riverside Secondary School	Active
59J	St John's Chapel	Greenridge Primary School	Active
60th	Kampong Kapor Methodist Church	Raffles Institution	Active
61st	Church of Our Saviour	Queensway Secondary School	Active
62nd	Kingdomcity Singapore	Orchid Park Secondary School	Active
64th	St John's Chapel	Ang Mo Kio Secondary School	Active
66th	Adam Road Presbyterian Church	Woodlands Secondary School	Active
67J	Church of the Good Shepherd	Queenstown Primary School	Active
68J	Bethesda Community	Valour Primary School	Active
69J	The People's Bible Church	Xinghua Primary School	Active
71J	S-Word Evangelical Free Church	South View Primary School	Active
73rd	Faith Community Baptist Church	Bukit View Secondary School	Active
74th	Mount Hermon Bible Presbyterian Church	Kent Ridge Secondary School	Active
75J	Paya Lebar Methodist Church	Punggol Primary School	Active
76J	Toa Payoh Methodist Church	First Toa Payoh Primary School	Active
77th	S-Word Evangelical Free Church	Choa Chu Kang Secondary School	Active
78J	Hebron Bible-Presbyterian Church	Yew Tee Primary School	Active
80J	Covenant Presbyterian Church	Farrer Park Primary School	Active
81J	Faith Community Baptist Church	Townsville Primary School	Active
82nd	City Harvest Church	Boon Lay Secondary School	Active
83J	Faith Sanctuary	Cedar Primary School	Active
84th	Impact Life Church	Unity Secondary School	Active
85th	Faith Community Baptist Church	Jurong West Secondary School	Active
86th	Faith Community Baptist Church	Jurongville Secondary School	Active
87th	Yishun Methodist Mission	Northbrooks Secondary School	Active
88J	Yishun Methodist Mission	Naval Base Primary School	Active
90J	Bukit Batok Presbyterian Church	Princess Elizabeth Primary School	Active
91st	Bukit Panjang Gospel Chapel	Regent Secondary School	Active
93rd	Living Sanctuary Brethren Church	Yuying Secondary School	Active
94th	True Way Presbyterian Church	Nan Hua High School	Active
95J	Westside Anglican Church	West Grove Primary School	Active
98th	True Grace Presbyterian Church	Grace Orchard School	Active
99th	Faith Community Baptist Church	Canberra Secondary School	Active
100J	Tai Seng Christian Church	North Vista Primary School	Active
102J	Tai Seng Christian Church	North View Primary School	Active
106J	St Andrew's Cathedral	Gan Eng Seng Primary School	Active
107J	S-Word Evangelical Free Church	Westwood Primary School	Active
ACJC Primers	Barker Road Methodist Church	Anglo-Chinese Junior College	Active
NP Primers	Faith Community Baptist Church	Ngee Ann Polytechnic	Active
NYP Primers	Faith Community Baptist Church	Nanyang Polytechnic	Active
SP Primers	Faith Community Baptist Church	Singapore Polytechnic	Active
FGA Primers	Full Gospel Assembly	Open Unit	Active
ITECC Primers	Full Gospel Assembly	ITE College Central	Active
ITECE Primers	Bethesda Bedok-Tampines Church	ITE College East	Active
ITECW Primers	Good Gifts City Church	ITE College West	Active
HQ Primers	-	-	Active

^{A} BR stands for "Barker Road"

== Programmes ==
There are four programmes for different age groups:

- Explorers Programme – 4 to 6 years old (Preschool, girls are eligible to enrol in this Programme)
- Juniors Programme – 8 to 12 years old (Primary 2 to Primary 6)
- Seniors Programme – 12 to 17 old (Secondary 1 to Secondary 5)
- Primers Programme – 17 to 21 years (Post-Secondary, Junior Colleges/Polytechnics/Institutes of Technical Education, girls are eligible to enrol in this Programme)

== Ranks ==
Boys
The ranks in the Seniors Programme include:

- Recruit (REC)
- Private (PTE)
- Lance Corporal (LCP)
- Corporal (CPL)
- Sergeant (SGT)
- Staff Sergeant (SSG)
- Warrant Officer (WO)

Primers
This ranks attainable by Primers include:

- Cadet Lieutenant (CLT)
- Senior Cadet Lieutenant (SCL)

Officers
This ranks attainable by Officers include:

- Officer Cadet (OCT)
- Second Lieutenant (2LT)
- Lieutenant (LTA)

== Uniforms ==
=== Juniors' Programme ===
There are three different dress codes for the Juniors' Programme for various functions and occasions. These include, in decreasing formality, the Day Dress, the Fatigue Dress and the PT Kit.

=== Seniors' Programme ===
There are five different dress codes for the Seniors' Programme for various functions and occasions. These include, in decreasing formality, the Ceremonial Dress, the Day Dress, the Musketry, the Fatigue Dress and the PT Kit.

=== Primers ===
There are four different dress codes for the Primers' Programme for various functions and occasions. These include, in decreasing formality, the Ceremonial Dress, the Day Dress, the Musketry and the Fatigue Dress.

=== Officers ===
There are six different dress codes for BB Officers for various functions and occasions. These include, in decreasing formality, the Ceremonial Dress, the Function Dress, the Day Dress, the Musketry, the Fatigue Dress and the PT Kit.

== Badges and awards ==
=== Juniors' Programme ===
Badge	Programme
JP Gold Award	Juniors
White Achievement Badge	Juniors
Green Achievement Badge	Juniors
Purple Achievement Badge	Juniors
Blue Achievement Badge	Juniors
Red Achievement Badge	Juniors
Silver Achievement Badge	Juniors
Junior One Year Service	Juniors
Junior Three Year Service	Juniors
Best Boy Award	Juniors

=== Seniors' Programme ===
Badge/Award	Type	Levels
Adventure	Core	Basic & Advance
Anti Drug Abuse (SANA)	Souvenir	Basic
Arts & Craft	Elective	Basic & Advance
Athletics	Elective	Basic & Advance
Bandsman's	Elective	Basic & Advance
Bugler's	Elective	Basic & Advance
Christian Education	Elective	Basic
Global Awareness	Core	Basic, Advance & Master
Community Spiritedness	Core	Basic, Advance & Master
Drill	Core	Basic & Advance
Drummer's	Elective	Basic & Advance
First Aid	Elective	Basic & Advance
Heritage	Souvenir	Basic
Hobbies	Elective	Basic & Advance
Kayaking	Elective	Basic & Advance
Musketry	Elective	Basic & Advance
Leadership Star	Core	Basic, Advance & Master
Piper's	Elective	Basic & Advance
Sailing	Elective	Basic & Advance
Sportsman's	Elective	Basic & Advance
Swimming	Elective	Basic & Advance
Target	Core	Basic
Juniors Programme Link	Service	N.A
Total Defence	Special	Bronze, Silver & Gold
One Year Service	Service	N.A
Three Year Service	Service	N.A
Long Year Service	Service	N.A
Founder's Award (Highest Award)	Special	N.A
Cross For Heroism	Special	N.A
Senior Proficiency Award (2nd Highest Award)	Special	N.A
Intermediary Proficiency Award (3rd Highest Award)	Special	N.A
National Event	Special	N.A
Best Boy Award	Special	N.A

=== Primers' Programme ===
Badge/Award	Type
Anchors Award	Special
Long Year Service	Service
President's Award	Special

== Community ==
The Boys' Brigade in Singapore aims to play an active role in contributing to society, and to inculcate these values to the Boys.

=== BB CARES ===
BB CARES, which stands for Community Activities Rallying Everyone to Serve involved BB companies organising activities to benefit welfare organisations of their choice. It is one of the events as part of the annual President's Challenge event.

=== Boys' Brigade Share-a-Gift ===
The Boys' Brigade Share-a-Gift (BBSG), previously known as The Boys' Brigade Sharity Gift Box, is a major annual event held during the Christmas period whereby more than 3,500 BB Officers and Boys, along with volunteers from other various groups, are mobilised to help collect gifts such as food and beverages from people and distribute these items to the needy in Singapore. These beneficiaries include the disabled, welfare homes, the elderly, and low-income families. There are also wishes from the beneficiaries that people can help to fulfill with, such as those requesting for food or household items, or toys and mattresses from children or the elderly.

Since the BBSG was started in 1988, it has been largely successful and has received great support from Singaporeans who have generously donated gifts over the years. From around 7,000 gifts collected in 1988, it has collected 428,000 gifts in 2006. Although the project did not meet its target donation by the close of the project on some occasions, the public would often continue to donate such that target was achieved within the next few weeks. In the last fifteen years, the BB has been working hand in hand with the National Council of Social Service (NCSS).

On 7 July 2013, the Boys' Brigade Share-a-Gift (BBSG) project was conferred the Singapore Youth Award Medal of Commendation. BBSG was recognised for achieving, contributing and inspiring youths at significantly higher levels after being awarded the Singapore Youth Award in 2004.

=== Boys' Brigade Learning Centre ===
The Boys' Brigade Learning Centre (BBLC) is an educational facility built and maintained by the Boys' Brigade in Proyouth Village, Puok Commune, Cambodia.

== Notable alumni ==
- Chua Siak Phuang – Last founding member of the first Boys' Brigade Company in Singapore who died in 2010.
- LG (Ret) Winston Choo – First Chief of Defence Force of the Singapore Armed Forces from 1974 to 1992 and held the rank of Lieutenant-General.
- VADM Aaron Beng Yao Cheng – 11th Chief of Defence Force of the Singapore Armed Forces.
- Andie Chen – Singaporean Actor, former BB Boy from 26th Company, Tanglin Secondary.
- Chiam See Tong – former Leader of the Opposition and Member of Parliament for Potong Pasir SMC.
- Khoo Boon Hui – former Commissioner of the Singapore Police Force.

== See also ==
- Boys' Brigade
- Boys' Brigade Learning Centre, Cambodia
