= Ng Jui Ping =

Singaporean entrepreneur and lieutenant-general (1948–2020)

- Born: 17 October 1948; Colony of Singapore
- Died: 1 January 2020 (aged 71); Singapore
- Military career
- Allegiance: Singapore
- Branch: Singapore Army
- Service years: 1964–1995
- Rank: Lieutenant-General
- Commands: Chief of Defence Force; Chief of Army; Assistant Chief of the General Staff (Personnel); Commander of 3rd Division
- Awards: See awards

Ng Jui Ping
- Simplified Chinese: 黄维彬
Transcriptions
Standard Mandarin
- Hanyu Pinyin: Huáng Wéibīn

Ng Jui Ping (17 October 1948 – 1 January 2020) was a Singaporean lieutenant-general who served as Chief of Defence Force between 1992 and 1995.

== Education ==
Ng held a Master of Arts in history from Duke University. He attended the six-week Advanced Management Program at Harvard Business School.

== Career ==
=== Military ===
Ng's career in the Singapore Armed Forces (SAF) spanned 30 years. He served as Assistant Chief of the General Staff (Personnel), Commander of 3rd Division, and Chief of Army between 1990 and 1992, and later as Chief of Defence Force between 1992 and 1995. Ng retired from the SAF in 1995.

=== Business ===
After leaving the military, Ng took up an entrepreneurial route. He co-founded Pacific Andes Resources Development Ltd and held non-executive positions within the company from 27 January 2006. He was last re-elected as a director in the company on 22 January 2010.

Ng also held non-executive or board positions in various other investment and business consulting companies, including: Oppenheimer Investments Ltd, Yanlord Land Group Ltd, Singapore Shipping Corporation Ltd, Port of Singapore Authority International (PSAI), Unisteel Technology Ltd and Global Voice Group Ltd. He leads August Asia Consulting (a consulting business) and Nanyang Institute of Management (a learning institute).

He was also an advisor to various business groups, including: Aldar, Chesterton International Property Consultants Pte Ltd, AGT International, Swiss Asia Banking School AG and MEC Coal Pte Ltd.

Between 1995 and 2003, Ng held various positions, including: deputy chairman of the Central Provident Fund Board, Singapore; chairman of Chartered Industries of Singapore Pte Ltd; corporate advisor in Singapore Technologies Pte Ltd; corporate advisor in Singapore Technologies Engineering Ltd; chairman of Singapore Technologies Automotive Ltd; chairman of Ordnance Development & Engineering of Singapore (1996) Pte Ltd.

Ng was also the vice-president of the Football Association of Singapore.

== Death ==
Ng died on 1 January 2020 at age 71 from pancreatic cancer.

== Awards ==
- Public Administration Medal (Gold), in 1991.
- Meritorious Service Medal (Military), in 1995.
- Knight Grand Cross of the Order of the Crown of Thailand (1991)
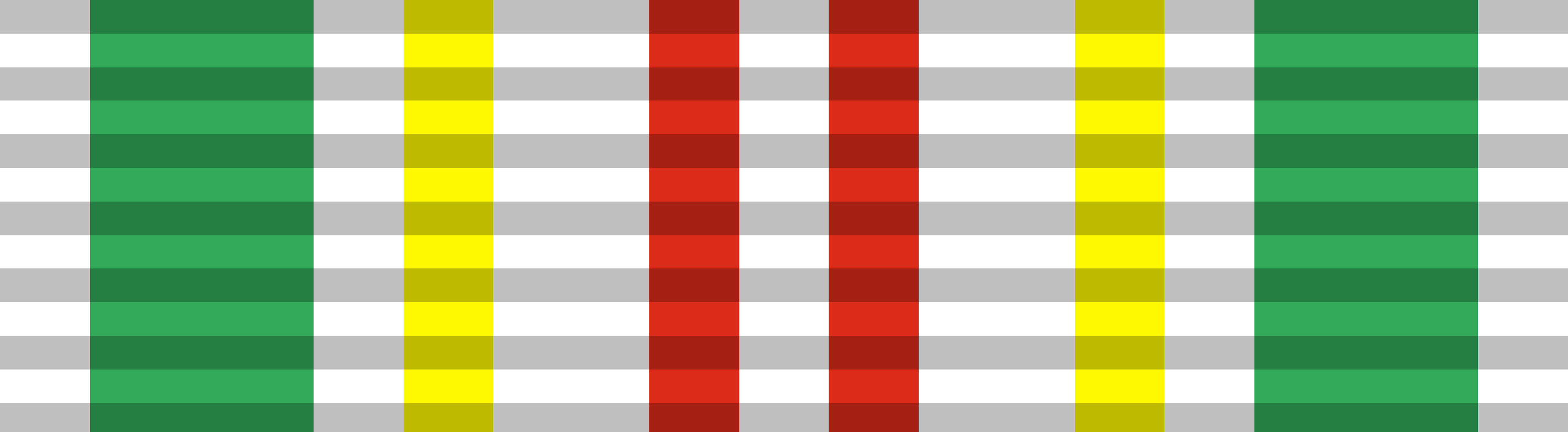
- Grand Meritorious Military Order Star, 1st Class (1994)
- Army Meritorious Service Star, 1st Class
- Order of National Security Merit, Cheonsu Medal

Military offices
Preceded by Lieutenant-General Winston Choo	2nd Chief of Defence Force; 1992 – 1 July 1995	Succeeded by Major-General Bey Soo Khiang
Preceded by Brigadier-General Boey Tak Hup	Chief of the Singapore Army; 1990 – 1992	Succeeded by Brigadier-General Lim Neo Chian
