= Chief of Defence Force (Singapore) =

Head of the Singapore Armed Forces

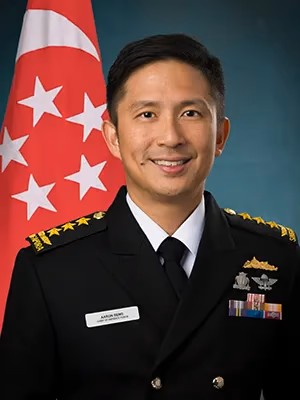
- Incumbent; Vice-Admiral Aaron Beng since 24 March 2023
- Singapore Armed Forces
- Type: Commanding general
- Abbreviation: CDF
- Reports to: Minister for Defence
- Seat: Armed Forces Council
- Nominator: Prime Minister of Singapore
- Appointer: President of Singapore
- Precursor: Chief of the General Staff
- Formation: 1974; 52 years ago (Chief of the General Staff); 1990; 36 years ago (Chief of Defence Force)
- First holder: Lieutenant-General Winston Choo

The Chief of Defence Force is the head of the Singapore Armed Forces (SAF), who holds the rank of Lieutenant-General or Vice-Admiral. The Chief of Defence Force also serves as the aide-de-camp to the president of Singapore. The current Chief of Defence Force is Aaron Beng.

The position was created in 1974 as Chief of the General Staff, before changing to its current name in May 1990. The first holder of the position was Winston Choo.

The president of Singapore has the power to appoint the Chief of Defence Force, as well as the four service chiefs in the SAF, on the advice of the prime minister, who must consult with the Armed Forces Council (AFC).

== Role ==
The CDF is the operational head of the SAF, and holds a seat on the Armed Forces Council which oversees all matters pertaining to the SAF. In addition, if any of the four service chiefs—the Chief of Army, Chief of Navy, Chief of Air Force or Chief of Digital and Intelligence Service—is unable to carry out his duties, the CDF is tasked to perform those duties in addition to his own. If the CDF is unable to perform his own duties, the Minister of Defence is allowed to select one of the four service chiefs to perform the CDF's duties.

The office of CDF also carries with it a position as one of three full-time aides-de-camp to the President. According to the Singapore Presidential Office website, the position entails handling the President's security and his/her social needs, in addition to other general duties.

A number of powers relating to summary trials for military offences is vested in the CDF. Paragraph 2, Section 62 of the Singapore Armed Forces Act states that any offence in which the accused holds the rank of Colonel or Military Expert 7 is to be referred to the CDF, who can then dismiss the charge, hold a summary trial, or pass the case on to the director of legal services of the SAF, who can in turn instruct the CDF to try the accused.

As head of the SAF, the CDF often makes visits to countries with shared military interests, such as Bahrain, Japan, and Vietnam, and also occasionally hosts foreign military chiefs on official visits.

== List of officeholders (1965–1990) ==
The role of the head of the SAF was first titled as "Director, General Staff" around 1969, and was held by Brigadier-General T. J. D. Campbell, who was previously Head of the Singapore Defence Force (1965–1966), and the Singapore Volunteer Corps (late 1950s–1965) before the independence of Singapore in 1965. Campbell had been acting director since around 1968. Colonel Kirpa Ram Vij was appointed as his successor. According to sources, the position of "Director, General Staff" was considered similar to the position of the present-day CDF, and was equivalent to Chief of Army. A news report from The Straits Times on Campbell's death refers to him as having been "army chief."

In 1974, Colonel Winston Choo was appointed Director, General Staff and promoted to the rank of Brigadier-General. Prior to his appointment, Choo served as Head of Training and Head of Organisation and Plans at the Ministry of Defence (MINDEF). The title of Director, General Staff was renamed to Chief of the General Staff in 1976, and again in May 1990, the position was renamed to Chief of Defence Force. Choo was promoted to the rank of Major-General in 1978 and subsequently Lieutenant-General in 1988, when he was Chief of the General Staff. Choo retired from the SAF in 1992, after 18 years serving as the head of the SAF.

Prime Minister Lee Kuan Yew described Goh Keng Swee as the de facto armed forces chief of staff when the latter was Minister for Defence. Goh had been responsible for evolving the SAF while serving as Minister for Defence from 1965 to 1967.

Although Campbell and Vij have both held a position of similar authority, Choo is referred to as the first CDF in a number of MINDEF publications.

In the past, the position of Deputy Chief of the General Staff existed, who was tasked to "[work] with troops on the ground," but there is no deputy position for the present-day CDF in the structure of the SAF.

Name	Office	In office	Role immediately before office	Ref
Goh Keng Swee	Minister of Defence & Security	1965–1967 (Note: As Minister for Defence, Goh has been described by Prime Minister Lee Kuan Yew as the de facto leader of the SAF.)	Minister for Finance	
Tan Teck Khim	Director, General Staff	1966–1968		
Kirpa Ram Vij	Director, General Staff	1968–1968	Director, Singapore Command and Staff College	
T. J. D. Campbell	Director, General Staff	1968–1969 (acting); 1969–1970	Principal, St. Stephen's School	
Winston Choo	Director, General Staff	1974–1976	Head of Training and Head of Organisation and Plans at the Ministry of Defence	
Winston Choo	Chief of the General Staff	1976–1990	Director, General Staff	

== List of chiefs of Defence Force (1990–present) ==
Since the creation of the CDF position in 1990, there have been 11 holders to the position, beginning with Winston Choo, who was already in office as Chief of the General Staff.

No.	Portrait	Chief of Defence Force	Took office	Left office	Time in office	Defence branch	Previous office	Later office	Ref.
1	Winston Choo	Lieutenant-General; Winston Choo (born 1941)	May 1990	30 June 1992	2 years	Army	Chief of the General Staff	Public sector (Ministry of Foreign Affairs)	
2	Ng Jui Ping	Lieutenant-General; Ng Jui Ping (1948–2020)	30 June 1992	1 July 1995	3 years, 1 day	Army	Chief of Army	Private sector	
3	Bey Soo Khiang	Lieutenant-General; Bey Soo Khiang (born 1955)	1 July 1995	1 April 2000	4 years, 275 days	Air Force	Chief of Air Force	Private sector (Singapore Airlines)	
4	Lim Chuan Poh	Lieutenant-General; Lim Chuan Poh (born 1961)	1 April 2000	1 April 2003	3 years, 0 days	Army	Chief of Army	Public sector (Ministry of Education, A*STAR)	
5	Ng Yat Chung	Lieutenant-General; Ng Yat Chung (born 1961)	1 April 2003	23 March 2007	3 years, 328 days	Army	Chief of Army	Private sector (Temasek Holdings, Neptune Orient Lines, Singapore Press Holdings)	
6	Desmond Kuek	Lieutenant-General; Desmond Kuek (born 1963)	23 March 2007	1 April 2010	3 years, 37 days	Army	Chief of Army	Public sector (Ministry of the Environment and Water Resources, SMRT Corporation)	
7	Neo Kian Hong	Lieutenant-General; Neo Kian Hong (born 1965)	1 April 2010	27 March 2013	2 years, 360 days	Army	Chief of Army	Public sector (Ministry of Education, Ministry of Defence, SMRT Corporation)	
8	Ng Chee Meng	Lieutenant-General; Ng Chee Meng (born 1968)	27 March 2013	18 August 2015	2 years, 175 days	Air Force	Chief of Air Force	Minister for Education (Schools), Second Minister for Transport, Minister in the Prime Minister's Office, and Secretary-General of the National Trades Union Congress	
9	Perry Lim	Lieutenant-General; Perry Lim (born 1972)	18 August 2015	23 March 2018	2 years, 186 days	Army	Chief of Army	Private sector (Royal Golden Eagle)	
10	Melvyn Ong	Lieutenant-General; Melvyn Ong (born 1975)	23 March 2018	24 March 2023	5 years, 1 day	Army	Chief of Army	Public sector (Ministry of Defence)	
11	Aaron Beng	Vice-Admiral; Aaron Beng (born 1981)	24 March 2023	Incumbent	3 years, 239 days	Navy	Chief of Navy	–	

In their retirement citations from the Ministry of Defence,

- Both Bey Soo Khiang and Lim Chuan Poh were cited for having "positioned the SAF to meet the challenges in the 21st century" and for improving the SAF's capacity to use latest technology in advancing the forces' proficiency;
- Ng Yat Chung's retirement citation noted that he "successfully commanded the overall deployment of the SAF in peace support operations in East Timor" and disaster relief after both the 2004 Indian Ocean earthquake and tsunami and the 2006 Yogyakarta earthquake;
- Desmond Kuek was cited for "[leading] the SAF's transformation into a modernised, integrated and networked fighting force" and "significantly [enhancing] the SAF's ability to deal effectively with the evolving security challenges".
