= Boys' Brigade Learning Centre, Cambodia =

The Boys' Brigade Learning Centre (BBLC) was established by the Boys' Brigade in Singapore as part of their community service program, to facilitate youth development in Cambodia in partnership with Cambodian schools, and to build up sufficient leadership for the Cambodian people to run their own Boys' Brigade companies. The BBLC is located at Proyouth Village, Puok Commune, near Siem Reap. Work began in 2003, and the BBLC was dedicated on 10 June 2006 by the Reverend Canon Dr. Louis Tay, the Brigade Chaplain at the time.
