= Winston Choo =

Singaporean former diplomat, civil servant and general

- Born: Winston Choo Wee Leong; 18 July 1941 (age 85); Singapore, Straits Settlements
- Allegiance: Singapore
- Branch: Singapore Army
- Service years: 1959–1992
- Rank: Lieutenant-General
- Commands: Chief of Defence Force; Chief of the General Staff; Director, General Staff; Head of Organisation and Plans, Ministry of Defence; Head of Training, Ministry of Defence; Commander, 2nd Singapore Infantry Brigade; Commanding Officer, 1st Battalion Singapore Infantry Regiment; Commanding Officer, 4th Battalion Singapore Infantry Regiment; Chief of Signals; Commanding Officer, 1st Signal Battalion
- Conflicts: Indonesia–Malaysia confrontation 1964 race riots in Singapore
- Awards: See awards
- Spouse: Katherine Seow (m. 1966)

Winston Choo Wee Leong
- Simplified Chinese: 朱维良
Transcriptions
Standard Mandarin
- Hanyu Pinyin: Zhū Wéiliáng

Winston Choo Wee Leong (Chinese: 朱维良; pinyin: Zhū Wéiliáng; born 18 July 1941) is a former Singaporean diplomat and lieutenant-general who served as Director, General Staff between 1974 and 1976, and then Chief of the General Staff between 1976 and 1990, and later Chief of Defence Force between 1990 and 1992. He was the longest-serving head of the Singapore Armed Forces (SAF).

== Early life and education ==
Born in Singapore, Choo grew up in Makepeace Road in the Newton area. He was given the name "Winston" by his grandfather, who named him after Winston Churchill.

Choo attended Monk's Hill School between 1947 and 1952, and the Anglo-Chinese School between 1953 and 1957. As a high school student, he captained the football team, played hockey, and won the Queen's Badge for his activities in the Boys' Brigade.

== Military career ==
Choo enlisted into the Singapore Military Forces (now the Singapore Armed Forces) in December 1959 and was commissioned as a second lieutenant in December 1961 after completing his officer cadet training in Sungai Besi, Malaysia. He served as a platoon commander in the 1st Battalion Singapore Infantry Regiment (1 SIR) and was involved in two major operations where he was deployed to Sebatik Island, Borneo between 1963 and 1964 during the Konfrontasi, and where he led his men in patrolling the streets during the 1964 race riots in Singapore.

After Singapore's independence from Malaysia on 9 August 1965, Choo, then the battalion signals officer, was appointed as a military aide to President Yusof Ishak. He was recalled to the SAF in 1966 and served as the first commanding officer of the 1st Signal Battalion from 1967 to 1968. From 1968 to 1969, Choo attended the Long Telecommunications Course at the School of Signals in the United Kingdom, before returning to Singapore to serve as the second-in-command of the 1st Signal Battalion. In 1970, he was appointed Chief of Communications and Electronics (now Chief Signals Officer).

In 1971, Choo briefly served as the commanding officer of the 4th Battalion Singapore Infantry Regiment (4 SIR) before attending the Command and Staff College at Fort Canning. He attended the US Army Command and General Staff course at Fort Leavenworth in Kansas, United States, that following year, and graduated with distinctions in all his subjects.

Upon his return to Singapore in September 1972, Choo assumed the command of 1 SIR. In the same year, he was named an honorary aide-de-camp to President Benjamin Sheares, and took up the command of the 2nd Singapore Infantry Brigade (2 SIB). He was also promoted to the rank of Colonel. He was later posted to the Ministry of Defence (MINDEF), where he was appointed Head of Training and Head of Organisation and Plans in 1973. In 1974, he succeeded Kirpa Ram Vij as Director, General Staff. Choo was promoted to the rank of Brigadier in 1976 and to Major-General two years later.

From 1978 to 1981, Choo attended a preparatory course in military history at the Department of History of the National University of Singapore. In 1981, he went to the United States to study for a master's degree in military history at Duke University and returned to Singapore in 1982 to resume his post as the Chief of General Staff.

Choo was promoted to the rank of Lieutenant-General in 1988 and became the first Chief of Defence Force in May 1990 after "Chief of the General Staff" was renamed. He retired from the SAF on 30 June 1992, after which he went to Harvard Business School and attended the six-week Advanced Management Program.

== Diplomatic career ==
After retiring from military service, Choo joined the Ministry of Foreign Affairs (MFA) and served as Singapore's High Commissioner to Australia and Singapore's High Commissioner to Fiji concurrently between 1994 and 1997.

He had also served as Singapore's Non-Resident High Commissioner to Papua New Guinea between 2000 and 2006 and Singapore's High Commissioner to South Africa between 2001 and 2005.

Choo was appointed Singapore's Non-Resident Ambassador to Israel in 2005, and has since been succeeded by Lim Chuan Poh who was appointed in 2021.

== Other posts ==
Apart from his military and diplomatic careers, Choo took on non-executive roles in various governmental and non-governmental organisations, including:

- Deputy Chairman, Central Provident Fund (1992–1994)
- Chairman, Chartered Industries (1992–1994)
- Board Member, Singapore Technologies (1984–1992)
- Board Member, Keppel-Tat Lee Bank (1992–2001)
- Chairman, Metro Holdings (2007–present)
- Chairman, Singapore Red Cross Society (1996–2008)
- Member, Singapore Sports Council (late 1970s)
- Member, National Youth Achievement Award Council
- Honorary President, Boys' Brigade (2011–present)

Choo has also contributed to several publications, including his recollections of Goh Keng Swee and his time in the Ministry of Foreign Affairs (MFA). He also supported the Dads for Life movement in Singapore by contributing to the book Letters from Grandpa and Grandma published in 2008.

== Personal life ==
Choo married Katherine Seow on 3 December 1966 and had two children together, Warren Choo and Karina Choo. Choo is Anglican. He attended Sunday school at Prinsep Street Presbyterian Church in his youth, before later attending St Andrew’s Cathedral and now St John’s–St Margaret’s Church.

On 8 August 2025, Reel Lumina in collaboration with production company PixelMusica premiered a documentary entitled "A Duty to Lead", with Choo sharing about the values that have guided his life and leadership.

== Works ==
- "A Special Relationship that Continues to Grow" in Beating the Odds Together: 50 Years of Singapore-Israel Ties. Ed. Mattia Tomba. Singapore: World Scientific Book, 2019 . ISBN 978-981-121-468-4 OCLC 1122747159
- "A Soldier at Heart : A Memoir" Singapore : Landmark Books Pte Ltd, 2021. ISBN 9789811811715

== Awards ==
Throughout his career, Choo won many accolades, some of the medals were displayed at a National Library Board exhibition in 2006. The following is a partial list of his medals:

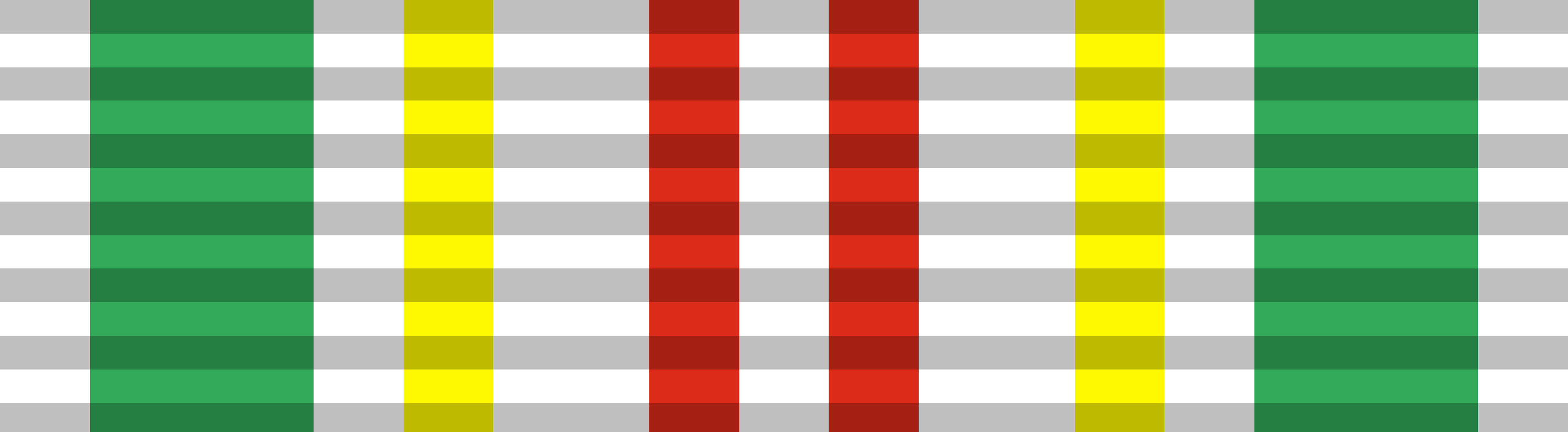

Country	Ribbon	Description	Notes
National honours
Singapore		Darjah Utama Bakti Cemerlang (Distinguished Service Order)	Awarded in 2015.
Singapore		Bintang Bakti Masyarakat (Public Service Star)	Awarded in 2009 for his work with the Ministry of Foreign Affairs.
Singapore		Pingat Bakti Masyarakat (Public Service Medal)	Awarded in 2005 for his work with the Singapore Red Cross Society in tsunami relief operations.
Singapore		Pingat Pentadbiran Awam, Emas (Public Administration Medal, Gold)	Awarded in 1978.
Singapore		Meritorious Service Medal (Military)	Awarded in 1990 for exceptional distinguished service in military command or staff work.
Singapore		Public Administration Medal (Gold) (Military)	Awarded in 1981.
Singapore		Pingat Bakti Setia (Long Service Medal)	
Singapore		Singapore Armed Forces Long Service and Good Conduct (20 Years) Medal	
Singapore		Singapore Armed Forces Long Service and Good Conduct (10 Years) Medal	With 15-year clasp.
Singapore		Singapore Armed Forces Good Service Medal	
Singapore		Pingat Pertahanan (The Defence Medal)	
Foreign honours
Malaysia		Darjah Yang Mulia Setia Mahkota Malaysia (Commander of the Order of Loyalty to the Crown of Malaysia)	
Malaysia		Darjah Panglima Gagah Angkatan Tentera (Honorary Malaysian Armed Forces Order for Valour (First Degree))	Awarded in 1987.
Malaysia		Pingat Perkhidmatan Anggota Beruniform Malaysia (The Uniformed Service Malaysia Medal)	
Thailand		Knight Grand Cross of the Order of the White Elephant	
Thailand		Knight Grand Cross of the Order of the Crown of Thailand	
United States		Commander of the Legion of Merit	Awarded in 1978.
Indonesia		Bintang Yudha Dharma Utama (1st Class)	Awarded in 1986.
Brunei		The Most Exalted Order of Paduka Keberanian Laila Terbilang (1st Class)	
Taiwan		Grand Cordon of the Order of the Cloud and Banner	
Philippines		Grand Commander of the Legion of Honor	
France		Commander of the Legion of Honour	
South Korea		Order of National Security Merit, Tongil Medal	

Military offices
New title	1st Chief of Defence Force; 1974–1992	Succeeded by Major-General Ng Jui Ping
