= Saw Phaik Hwa =

Singaporean businesswoman

Saw Phaik Hwa (simplified Chinese: 苏碧华; traditional Chinese: 蘇碧華; pinyin: Sū Bìhuá; born 1957 in Kuala Lumpur, Malaysia) is a Malaysia-born Singapore corporate executive. She was the president and chief executive officer of the SMRT Corporation from December 2002 to 6 January 2012. Prior to that, she had 19 years of experience at DFS Venture Singapore (Pte) Ltd.

== Education ==
Saw received an honours degree in biochemistry from the University of Singapore.

== Career ==
=== DFS Ventures ===
From 1984 to 2002, Saw served as Regional President for DFS Venture Singapore (Pte) Ltd. She left the company in 2002 as a result of budget cuts.

=== SMRT Corporation ===
In 2002, Saw became the President of SMRT.

In December 2011, Saw resigned as the president of SMRT in the midst of public anger over two train breakdowns that caused commuters to be stranded. These breakdowns were the worst since the transit system was started in 1987.

On 6 January 2012, Saw resigned as a director of SMRT, following which former Army General Desmond Kuek was appointed as the President and Group Chief Executive Officer.

=== Auric Pacific ===
On 1 May 2012, Saw was appointed to be the CEO of Auric Pacific, specializing in Delifrance, Sunshine and Topone, including the best-selling Food Junction. She retired from this post effective 30 April 2015.

=== Singapore Jian Chuan Tai Chi Physical Culture Association ===
Since at least 2017, Saw is the president of the Singapore Jian Chuan Tai Chi Physical Culture Association, a tai chi school.

== Criticism ==
During her tenure as head of SMRT, Saw was accused of under-investing in maintenance of trains and tracks. This led to a culmination of train breakdowns, especially in 2015, causing delays to hundreds of thousands of commuters.
