= Han Eng Juan =

Singaporean former army general

Han Eng Juan PPA(E) PPA(P) PP PBS
- Born: 1955 (age 70–71); Colony of Singapore
- Allegiance: Singapore
- Branch: Singapore Army
- Service years: 1973–1998
- Rank: Major-General
- Awards: See awards and decorations

Chinese name
- Traditional Chinese: 韓瑛元
- Simplified Chinese: 韩瑛元
Transcriptions
Standard Mandarin
- Hanyu Pinyin: Hán Yīngyuán
- IPA: [xǎn.íŋ.ɥɛ̌n]

Han Eng Juan (Note: Chinese: see Chinese name and romanisations) PPA(E) PPA(P) PP PBS is a Singaporean former civil servant and former major-general who served as Chief of Army from 1995 to 1998.

Upon leaving army in June 1998, Han was appointed as the chief executive officer of the Land Transport Authority till July 2003.

== Education ==
Han was awarded a Singapore Armed Forces Overseas Scholarship in 1973 and graduated with a Master of Science.

== Military career ==
In 1973, Han enlisted in the SAF, and served as a armour officer in the Singapore Army. During his career in the army, Han held various commands such as Head, Training Development Branch; Commanding Officer, 46 Singapore Armoured Regiment; Commander, Singapore Armoured Brigade; Chief Armour Officer, Commander, 3rd Division; Assistant Chief of General Staff (Personnel), Assistant Chief of General Staff (Training) and Chief of Staff (General Staff).

Han was promoted from the rank of major to lieutenant-colonel in 1984 and to the rank of brigadier-general in 1993.

On 1 May 1995, Han succeeded Lim Neo Chian as the Chief of Army. Under his leadership, the operational readiness of the army was enhanced, through the acquisition and production of the BIONIX AFV and upgrading of the Ultra M113. Land exercises between Singapore and Malaysia were also upgraded in scale to accommodate a more realistic training for both armies. In 1995, Han led the first SAF delegation to Vietnam, aimed to build mutual understanding and cooperation between both countries and the region, and in 1997, he officiated the first bilateral exercise between armies from Singapore and Thailand.

On 1 July 1996, Han was promoted from the rank of brigadier-general to major-general.

During his term in the military, Han also served as a board member of the Mass Rapid Transit Corporation and the Economic Development Board.

On 30 June 1998, Han left the military and was succeeded by Lim Chuan Poh.

== Post-military career ==
After leaving the army, Han joined the Land Transport Authority as its chief executive officer.

On 28 August 1998, when the Electronic Road Pricing (ERP) was still in its testing phase, 1,562 motorists were charged erroneously, ranging from S$0.5 to S$3. Han apologised for the error, and announced that a S$10 CashCard will be sent to all motorists involved as a goodwill gesture. During his charge, new road pricing areas were implemented and changes to the ERP timing and charges were adjusted according to prevalent traffic and road usage.

On 15 July 2003, Han retired from the public service.

== Personal life ==
Han is married with two children.

== Awards and decorations ==
- Public Administration Medal (Military) (Gold), in 1996.
- Public Administration Medal (Military) (Silver), in 1988.
- Commendation Medal (Military) (Gold), in 1983.
- Long Service Medal, in 1998.
- Singapore Armed Forces Long Service and Good Conduct (20 Years) Medal
- Singapore Armed Forces Long Service and Good Conduct (10 Years) Medal
- Singapore Armed Forces Good Service Medal

== Notes ==
Military offices
Preceded by Major-General Lim Neo Chian	Chief of the Singapore Army; 1 May 1995 – 30 June 1998	Succeeded by Brigadier-General Lim Chuan Poh
