= Volunteer Special Constabulary =

Volunteer police force of Singapore

The Volunteer Special Constabulary (VSC) in Singapore comprises volunteers from the general public. VSC officers are imbued with equal powers of a regular police officer to enforce law and order in Singapore. They wear the same police uniform as police officers as they patrol the streets and participate in public outreach events.

Previously headquartered at the Eu Tong Sen Street Police Station and Toa Payoh Police Station, in 2000 the VSC headquarters relocated to the new Police Cantonment Complex.

== History ==
The VSC was formed in 1946 to augment the slender ranks of police regulars immediately after the war, when manpower was badly needed to restore law and order. About 150 men responded to appeals made in the press and formed the pioneer batch of the VSC. The VSC has since grown and contributed significantly in maintaining law and order in Singapore.

The first test for VSC was during the Maria Hertogh riots in 1950, when VSC Officers performed duties alongside the regular forces in suppressing riots. Other achievements include the arrest of a communist arsonist, the arrest of a terrorist suspected of grenade attacks in Bras Basah Road and the quelling of the Hock Lee bus riots in 1955. One VSC officer, Special Constable Andrew Teo Bock Lan, was fatally injured during the Hock Lee bus riots.

Part-time National Service was introduced in 1967. The total force of the Special Constabulary, including volunteers and national servicemen, was 10,000 by 1977. The National Servicemen were required to serve 12 years on a part-time basis. Up to 70% of them were deployed for patrol duties in the divisional police stations, in the marine police, radio and traffic divisions. A small number was attached to the Reserve Unit to help in anti-rioting and crowd control. The VSC was renamed SC(V) (or Special Constabulary (Volunteer)), and SC(NS) (or Special Constabulary (National Service)) to reflect the two groups of special constables. Part-time Special Constabulary National Service was discontinued in 1981, and the SC(V) reverted to the VSC.

== Organisation and Manpower ==
The strength of VSC currently stands at approximately 1,400 officers. At the apex of the VSC structure is the VSC Commander, Assistant Commissioner (AC) Shng Yunn Chinn who assumed command in March 2020. The Commander is assisted by his Deputy Commander (a VSC Officer) and the Heads of respective divisions and units. The VSC organisation structure was recently reorganised to fall in line with the overall structure of the Singapore Police Force to complement the regular force in as many policing areas as possible.

VSC Recruitment

The VSC holds periodical outdoor recruitment drives to attract new blood. Applicants must meet certain basic physical and academic requirements, or can be former Police National Servicemen or ex-regular officers in the Singapore Police Force. Requirements include: age between 18–45 years old, a minimum of 5 GCE-"O" level passes, basic proficiency in English, Singapore citizenship or permanent residency, as well as minimum weight and height requirements. Male recruits must be of PES A or B in medical status.

VSC Training

VSC recruits undergo basic non-residential training at the Home Team Academy. The Basic Course is conducted twice a week on weekday evenings for a duration of 26 weeks. It imparts volunteers with basic police skills, basic legal knowledge, street craft, firearms training, drill and T-baton training and defensive tactics. They will be required to pass prescribed examinations at the end of each stage of the training. Upon completion of their basic training, VSC officers have opportunities to attend developmental and advanced courses conducted by Tracom. Such courses cover subjects such as leadership/management, police operations and tactics.

Posting and Deployment

Upon graduating from their Basic Course with the rank of Sergeant 1 (SGT 1(V)), VSC officers are posted to one of the seven Police Land Divisions, or Specialised Units - Airport Police, Police Coast Guard, Traffic Police, Central Narcotics Bureau, Public Transport Security Command (TRANSCOM) and Training Command (TRACOM) - where they will work with regular police officers. In the past, VSC officers were also posted to the "KV" troop of the Police Task Force, part of the Police Special Operations Command (SOC), for anti-crime policing as well as anti-rioting and crowd control duties; but the troop was disbanded at the end of 2001 in a reorganisation of the SOC in the aftermath of the Sep 11 terrorist attacks on the US; and its 100-odd officers were transferred to other police divisions or units. Most VSC officers posted to land divisions take on the role of a GRF (Ground Response Force) officer - and respond to 999 calls together with the regular counterparts. It is virtually impossible to tell a VSC officer apart from a regular officer from the uniform or equipment because volunteers are dressed and equipped in the same way as regulars. Like their regular counterparts, VSC officers who pass their annual classification test shoot and Police Defensive Tactics test will be equipped with the standard-issued revolver and T-baton respectively, to be used as required when performing their police duties.

Terms of Service

VSC Officers may remain active in service as long as they are medically fit. VSC officers may remain in service up to the age of 55 years regardless of rank. Extension of service till 60 years of age may be granted provided the officer meets the requisites for extension. VSC officers holding the rank of Station Inspector and below must put in at least 16 hours of voluntary work in the police force every month, while officers holding the rank of Inspector and above need to perform a minimum of 24 hours of voluntary service per month.

Rewards and Recognition

Like most other volunteer organizations, members are rewarded by a sense of satisfaction and purpose, instead of in monetary terms. VSC officers are not "paid" for their duty hours, but an allowance of SGD 5.20 is claimable per hour of administrative or operational duty regardless of rank (to cover transportation, laundry and meal expenses). Like the regulars and NS men, cash incentives are given for shooting and physical fitness: VSC officers are eligible for a SGD 200 award if they earn a marksmanship score in their annual revolver test shoot, and SGD 100/200 award for obtaining the Silver/Gold standard in their annual Individual physical proficiency test (IPPT). VSC officers are also eligible for commendations and service medals awarded to their regular counterparts, such as the Police Good Service Medal, and the Police Long Service and Good Conduct Medal. From 2012, VSC officers are awarded the Pingat Bakti Setia (Polis) for 25 years of continuous service in SPF.

== Equipment ==
VSC officers wear the same standard blue uniforms as the officers of the Singapore Police Force. They are provided the same walkies-talkies, Steel Extendable Baton and Taurus Model 85 firearms as their standard police officer, in order to complement their abilities to support the Singapore Police Force in maintaining law and order in Singapore.

== Honorary VSC (School) Scheme ==
In 1997, the Honorary VSC (School) Scheme was started to train school teachers (usually the discipline masters or operation managers) as police officers. By 2007, 267 volunteer cops from 144 secondary schools in Singapore have been appointed Hon VSCs under this scheme. These teachers don the rank of Inspector or above. However, unlike VSCs, Hon VSCs do not perform police duties with regular officers, but confine their anti-crime activities to their own schools. Such activities may include investigations into bullying cases, advising students against committing crimes and liaising with regular police officers at the Neighbourhood Police Centers. Unlike regular VSCs who are volunteers, Hon VSCs in Schools are appointed to carry out their responsibilities as part of their teaching or operations manager professions and do not perform police duties outside of their place of work in the schools.

== VSC (Community) Scheme ==
In 2018, the Singapore Police Force launched a new scheme that officers will undergo a shorter training duration of seven weeks and be required to perform at least eight hours of patrol duty a month. The new VSC (Community) officers will now be deployed to various neighbourhood police posts in all six police divisions to carry out patrols alongside regular police officers. Unlike regular police and VSC officers, the VSC (Community) officers do not carry firearms, but will still have arrest powers and carry batons, handcuffs and communication sets. These officers wear a uniform made up of a blue polo T-shirt and black cargo pants. VSC(C) officers serve until 60 years old.

== See also ==
- Civil Defence Auxiliary Unit
- Home Team Volunteers Network
- Police Volunteer Reserve Corp (Malaysia) The Malaysian Counterpart
- SAF Volunteer Corps
