= T. J. D. Campbell =

Singaporean Army officer

- Born: 6 April 1922
- Died: 20 October 1989 (aged 67); Kelmscott, Western Australia, Australia
- Military career
- Allegiance: British Empire; Singapore
- Branch: Singapore Armed Forces; Singapore Volunteer Corps
- Service years: 1940–1970
- Rank: Brigadier-General
- Commands: Director, General Staff (1968–1970); Head, People's Defence Force (1965–1968); Head, 1st Singapore Volunteer Corps (late 1950s–1965)
- Conflicts: World War II

Thomas James Duncan Campbell (6 April 1922 – 20 October 1989) was a Singaporean brigadier-general who served as Director, General Staff between 1968 and 1979.

== Early life ==
Campbell was born on 6 April 1922 in Australia to Percival Joachim Duncan Campbell and Inez Vivienne Ramage Miles.

== Military career ==
Campell served in the Singapore Volunteer Corps during World War II, and was commissioned into active service in 1950.

Campell was one of the first leaders of the Singapore Army, having held the equidistant command of Chief of the Singapore Volunteer Corps from the late 1950s to 1965 and later Chief of the People's Defence Force from 1965 to 1970.

== Principal of St. Stephen's School ==
T. J. D. Campell served as the principal of Saint Stephen's School, a primary school in Singapore, from 1961 to 1966, and again from 1971 to 1973.

== Personal life ==
Campbell retired in 1970 and moved to Australia and lived in Kelmscott in Western Australia.

He was married and has a son and a daughter.

Military offices
| Preceded by Goh Keng Swee as Minister of Defence | 2nd Director, General Staff of Defence Force; 1968-1970 | Succeeded by Kirpa Ram Vij |
