= Straits Settlements Volunteer Force =

- Active: 1922–1942; 1948–1954
- Country: Straits Settlements
- Branch: Volunteer Reserves
- Type: Reserve rifle infantry
- Role: Infantry
- Size: 4 battalions
- Part of: Malaya Command
- Garrison/HQ: Singapore
- Engagements: World War II: Malayan campaign; Battle of Penang 1941; Battle of Singapore

The Straits Settlements Volunteer Force (SSVF) was a military reserve force in the Straits Settlements, while they were under British rule. While the majority of the personnel were from Singapore, some lived in other parts of the Settlements, including Penang, Province Wellesley, Malacca and Labuan.

== History ==
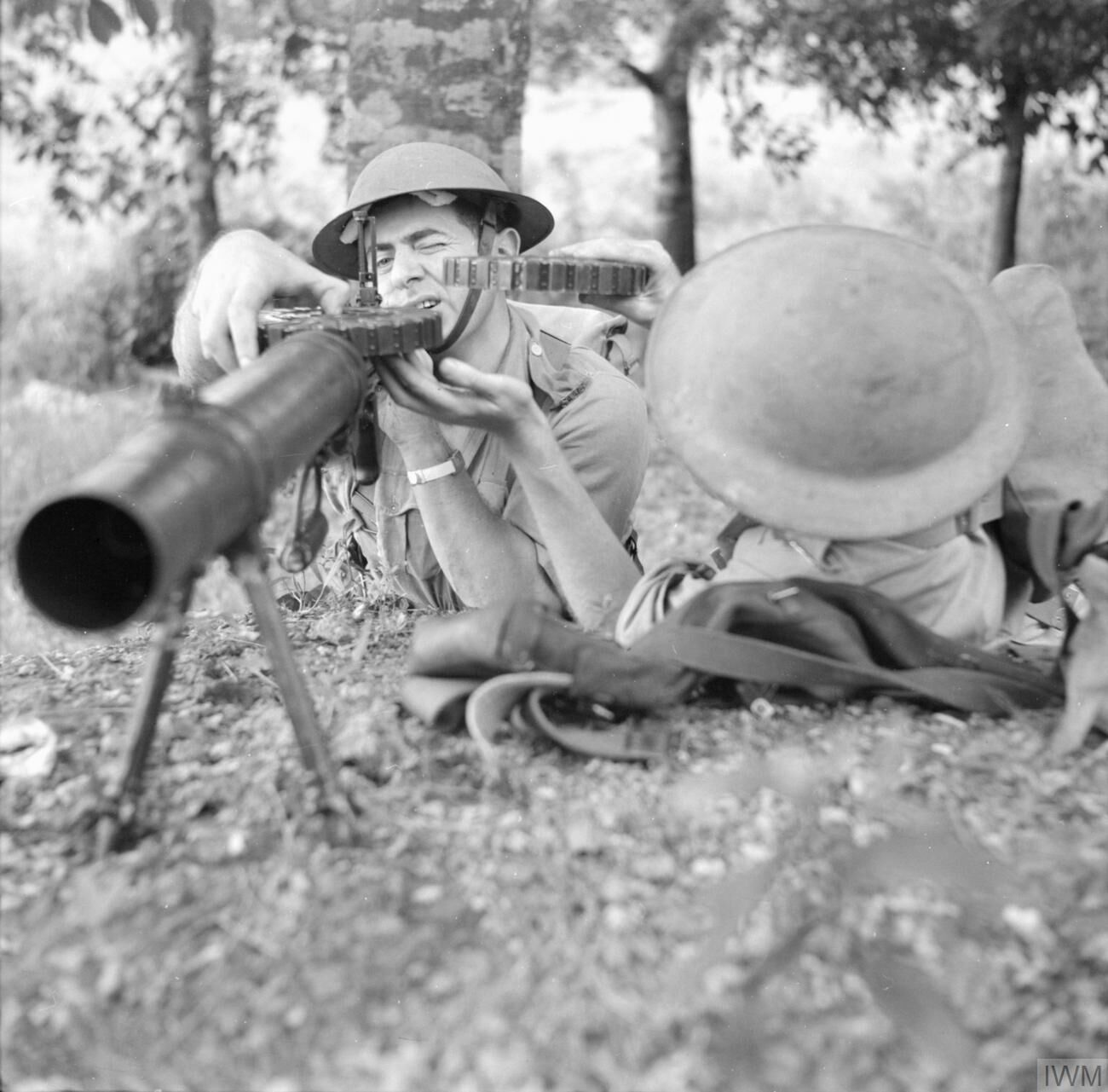
Volunteer troops training with a Lewis machine gun, November 1941

The SSVF had its origins in the Singapore Volunteer Rifle Corps (SVRC), formed in 1854. The SVRC was disbanded in 1887 and an artillery corps named, the Singapore Volunteer Artillery Corps (SVA) was formed in 1888. In 1915 it helped suppress the mutiny of Sepoys in Singapore. The SSVF was officially formed in 1922, following the amalgamation of the Singapore Volunteer Corps, Penang and Province Wellesley Volunteer Corps, Malacca Volunteer Corps, and Labuan Volunteer Defence Detachment. In 1928, the SSVF infantry was re-organised into 4 battalions. The 1st and 2nd battalions consisted of members of the Singapore Volunteer Corps (1,250 men), the 3rd battalion consisted of the Penang & Province Wellesley Volunteer Corps (916 men) and the 4th Battalion consisted of the Malacca Volunteer Corps (675 men). Besides the infantry, the rest of the SSVF consisted of the Singapore Royal Artillery, Singapore Royal Engineers, Singapore Armoured Car Company and 3 ambulance units.

=== World War II ===
As international tensions heightened during the 1930s, an increasing number of men of the various nationalities in the Settlements — predominantly European, Malay, Chinese, Indian and Eurasian — joined the SSVF. It included naval, air force, special operations, irregular units (such as Dalforce) and home guard units. The SSVF — including four infantry battalions — took part in the Battle of Singapore in 1942, and most of its members were captured on 15 February 1942 when their positions were overrun. The SSVF was reconstituted in 1948. In 1954, the Singapore Volunteer Corps was absorbed into the Singapore Military Forces when the SSVF was disbanded.

== Formation ==
By World War II, there were four infantry battalions under SSVF. The battalions were :

Units under Straits Settlements Volunteer Force
Battalion	Unit's crest	Unit's Name	Headquarters	Strength
1st Battalion SSVF		Singapore Volunteer Corps	Beach Road, Singapore	1,250 men
2nd Battalion SSVF		Singapore Volunteer Corps	Beach Road, Singapore	1,250 men
3rd Battalion SSVF		Penang and Province Wellesley Volunteer Corps	George Town, Penang	916 men
4th Battalion SSVF		Malacca Volunteer Corps	Malacca	675 men

== See also ==
- Battle of Malaya
- Battle of Singapore
- SAF Volunteer Corps (SAFVC)
