= Home Team Volunteers Network =

Home Team Volunteer Network
- Founded: 15 July 2011
- Founder: Ministry of Home Affairs (Singapore)
- Type: Government
- Purpose: Law Enforcement, Civil Defense, Rehabilitation (penology) and Advisory board
- Location: HomeTeamNS-JOM @ Balestier at 31 Ah Hood Road, Level 3, Singapore 329979
- Region served: Singapore
- Owner: Ministry of Home Affairs (Singapore)
- Key people: Ho Peng Kee; Permanent Secretary (Home Affairs); Heads of Home Team Departments
- Employees: ~10
- Volunteers: 16,000
- Website: www.htv.gov.sg

The Home Team Volunteer Network (HTVN) is a volunteer organisation in Singapore.

It was launched by Deputy Prime Minister and Minister for Home Affairs, Teo Chee Hean, at the Home Team Convention on 15 July 2011. The Network is an entity that promotes the implementation of volunteer management best practices for the benefit of Home Team volunteers and is also the key channel through which the Ministry of Home Affairs engages its volunteers. The HTVN comes under the ambit of the Ministry of Home Affairs and does not raise funds from the public for whatever purposes.

== The Steering Committee ==
The Steering Committee of the HTVN is an advisory body on Home Team volunteer matters.

The Steering Committee is appointed by the Minister for Home Affairs for a 2-year term or as otherwise specified, and comprises both Home Team key appointment holders as well as existing Home Team volunteers.

== Home Team Volunteer Schemes ==
Home Team Volunteers broadly refer to people who volunteer in a volunteer scheme within the Ministry of Home Affairs.

Home Team Volunteers are classified by the Ministry under two broad categories. They either serve as members of its Boards, Councils and Committees, known also as the Home Team Connection, or as volunteers within one of its departments. The departments that currently have volunteers are the Singapore Police Force, the Singapore Civil Defence Force, the Singapore Prison Service and the Singapore Corporation of Rehabilitative Enterprises, otherwise known as SCORE. Strictly speaking however, it is worth noting that SCORE is not a department but a Statutory Board under the Ministry of Home Affairs.

== See also ==
- Volunteer Special Constabulary
- Civil Defence Auxiliary Unit
- Yellow Ribbon Project
