= Ng Yat Chung =

Singaporean business executive and former general

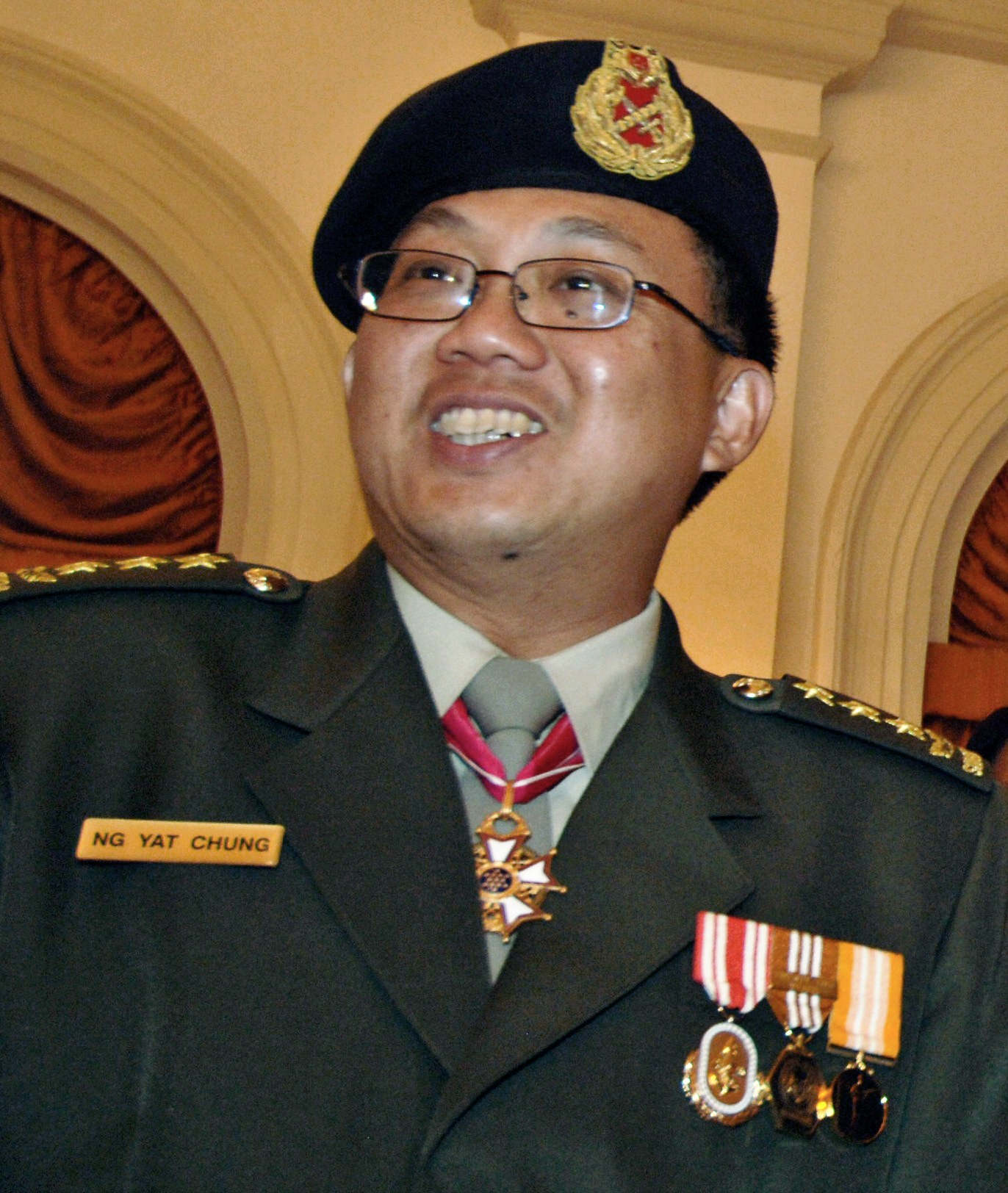
- Ng in 2005
- Born: 1961 (age 64–65); State of Singapore
- Allegiance: Singapore
- Branch: Singapore Army
- Service years: 1979–2007
- Rank: Lieutenant-General
- Commands: Chief of Defence Force; Chief of Army; Chief of Staff – Joint Staff; Director, Joint Operations and Planning Directorate; Commander, 3rd Division; Head, Joint Operations Department; Commander, 3rd Singapore Infantry Brigade; Assistant Chief of the General Staff (Plans); Commanding Officer, 21st Battalion Singapore Artillery
- Awards: See awards
- Education: Christ's College, Cambridge; Stanford University; United States Army Command and General Staff College

Chinese name
- Chinese: 伍逸松
Transcriptions
Standard Mandarin
- Hanyu Pinyin: Wǔ Yìsōng

Ng Yat Chung is a Singaporean former lieutenant-general who served as Chief of Defence Force between 2003 and 2007.

== Education ==
Ng received his secondary and pre-university education in Victoria School and Hwa Chong Junior College respectively. He received the Singapore Armed Forces Overseas Scholarship for his undergraduate studies in 1980, and graduated in 1983 with a Bachelor of Arts (Honours) in engineering from Christ's College, Cambridge. After applying for an Oxbridge Master of Arts, in 1987 his BA was converted into an MA (not an earned master's degree). He also holds a Master of Business Administration from Stanford University. He attended the six-week Advanced Management Program at Harvard Business School, and graduated with a Master of Military Art and Science from the United States Army Command and General Staff College.

== Military career ==
Ng enlisted in the Singapore Armed Forces (SAF) in 1979 and was commissioned as an artillery officer in December that year. Throughout his military career, he held various appointments, including the following: Commanding Officer, 21st Battalion Singapore Artillery; Assistant Chief of the General Staff (Plans); Commander, 3rd Singapore Infantry Brigade; Head, Joint Operations Department; Commander, 3rd Division; Director, Joint Operations and Planning Directorate; Chief of Staff (Joint Staff); Chief of Army. He relinquished his appointment as the Chief of Army on 1 April 2003 and succeeded Lim Chuan Poh as the Chief of Defence Force (CDF).

As the CDF, Ng laid the blueprint for the 3rd Generation SAF by overseeing the development of new operational concepts to further integrate the Army, Navy and Air Force. He also commanded the SAF's humanitarian assistance and disaster relief response in Aceh and Phuket after the 2004 Indian Ocean earthquake and tsunami, as well as similar missions to Yogyakarta and Phitsanulok in 2006. He retired from the SAF on 23 March 2007 and was succeeded by Desmond Kuek as the CDF.

== Business career ==
=== Temasek Holdings (2007–2011) ===
After leaving the military, Ng joined Temasek Holdings and was rotated in the company: Head of Energy & Resources; Co-Head of Australia & New Zealand & Co-Head of Strategy; Senior managing director.

=== Neptune Orient Lines (2011–2017) ===
Ng joined the board of Neptune Orient Lines (NOL) as an Executive Director in May 2011 and was appointed Group President and Chief Executive Officer in October.

On 9 June 2016, it was announced that Temasek would tender its NOL shares to CMA. Ng cited NOL's lack of scale as the primary reason for its sale. He subsequently received criticism for his failure to improve the company's performance over his years as CEO. On 19 May 2017, Reuters reported that CMA managed to turn NOL around, with NOL posting a $26 million net profit for Q1 2017. After the sale, Ng stayed on as Special Advisor from June 2016 to May 2017.

=== Singapore Press Holdings (2017 – 2022) ===
On 20 July 2016, Ng was appointed as an independent director of Singapore Press Holdings. On 1 September 2017, Ng was appointed CEO of SPH following his predecessor, Alan Chan's, retirement. On 12 October 2017, Ng announced a retrenchment exercise. Under his leadership, SPH's revenue had fallen from S$1,032 million in 2017 to S$865 million in 2020. In 2020, due to the confluence of factors such as the COVID-19 pandemic and the decline of print advertising, SPH recorded its first-ever loss of S$11.4 million.

At a press conference held on 6 May 2021, Ng and other SPH leaders announced that the company's media businesses, including major Singaporean broadsheets like The Straits Times and Lianhe Zaobao, would be spun off into a separate company limited by guarantee, operating as a not-for-profit entity. This move would remove shareholders' pressure on the media unit to perform and be profitable. Ng took offence when a CNA Digital reporter asked whether restructuring SPH's media businesses meant that the company would pivot to prioritising editorial integrity over advertising interests. Ng's use of the word "umbrage" gained significant attention, with the word becoming the top searched term on Google in Singapore that day, spawning memes, parody advertisements, and merchandise. Ng subsequently apologised for any offence that might have been caused by his comment.

After SPH delisted from the Singapore Exchange on the 13 May 2022, Ng, along with the directors serving alongside him, stepped down from his post on the 16 May 2022. Ng was succeeded by Gerald Yong, former CapitaLand CEO (Special Projects).

== Awards ==
- Public Administration Medal (Gold) (Military), in 1998.
- Knight Grand Cross (1st Class) of The Most Noble Order of the Crown of Thailand, in 2002.
- Knight Grand Cross (1st Class) of The Most Exalted Order of the White Elephant, Thailand, in 2005.
- The Most Exalted Order of Paduka Keberanian Laila Terbilang (1st Class), Brunei, in 2005.
- Bintang Yudha Dharma Utama (Grand Meritorious Military Order, Indonesia), in 2005.
- Darjah Panglima Gagah Angkatan Tentera (Honorary Malaysian Armed Forces Order for Valour (First Degree)), in 2005.
- Long Service Medal (Military), in 2007.
- Meritorious Service Medal (Military), in 2007.
- Outstanding Service Award, by the National University of Singapore in 2013.
- Grand Cordon of the Order of the Resplendent Banner (3rd Class), China, Republic of
- Legion of Merit (Degree of Commander), United States of America
- Grand Cordon of the Order of the Precious Tripod, China, Republic of

Military offices
Preceded by Lieutenant-General Lim Chuan Poh	5th Chief of Defence Force; 1 April 2003 – 23 March 2007	Succeeded by Major-General Desmond Kuek
Preceded by Major-General Lim Chuan Poh	Chief of the Singapore Army; 1 April 2000 – 1 April 2003	Succeeded by Brigadier-General Desmond Kuek
