= James Milner Fraser =

Scottish architect

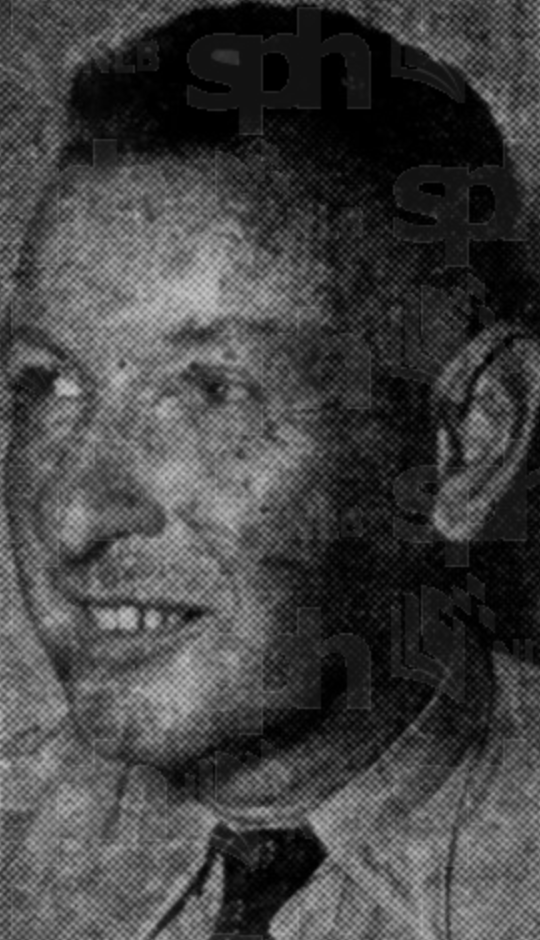
James Milner Fraser

James Milner Fraser (5 January 1905 — 30 November 1978) was a Scottish architect who served as the manager of the Singapore Improvement Trust from the mid-1940s to 1956. He was also a founder of the Boys' Brigade in Singapore.

== Early life and education ==
Fraser was born in Aberdeenshire, Scotland on 5 January 1905 to ironmonger James Milner Fraser and his wife Elizabeth Ann Davidson. He attended the Kittybrewster Preparatory School and the Aberdeen Grammar School. In June 1920, he was apprenticed to James Cobban, who ceased practice in September 1923. He was then apprenticed to George Watt, and he completed his apprenticeship under Watt in June 1925. During this period, he attended the Aberdeen School of Architecture, where Alexander Gordon was among his tutors.

== Career ==
Following the end of his apprenticeship, Fraser moved to London and became a junior assistant at the Housing Department of the London County Council. He also attended the Regent Street Polytechnic and the Northern Polytechnic. In 1926, he made a study tour of Rome, Florence and Paris. In the same year, he became an assistant architect of the West Ham Borough Council.

In 1927, Fraser moved to Singapore and was employed at the Municipal Offices of the Singapore Improvement Trust under Gordon. In August 1928, he passed the final exam and was admitted Associate of the Royal Institute of British Architects. In 1930, he established the 1st Singapore Company of the Boys' Brigade at the Prinsep Street Presbyterian Church. He was made the manager of the Singapore Improvement Trust in the mid-1940s and supervised the development of over 10,000 houses, shops and flats. He also wrote several papers and reports on town planning and housing issues. In 1949, he spent six months in the United Kingdom studying various housing schemes and town planning methods. He was awarded the CBE in 1955. In the same year, he was also made a Fellow of the Royal Institute of British Architects. He acted as the chairman of the Singapore Improvement Trust until his retirement in 1958.

== Personal life and death ==
Fraser married Alice Ross on 31 December 1928. They had a son, also named James Milner Fraser.

He retired to Scotland and died in Cults, Aberdeen on 30 November 1978.
