= Desmond Kuek =

Former Chief of Defence Force of Singapore

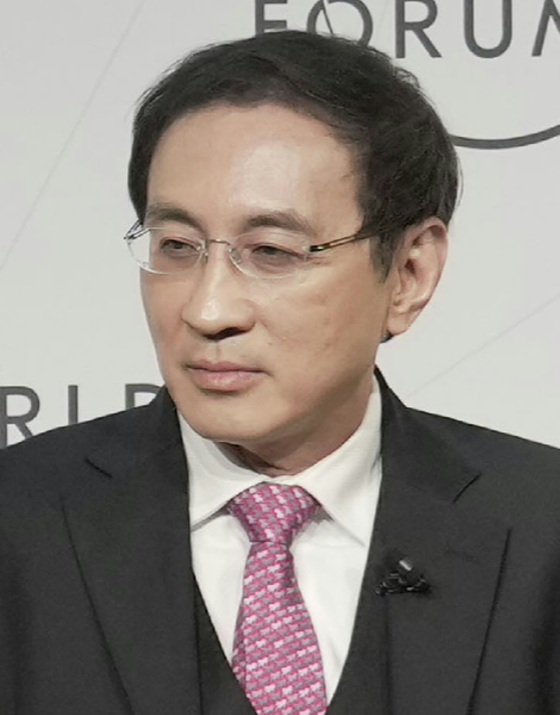
- Kuek in 2023
- Born: 28 August 1963 (age 62); State of Singapore
- Allegiance: Singapore
- Branch: Singapore Army
- Service years: 1981–2010
- Rank: Lieutenant-General
- Commands: Chief of Defence Force; Chief of Army; Chief of Staff – General Staff; Director, Joint Intelligence Directorate; Commander, 3rd Division; Assistant Chief of the General Staff (Operations); Commander, 4th Singapore Armoured Brigade; Head of Defence Studies Department, Ministry of Defence; Commanding Officer, 41st Battalion Singapore Armoured Regiment
- Awards: See awards
- Education: University of Oxford (MA); Harvard University (MPA)
- Spouse: Claudel Kuek

Desmond Kuek Bak Chye
- Simplified Chinese: 郭木财
Transcriptions
Standard Mandarin
- Hanyu Pinyin: Guō Mùcái
Southern Min
- Hokkien POJ: Kueh Ba̍k-tsâi

Desmond Kuek Bak Chye is a Singaporean former lieutenant-general who served as Chief of Defence Force between 2007 and 2010.

After leaving the Singapore Armed Forces (SAF), Kuek had served as Permanent Secretary for Environment and Water Resource between 2010 and 2012, and the president and chief executive officer of the SMRT Corporation between 2012 and 2018.

He moved on to join UBS AG as Divisional Vice Chairman in Global Wealth Management and headed their Sustainable Finance office. He is presently CEO of Temasek Trust.

== Education ==
Kuek was educated at the Anglo-Chinese School and Anglo-Chinese Junior College, before he was awarded the Singapore Armed Forces Overseas Scholarship in 1982 to study at the University of Oxford, where he graduated with a Master of Arts degree in engineering science.

He subsequently went on to complete a Master of Public Administration degree in macroeconomics and statistics at Harvard University.

== Military career ==
Kuek enlisted in the Singapore Armed Forces (SAF) in 1981. He attended the Infantry Officer Basic Course in Fort Benning, USA and was awarded the Distinguished Allied Leadership Graduate in 1985. He was the top student at the Army's Company Tactics Course in 1987 and Battalion Tactics Course in 1989, held in SAFTI, Singapore. He also attended the Command and Staff Course at Camberley Staff College in the United Kingdom in 1991. He rose rapidly through the ranks, receiving the following appointments:

1. Commanding Officer, 41st Battalion Singapore Armoured Regiment;
2. Head of Defence Studies Department, Ministry of Defence;
3. Commander, 4th Singapore Armoured Brigade;
4. Assistant Chief of the General Staff (Operations);
5. Commander, 3rd Division;
6. Chief of Staff, General Staff;
7. Director, Joint Intelligence Directorate;

In 2003, Kuek succeeded Ng Yat Chung as Chief of Army. On 23 March 2007, Kuek succeeded Ng again but as the Chief of Defence Force (CDF).

Kuek relinquished his appointment as the CDF on 31 March 2010 and was succeeded by Neo Kian Hong.

== Civil Service career ==
After leaving the military, Kuek served as a Permanent Secretary in the Ministry of the Environment and Water Resources from 1 July 2010 to 30 September 2012. During his tenure, he co-chaired the Environment and Water Technologies (Clean Water) Executive Committee and the Steering Committee on CleanTech Park.

== Business career ==
=== SMRT Corporation Limited (2012–2018) ===
On 1 October 2012, Kuek was appointed President and Group CEO of SMRT Corporation, a transport company providing rail, bus, and taxi services.

As group CEO, he was also responsible for taking the company private by selling it to Temasek Holdings on 29 September 2016.

Kuek led SMRT's rail transformation effort to renew and improve the ageing North-South and East-West Lines (NSEWL), Singapore's oldest, longest and most heavily-used MRT lines. The multi-year, multi-project renewal effort spearheaded by Singapore's Land Transport Authority (LTA) involves six major components and will stretch into the early 2020s:

1. Sleeper replacement: 188,000 wooden sleepers were replaced with concrete sleepers.
2. Power rail replacement: Some 200 km of Third Rails (Power Rails) and insulators were renewed.
3. Re-signalling project: The legacy Westinghouse fixed-block system (used since the late 1980s) was replaced by a communications-based train control system supplied by Thales.
4. Power supply system renewal
5. Track circuit replacement
6. Introduction of new trains

Working in partnership with LTA, three of the six projects were completed under Kuek's watch. These are the projects to renew the sleepers and power rails, and the re-signalling effort. A project with Otis Elevator Company to renew NSEWL escalators throughout the network began in August 2016 and is expected to be completed in the early 2020s.

In his review of Kuek's tenure, the Straits Times Senior Transport Correspondent Christopher Tan noted that Kuek led SMRT "during what was probably its most tumultuous period".

Tan wrote: "But even though his tenure was marred by incidents such as track deaths and tunnel flooding, he was part of the team – along with SMRT Trains chief Lee Ling Wee – which rebuilt the reliability of the North-South and East-West lines. As of the end of March this year, the North-South Line clocked an average of 604,000 train-km before a delay lasting more than five minutes; for the East-West Line, the figure was 272,000 train-km. These were some 10 times better than the lines' performance in 2011. The number of major breakdowns – those lasting more than 30 minutes – on Singapore's two oldest lines has also decreased to just one in the first quarter. At their worst, the two lines chalked up nearly one such breakdown each month. The Circle Line, which is likewise operated by SMRT, also posted a tenfold improvement in reliability over the same period to 1.8 million train-km between delays."

=== Genium & Co (2018 to 2022) ===
On 24 November 2018, the Straits Times reported that Kuek had founded a leadership consultancy called Genium & Co. The company is helmed by two former SAF officers, Fred Tan and Ang Yau Choon, who serve as managing directors. Tan headed the Singapore Armed Forces' Centre for Leadership Development while Ang served as commander of the SAF Commando Training Institute. Genium's principal activities are in organisational transformation, strategy execution, crisis leadership, experiential learning and performance excellence.

=== UBS (2019 to 2022) ===
Kuek joined Swiss investment bank UBS on 18 February 2019 as its Singapore-based divisional vice-chairman for global wealth management. UBS announced Kuek's appointment in a statement issued on 4 February 2019.

At UBS, he was concurrent Global Head of the Sustainable Finance Group, which is a commercially focused, cross-divisional group that supports the implementation of sustainability and impact strategy relating to sustainable finance across the firm. Kuek also chaired the UBS Optimus Foundation and directed the management of the UBS’ Singapore Program for Employability and Resilience (SUPER).

=== Temasek Trust (2023 to present) ===
In September 2022, The Straits Times reported that Kuek would join Temasek Trust, the philanthropic arm of Singapore's state-owned investment company, Temasek, as its executive director and chief executive officer from January 2023.

=== Miscellaneous ===
He was a member of the Centre for Strategic Futures Advisory Board and the Advisory Group for Civil Service Governance & Leadership (Human Resource). He sat on the Civil Service College Board and chaired its audit committee. In addition, Kuek was also a member of the Advisory Board at SAP Asia Pacific & Japan, Engineering College Advisory Board at Nanyang Technological University, and International Advisory Committee at the Lee Kuan Yew Centre for Innovative Cities at Singapore University of Technology and Design (SUTD).

Kuek also held directorships on the boards of the following companies: Housing and Development Board, from 2001 to 2003; International Enterprise Singapore, in 2005; JTC Corporation, from 2007 to 2010; Defence Science and Technology Agency, from 2007 to 2010; ST Engineering and its various subsidiaries, from 1994 to 2010.

== Awards ==
- Singapore :
  - 2002 - Public Administration Medal (Military) (Gold)
  - 2009 - Meritorious Service Medal (Military)
- Thailand :
  - 2005 - Knight Grand Cross of the Order of the Crown of Thailand
  - 2008 - Knight Grand Cross of the Order of the White Elephant
- Indonesia :
  - 2006 - Army Meritorious Service Star, First Class
  - 2009 - Grand Meritorious Military Order Star, First Class
- Brunei :
  - 2007 - Order of Paduka Keberanian Laila Terbilang, First Class
- Malaysia :
  - 2008 - Courageous Commander of The Most Gallant Order of Military Service
- France :
  - 2008 - Commander of the Legion of Honour
- Taiwan :
  - 2009 - Order of the Cloud and Banner with Grand Cordon
- USA :
  - 2010 - Commander of the Legion of Merit

Government offices
Preceded by Ms. Saw Phaik Hwa	Chief of SMRT Corporation; 1 Oct 2012 – 31 Jul 2018	Succeeded by Mr. Neo Kian Hong
Preceded by Lieutenant-General Ng Yat Chung	6th Chief of Defence Force; 23 Mar 2007 – 31 Mar 2010	Succeeded by Major-General Neo Kian Hong
Preceded by Major-General Ng Yat Chung	Chief of the Singapore Army; 1 April 2003 – 20 March 2007	Succeeded by Brigadier-General Neo Kian Hong
