= Civil Defence Auxiliary Unit =

Part of the Singapore Civil Defence Force

The Civil Defence Auxiliary Unit (CDAU) is part of the Singapore Civil Defence Force (SCDF) consisting of uniformed volunteers.

The volunteering programme in SCDF was first started in 1982 under the National Civil Defence Plan and Volunteer Scheme which provided an avenue through which residents can volunteer their service in civil defence roles within their local community. However, these volunteer residents were not expected to perform duties to the level that of a professional SCDF officer.

== History ==
In response to the increased threat of terrorism following the September 11, 2001 attacks in New York City, there was a growing need to enhance the civil defence capability of the country. In addition, SCDF realised that in the wake of a crisis such as severe acute respiratory syndrome, Nicoll Highway collapse, 2004 Indian Ocean earthquake and tsunami, large scale manpower is required for sustained deployment, which will be taxing on its standard regulars. Mobilisation of NS men is not feasible due to the impact on economic activity and is deemed too heavy a response.

As a result, a new form of volunteer organisation, the Civil Defence Auxiliary Unit, was created to provide an immediate pool of ready personnel. Modelled from the Singapore Police Force’s Volunteer Special Constabulary (VSC) scheme of service, members of the CDAU are given the same status and authority as regular SCDF officers. They are expected to perform frontline operational duties alongside regulars. As volunteers, CDAU officers are paid an allowance instead of wages.

In April 2006, the Civil Defence Auxiliary Unit (CDAU) was officially launched to provide an avenue for the public to volunteer their service with the Singapore Civil Defence Force (SCDF). CDAU comprises volunteers from all walks of life, from professionals to blue-collar executives to even undergraduates, bonded with the same aspiration to serve the nation by complementing the Singapore Civil Defence Force. Donning SCDF uniforms and possessing the same status and powers as SCDF regulars, CDAU officers perform frontline duties alongside regular officers in the areas of fire-fighting & rescue, emergency ambulance service, community involvement, public education. Professionals with expertise in specialised areas such as Fire Safety, Info-Communications, Chemistry, Life Sciences and Chemical Engineering may enter directly into the Senior Officer scheme.

In late 2010, 3 more CDAU vocations were created, which are Enforcement Officer, Heritage Gallery Guide, and Search Dog Handler. In future, CDAU Officers may also be participating in national events such as NDP, F1, etc., to supplement the regular force. Since 2015, the CDAU scheme has been extended to those without prior firefighting experience for both males and females. These fresh volunteers must complete a 16-week non-residential firefighting course conducted after office hours at the Civil Defence Academy. Upon graduation, these volunteer firefighters are awarded the fire badge identical to regulars. The first batch graduated in late 2015, becoming the first volunteer firefighters in SCDF history. CDAU celebrated its 10th anniversary in 2016.

== Recruitment ==
Since its inception, the target is to reach a pool of about 500 CDAU Officers within 5 years. SCDF holds periodical recruitment via SCDF web portal to attract new candidates. Applicants must meet certain basic physical and academic requirements or can be former SCDF Servicemen. Basic requirements include: 18 years old & above, secondary education. Singapore citizenship or permanent residency, as well as minimum weight and height requirements. Male recruits must have completed full-time NS. Applicants are offered direct entry into any of the 7 vocations.

1. Fire Fighting & Rescue
2. Emergency Medical Services
3. Public Education & Community Involvement
4. Expertise Group
5. Enforcement Officer
6. Heritage Gallery Guide
7. Search Dog Handler (defunct)
8. Ops Centre Specialist

== Training ==
Depending on the type of service, non-residentical training is conducted at the Civil Defence Academy (CDA) located at Jalan Bahar or at the Division HQ after office hours or weekends. Upon successful completion of training, CDAU officers will be deployed to the respective Division HQ or Fire Stations.

== Service & Deployment ==
CDAU is not an independent unit but placed subordinate to the different line units. Senior Officers (Lieutenant & Above) and Junior Officers (Senior Warrant Officer & Below) serve at least 24 and 16 hours respectively per month. They are required to serve a minimum of 2 hours per duty. Former SCDF regulars and national servicemen are given their last-held rank subject to approval. Those who are not previously served in SCDF will start with the corporal rank. Like the regulars and NS men, CDAU officers are rewarded similarly for their respective IPPT results. CDAU officers are also eligible for commendations and service medals awarded to their regular counterparts. With effect from November 2016, the hourly allowance increase from $3.60 to $4.60 meant to offset out-of-pocket expenses such as transport and food. As a result of the home team unified rank structure and scheme started in July 2016, new CDAU officers will start off as SGT 1 from July 2017 onwards. Most of the existing CDAU officers holding corporal rank will be emplaced to SGT 1 similarly.

CDAU officers can remain active in service as long as he is medically fit, up to the age of 50 for junior officers or 55 for Senior Officers. As CDAU follows SCDF rank structure, auxiliary officers must meet the stringent requirement as their regular counterparts to be eligible for career progression. Similarly to their regular counterpart, CDAUs must clear their annual IPPTs and other mandatory tests required for the respective vocations. Duty in CDAU are not counted as part of reservist liability. CDAU members are also trained in SG Secure initiatives from 2016 onwards.

== Attire ==
Auxiliary officers are issued with either the working or field dress, similar to that of ordinary SCDF officers, to suit their working conditions. Auxiliary officers uses identical equipment with their regular counterparts. CDAU Officers are distinguish by an identification badge pinned on the top right breast pocket to differentiate them from regular and NS personnel.

== Others ==
CDAU should not be confused with Community Emergency Response Team (CERTs) as the latter is a non-uniformed organisation under People's Association and is only limited to support in its own community with lesser duty obligation. When the Committee to Strengthen National Service (CSNS) report is released in May 2014, CDAU was mentioned. Following that, CDAU was quoted on several media included Minister of Defence speech in Parliament seating.

== In popular culture ==
Fictional Television programs

- Fiery Passion (烈焰焚情 Liè Yàn Fén Qíng), 12 February 1992
- On the Frontline (穿梭生死线 Chuān Suō Shēng Sǐ Xiàn), 2000
- Life Line, 2005
- Without Warning 26 October 2006
- Life Line 2, 15 May 2007
- Rescue 995, 06 Feb 2012
- In Safe Hands, 07 Mar 2022

== See also ==
- Ministry of Home Affairs (Singapore)
- Home Team Volunteers Network
- National Civil Defence Cadet Corps
- Volunteer fire department
- SAF Volunteer Corps
- Volunteer Special Constabulary
