= Lim Neo Chian =

Chief of the Singapore Army (1992-1995)

- Allegiance: Singapore
- Branch: Singapore Army
- Service years: ?–1995
- Rank: Major-General
- Commands: Chief of Army (1992–1995)
- Awards: See awards

Chinese name
- Traditional Chinese: 林梁長
- Simplified Chinese: 林梁长
- Hanyu Pinyin: Lín Liángcháng
- IPA: [lǐn.ljǎŋ.ʈʂʰǎŋ]

Lim Neo Chian is a Singaporean former major-general who served as Chief of Army between 1992 and 1995.

After leaving the Singapore Army, he has held both executive and non-executive positions in various organisations, including the Jurong Town Corporation, Economic Development Board, ST Engineering, Singapore Tourism Board and the Singapore Cruise Centre.

== Education ==
Lim graduated from the University of Sheffield in 1975 with a Bachelor of Engineering degree. He attended the Program for Management Development and the six-week Advanced Management Program in Harvard Business School in 1988 and 2002 respectively. He received an Honorary Doctorate in engineering from the University of Sheffield in 1996.

== Career ==
Lim served in the Singapore Armed Forces (SAF) and was the Chief of Army from 1992–1995. He held the rank of Major-General. After retiring from the SAF in 1995, Lim held both executive and non-executive positions in various organisations, including: Jurong Town Corporation, as its chief executive officer from 1995–1998; China-Singapore Suzhou Industrial Park Development, as its chief executive officer from 1 March 1998 to 31 December 2000; Bangalore IT Park Board, as the chairman of its executive committee from 1995–1998; Economic Development Board, as its deputy chairman from 1998–2001; ST Engineering, as its chief executive officer from June 2001 to February 2002; Singapore Tourism Board, as its deputy chairman and chief executive officer; SCP Consultants, as its chairman; Singapore Red Cross Society, as its vice chairman until 2011; French-Singapore Business Council, as its co-chairman; Ascendas Hospitality Trust, as its chairman and an independent director; Gardens by the Bay, as its deputy chairman; Singapore Cruise Centre, as its director; Economic Development Innovations Singapore, as its director.

== Awards ==
Lim received the Public Administration Medal (Military) (Gold) in 1993. He was also awarded the Public Administration Medal (Gold) in 2003 for his handling of Singapore's tourism sector during the SARS outbreak that year.

== Personal life ==
Lim is married and has three children.

Military offices
Preceded by Major-General Ng Jui Ping	Chief of the Singapore Army; 1992–1995	Succeeded by Brigadier-General Han Eng Juan
