= Neo Kian Hong =

Singaporean civil servant

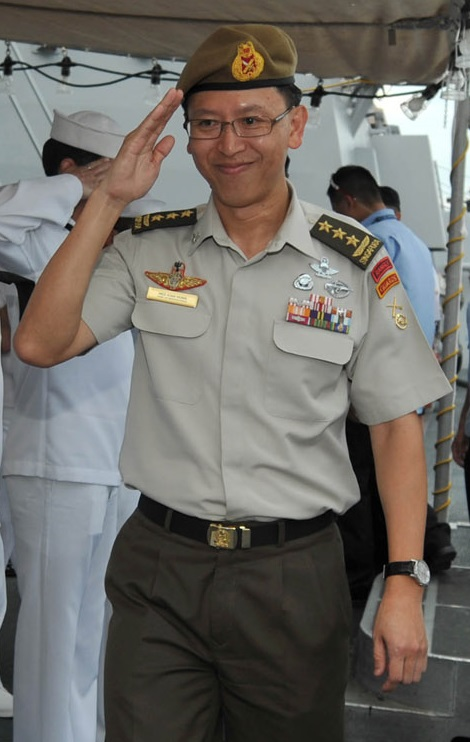
- Neo in 2011
- Born: 1965 (age 60–61); Singapore
- Allegiance: Singapore
- Branch: Singapore Army
- Service years: 1983–2013
- Rank: Lieutenant-General
- Commands: Chief of Defence Force; Chief of Army; Chief of Staff – Joint Staff; Assistant Chief of the General Staff (Operations); Commander, Army Training and Doctrine Command; Commanding Officer, 1st Battalion Singapore Guards
- Awards: See awards
- Education: King's College London; MIT Sloan School of Management; Harvard Business School

Neo Kian Hong
- Simplified Chinese: 梁建鸿
Transcriptions
Standard Mandarin
- Hanyu Pinyin: Liáng Jiànhóng

Neo Kian Hong is a Singaporean civil servant and former lieutenant-general who served as Chief of Defence Force between 2010 and 2013.

Neo served as the chief executive officer of SMRT Corporation between 2018 and 2022. Prior to that, he had served as Permanent Secretary (Defence Development) in the Ministry of Defence (MINDEF) and Permanent Secretary (Education Development) in the Ministry of Education (MOE) after leaving the Singapore Armed Forces (SAF).

== Education ==
Neo received his secondary education in Victoria School, where he was also a National Cadet Corps cadet, After his pre-university education in Nanyang Junior College, he was awarded the Singapore Armed Forces Overseas Scholarship in 1985 and graduated with a Bachelor of Engineering (Upper Second Class Honours) degree in electrical and electronic engineering from King's College London. He subsequently completed a Master of Science degree in management of technology from the MIT Sloan School of Management. He attended Advanced Management Program at Harvard Business School in 2013.

== Military career ==
Neo joined the Singapore Armed Forces (SAF) in 1983. Throughout his 30-year service in the SAF, he held various appointments, including: Commanding Officer, 1st Battalion Singapore Guards; Commander, Army Training and Doctrine Command, Assistant Chief of the General Staff (Operations); Chief of Staff, Joint Staff; Chief of Army (2007–2010). He served as the SAF's contingent commander for the International Force for East Timor (INTERFET) in 1999 and as the Director of Operations, Ministry of Health, during the 2003 severe acute respiratory syndrome (SARS) outbreak, he was involved in establishing the national contact and tracing system in Singapore.

In 2010, Neo was appointed as the SAF's Chief of Defence Force (CDF) and was promoted from the rank of Major-General to Lieutenant-General.

Neo was succeeded by Ng Chee Meng in 2013 when he retired that year.

== Civil career ==
After leaving the SAF, Neo joined the civil service and was appointed as the Permanent Secretary (Education Development) in the Ministry of Education (MOE) on 1 July 2013. In MOE, he was part of senior management who helped to formulate and implement education policies, and to oversee the development and management of schools. In particular, he contributed to the development of MOE's Outdoor Education Masterplan and Digital Plan to build resilient mind, body and cohesion amongst students. It includes the building and upgrading of outdoor adventure centres for MOE to accommodate cohort camps at three levels: P5, S1 and S3. The Digital Plan improves the way students learn by using technology and further develops communication between parents and schools.

Neo was appointed as Permanent Secretary (Defence Development) in the Ministry of Defence in 2017. In this role, his portfolio covers defence research and technology, capability development and acquisitions, and defence administration.

== Business career ==
On 1 August 2018, Neo joined SMRT as the Group Chief Executive Officer (CEO). On 1 July 2022, he resigned from his position and will stay on as an advisor till 31 October 2022. On 1 August 2022, Ngien Hoon Ping will succeed him as the next Group CEO.

== Awards and decorations ==
- Meritorious Service Medal (Military) - PJG, in 2012.
- Public Administration Medal, (Gold) (Military) - PPA(E), in 2007.
- Public Administration Medal, (Silver) (Bar) (Military) - PPA(P)(L)
- Long Service Medal (Military), in 2008.
- Singapore Armed Forces Long Service and Good Conduct (10 Years) Medal with 15 year clasp
- Singapore Armed Forces Good Service Medal
- Singapore Armed Forces Overseas Service Medal
- International Force East Timor Medal
- Order of the Cloud and Banner (雲麾勳章) with Yellow Grand Cordon (黃色大綬)
- The Most Exalted Order of Paduka Keberanian Laila Terbilang (1st Class)
- Bintang Kartika Eka Paksi Utama (1st Class), Indonesia (2009)
- Knight Grand Cross of the Order of the White Elephant, Thailand
- Knight Grand Cross of the Order of the Crown, Thailand
- Darjah Panglima Gagah Angkatan Tentera (Honorary Malaysian Armed Forces Order for Valour (First Degree), in October 2011.
- Bintang Yudha Dharma Utama (1st Class)
- US Legion Of Merit (Commander)
- Master Parachutist Badge
- Basic Diving Badge
- Combat Skills Badge (CSB)
- Thailand Airborne Badge
- Thailand Ranger Badge
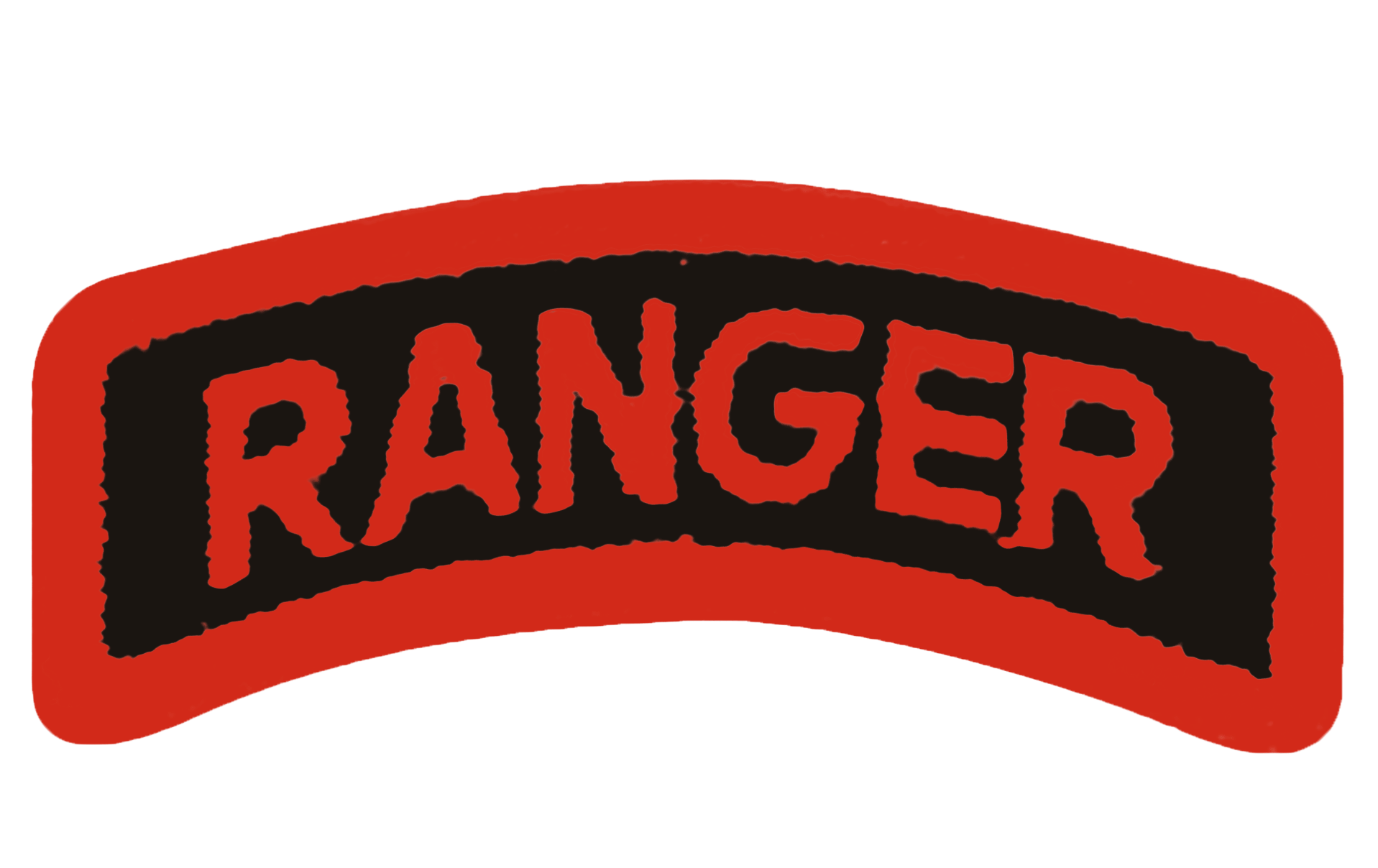
- Ranger Tab
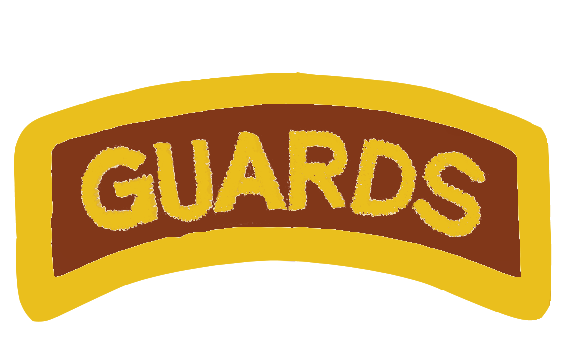
- Guards Tab

Government offices
Preceded by Mr. Desmond Kuek	Group CEO of SMRT Corporation from 1 August 2018	Incumbent
Preceded by Lieutenant-General Desmond Kuek	7th Chief of Defence Force; 31 March 2010 – 26 March 2013	Succeeded by Major-General Ng Chee Meng
Preceded by Major-General Desmond Kuek	Chief of the Singapore Army; 20 March 2007 – 26 March 2010	Succeeded by Brigadier-General Chan Chun Sing
