= Lim Chuan Poh =

Singaporean diplomat

Singapore Ambassador to Israel
- In office 19 January 2021 – 31 October 2023

Personal details
- Born: 1961 (age 64–65) Singapore
- Education: St John’s College, Cambridge; Cornell University
- Awards: See awards

Military service
- Allegiance: Singapore
- Branch/service: Singapore Army
- Years of service: 1979–2003
- Rank: Lieutenant-General
- Commands: Chief of Defence Force; Chief of Army; Chief of Staff, General Staff; Head, Joint Plans Department; Commander, 9th Division; Commander, 10th Singapore Infantry Brigade; Commanding Officer, 3rd Singapore Infantry Regiment

Lim Chuan Poh
- Simplified Chinese: 林泉宝
Transcriptions
Standard Mandarin
- Hanyu Pinyin: Lín Quánbǎo

Lim Chuan Poh is a Singaporean civil servant, diplomat and former lieutenant-general who was formerly the Singaporean Ambassador to Israel. He previously served as the Chief of Defence Force between 2000 and 2003. After leaving the Singapore Armed Forces (SAF) in 2003, Lim served as Permanent Secretary for Education until 2007 before serving as Chairman of the Agency for Science, Technology and Research (A*STAR), a statutory board under the Ministry of Trade and Industry. After his retirement in 2019, Lim was appointed Chairman of the Singapore Food Agency.

== Education ==
Upon his graduation from Raffles Institution, Lim was awarded the Singapore Armed Forces Overseas Scholarship in 1980.

Lim graduated from St John's College, Cambridge with a Bachelor of Arts (later promoted to Master of Arts by seniority) degree in mathematics.

He subsequently attended Camberley Staff College in 1988 and graduated with the Best Overseas Student Award.

Lim also completed a Master of Business Administration degree at Cornell University in 1993 and has attended the Advanced Management Program at Harvard Business School in 2003.

== Military career ==
Lim enlisted in the Singapore Armed Forces (SAF) in December 1979.

Throughout his military career, Lim has held various appointments; Commanding Officer, 3rd Battalion, Singapore Infantry Regiment; Commander (1990), 10th Singapore Infantry Brigade; Head, Joint Plans Department (1993); Commander, 9th Division (1996); Chief of Staff (General Staff); Chief of Army.

On 1 April 2000, Lim succeeded Bey Soo Khiang as Chief of Defence Force, and was promoted from Major-General to Lieutenant-General in June 2001.

Lim retired from the SAF on 1 April 2003 and was succeeded by Ng Yat Chung as Chief of Defence Force.

== Civil Service career ==
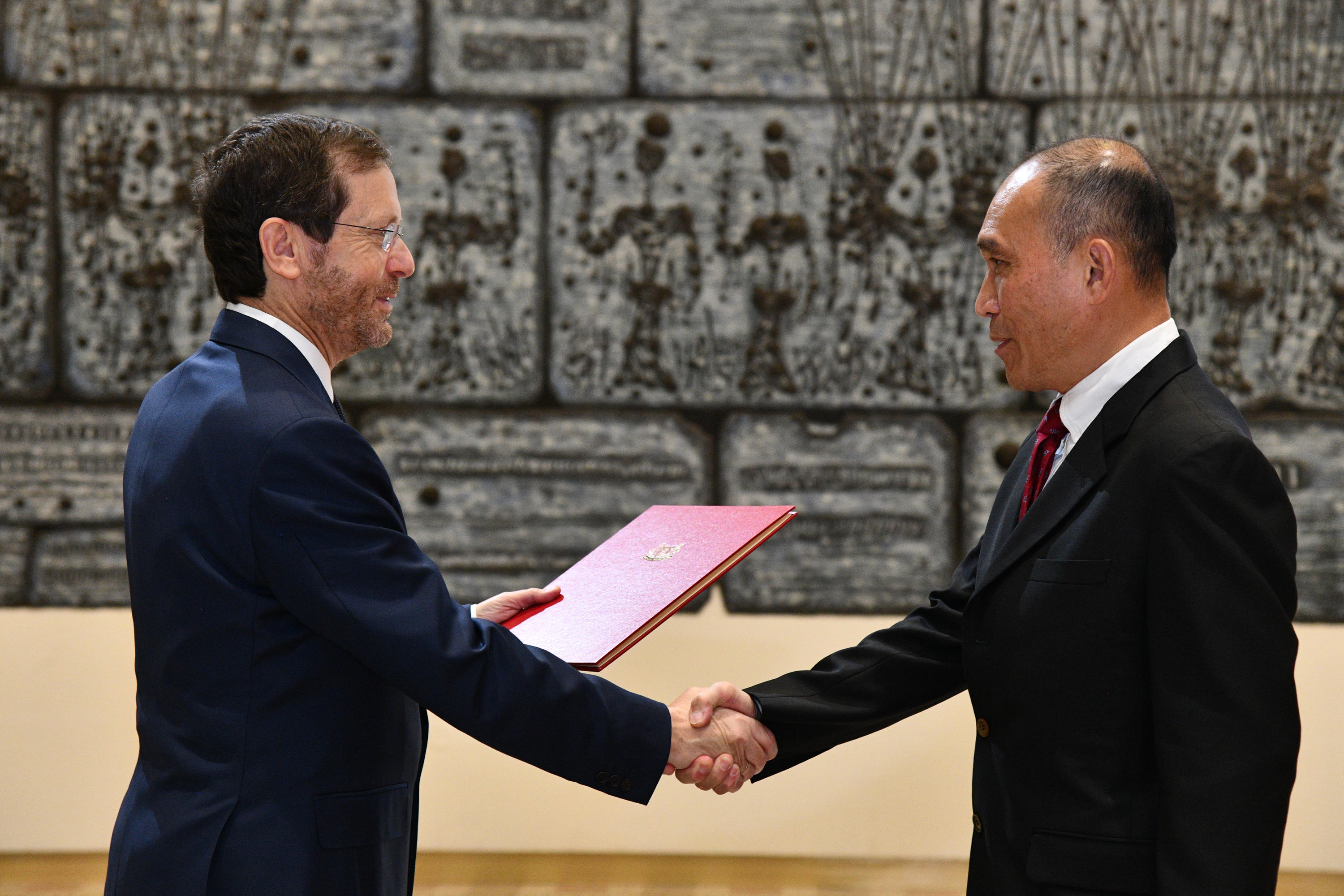
Lim presenting credentials to President of Israel Isaac Herzog in April 2022 in Israel as Singapore's Non-Resident Ambassador to Israel

After leaving the Singapore Armed Forces (SAF), Lim served as Permanent Secretary for Education (MOE) between 2003 and 2007. During his tenure as Permanent Secretary for Education, Lim had overseen the transformation of the publicly funded universities into autonomous universities and reviewed the university research framework to help those universities develop into research-intensive ones. He also guided the establishment of the Duke-NUS Medical School.

Lim served as Chairman of the Agency for Science, Technology and Research (A*STAR), a statutory board under the Ministry of Trade and Industry, between 2007 and 2019.

He is Chairman of the National Infocomm Security Committee and Chairman of Governing Board of the Lee Kong Chian School of Medicine at the Nanyang Technological University (NTU).

Lim is also a member of various other organisations; NTU, Biomedical Research Council at A*STAR, National Research Foundation, Science and Technology in Society (STS), and the World Premier International Initiative Programme Assessment and Review Committee in Japan.

Lim was appointed Non-Resident Ambassador to the State of Israel on 19 January 2021.

== Awards ==
- Public Administration Medal (Gold) (Military), in 1999.
- Commander of the Legion of Merit, in 1999 and 2001.
- Knight Grand Cross of the Order of the White Elephant, in 2001.
- Bintang Yudha Dharma Utama (The Grand Meritorious Military Order – 1st Class), in 2001.
- Meritorious Service Medal (Military), in 2003.
- Honorary Doctor of Science, by Loughborough University in 2008.
- Honorary Doctor of Laws, by Monash University in 2009.
- Fellowship of Imperial College, in 2010.
- Fellowship under the Invitation Programme for Leaders, by the Japanese Ministry of Foreign Affairs in 2010.
- Honorary Doctor of Laws, by the Arizona State University in 2012.

Military offices
Preceded by Lieutenant-General Bey Soo Khiang	4th Chief of Defence Force; 1 April 2000 - 1 April 2003	Succeeded by Major-General Ng Yat Chung
Preceded by Major-General Han Eng Juan	Chief of the Singapore Army; 1 July 1998 – 1 April 2000	Succeeded by Brigadier-General Ng Yat Chung
