= Singapore Volunteer Corps =

Militia unit

People's Defence Force
- Badge of the Singapore Volunteer Corps.
- Founded: 8 July 1854
- Disbanded: 31 March 1984
- Country: Singapore
- Allegiance: British Empire (1854–1963); Rejimen Askar Wataniah (1963–1965)
- Branch: Straits Settlements Volunteer Force (1922–1954); Singapore Military Forces (1954–1963); Malaysian Army (1963–1965); Singapore Armed Forces (1965–1984)
- Type: militia
- Motto: In Oriente Primus
- Engagements: 1915 Singapore Mutiny; Battle of Singapore

The Singapore Volunteer Corps or the Singapore Special Constabulary, was a militia unit established in 1854 as the Singapore Volunteer Rifle Corps. The Corps underwent several reorganisations and was known by various names throughout its history. It was renamed the People's Defence Force, the predecessor of the Singapore Armed Forces (SAF) in 1965.

== History ==
The idea for a volunteer corps to supplement the local constabulary for tighter internal security was first raised in 1846. The first corps, the Singapore Volunteer Rifles Corps (SVRC), was formed after the outbreak of riots between Chinese secret societies from 5–17 May 1854. The conflict caused widespread unrest and loss of life on the island, and was severe enough for the police to require the support of the military, some marines, European residents acting as Special constables, sepoys and even convicts to restore order. More than 400 people were killed and 300 houses burned down.

In view of the escalating violence from the Chinese secret societies, and the outbreak of the Crimean War, it was decided that a volunteer corps of European residents, led by British officers, would heighten security for the settlement. It was initially run on private funds, and members had to use their own weaponry. Formed on 8 July 1854 with the support of the Governor, Colonel William John Butterworth, the SVRC was one of the earliest official volunteer units in the British Empire. In 1857, the Indian Government passed the Volunteer Ordinance, which placed the SVRC under government control. They wore a green uniform similar to the Rifle Brigade's type: green tunic and trousers with shako, black tassels and epaulettes. The SVRC was disbanded in December 1887 when its numbers dwindled to a small half company.

== Singapore Volunteer Artillery Corps ==
In February 1888, the corps was revived as the Singapore Volunteer Artillery, their motto being In Oriente Primus (First in the Far East), which is kept by the Singapore Artillery. It was the first unit in the British Empire, regular or auxiliary, to field the Maxim Gun, a fully-automatic machine-gun. The guns arrived in 1889 funded by donations from the Sultan of Johor, members of the various communities in Singapore and prominent businessmen.

By 1901, the SVA's diverse composition of sub-units necessitated the change of name to the Singapore Volunteer Corps (SVC). It comprised artillery, infantry, engineers and rifle sections. During the First World War, the SVC, alongside the Royal Johor Military Force, helped to quell the Sepoy Mutiny of 1915, which resulted in the deaths of 11 volunteers. In 1922, the SVC was absorbed into the Straits Settlements Volunteer Force, forming the 1st and 2nd battalions of the SSVF.

The Corps was involved in the defence of Singapore during World War II. The end of the Japanese Occupation saw the SVC being revived in 1949.

In 1954, with the disbandment of the SSVF, the Singapore Volunteer Corps were absorbed into the Singapore Military Forces. The Corps assisted in defence during the Malayan Emergency, and then at the height of the Indonesian Confrontation, was deployed to protect vital installations in Singapore and southern Johor against saboteurs.

From 1963 to 1965 the SVC formed the Singapore based reserves of the Malaysian Army and were affiliated to the Rejimen Askar Wataniah.

== People's Defence Force ==
After the independence of Singapore and the passing of the People's Defence Force Act in 1965, the SVC was renamed the People's Defence Force and its units were absorbed into the Singapore Armed Forces as full-time National Service operational battalions. Many volunteer officers were also transferred to the regular army. The volunteers continued to play a role in national security, which included the training of part-time National Servicemen when National Service was introduced in 1967. However, with the introduction of compulsory full-time national service and dwindling volunteer enlistment, their role diminished. 101 PDF, the last volunteer battalion, was disbanded in 31 March 1984.

== Notable members ==
- Colonel J. E. Gabain (1948-1962) Assistant Commandant SVC
- Yusof bin Ishak, Yang di-Pertuan Negara of Singapore (1959-1965); President of Singapore (1965-1970)
- Goh Keng Swee, Deputy Prime Minister (1968-1985)
- David Saul Marshall, Chief Minister (1955-1956)
- Othman Wok, Minister of Social Affairs (1963-1977)
- Elizabeth Choy
- William Allmond Codrington Goode, Governor of Singapore (1955, 1957–1959); Yang di-Pertuan Negara (1959)
- T. J. D. Campbell, Head, 1st Singapore Volunteer Corps, later Director, General Staff of the People's Defence Force
- Ong Pang Boon, Minister for Education
- Wee Toon Boon, Minister of State for Defence

== Alliances ==
- United Kingdom – Royal Artillery; Singapore Royal Artillery (Volunteers)
- United Kingdom – Royal Electrical and Mechanical Engineers; Singapore Electrical and Mechanical Engineers
- United Kingdom – Royal Corps of Signals; Singapore Corps of Signals (Volunteers)

== See also ==
- Straits Settlements Volunteer Force
- Dalforce
- SAF Volunteer Corps (SAFVC)
