= 143 Squadron =

143 Squadron may refer to:

- No. 143 Squadron RAF, United Kingdom
- 143 Squadron, Republic of Singapore Air Force
- 143rd Airlift Squadron, United States Air Force
- VF-143, United States Navy
- VFA-143, United States Navy
