= Michael Teo =

Michael Teo may refer to:

== People ==
- Michael Teo Eng Cheng, former Singaporean diplomat and Chief of Air Force
- Michael Teo Yu Keng, Malaysian politician and gynaecologist
- Michael Teo, a fictional character from Crazy Rich Asians
