= ADSD =

ADSD may refer to:

- Adductor spasmodic dysphonia, medical condition affecting the voice
- Air Defence Systems Division, Singapore Air Force unit based at Chong Pang Camp
- PDE8B, enzyme also known as ADSD
