= Bey Soo Khiang =

Singaporean business executive and former air force general

- Born: 10 August 1955 (age 70); Colony of Singapore
- Allegiance: Singapore
- Branch: Republic of Singapore Air Force
- Service years: 1973–2000
- Rank: Lieutenant-General
- Commands: Chief of Defence Force; Chief of Air Force
- Education: University of Cambridge; Harvard Kennedy School

Bey Soo Khiang
- Simplified Chinese: 马士强
Transcriptions
Standard Mandarin
- Hanyu Pinyin: Mǎ Shìqiáng

Bey Soo Khiang (born 10 August 1955) is a Singaporean former lieutenant-general who served as Chief of Defence Force between 1995 and 2000. He was the first Chief of Air Force to serve as Chief of Defence Force.

== Education ==
Bey was awarded the Singapore Armed Forces Overseas Scholarship in 1974. He holds Bachelor of Arts and Master of Arts degrees in engineering from the University of Cambridge. He also completed a Master of Public Administration degree at the John F. Kennedy School of Government at Harvard University, and attended the six-week Advanced Management Program at Harvard Business School.

== Military career ==
Bey enlisted into the Singapore Armed Forces (SAF) in 1973.

Prior to his appointment as Chief of Defence Force on 1 July 1995, Bey served as Chief of Air Force. In addition to his career in the SAF, Bey was also appointed to Singapore Technologies Engineering and Singapore Airlines Limited's Board of Directors while serving as Chief of Defence Force.

Bey retired from the SAF on 1 April 2000, and was succeeded by Lim Chuan Poh as Chief of Defence Force.

== Post-military career ==
After leaving the SAF in 2000, Bey joined Singapore Airlines (SIA) as Executive Vice President (Technical) and was promoted to Senior EVP (Technical & Human Resources) two years later. During his time in SIA, he led the project to introduce the Airbus A380 into SIA and also served in the following positions: Chairman of SIA Cargo Pte Ltd; Chairman of Silkair Pte Ltd; Chairman of Singapore Flying College; Board Director of SIA Engineering Company; Virgin Atlantic Limited; Virgin Atlantic Airways Limited; Virgin Travel Group Limited. He is also an active board member in the Sentosa Development Corporation. In early 2010, he assumed the post of Senior Executive Vice President for Marketing & Corporate Services. Bey left SIA on 28 February 2011.

Bey was appointed as the Vice-Chairman of RGE Pte Ltd in March 2011.

Military offices
Preceded by Brigadier-General Michael Teo Eng Cheng	Chief of the Republic of Singapore Air Force; 1 September 1992 – 30 June 1995	Succeeded by Brigadier-General Goh Yong Siang
Preceded by Lieutenant-General Ng Jui Ping	3rd Chief of Defence Force of Singapore; 1 July 1995 – 1 April 2000	Succeeded by Major-General Lim Chuan Poh
