= Lim Chu Kang Camp II =

Singaporean military camp

Coordinates: 1.376°N 103.6972°E

Lim Chu Kang Camp II is located at Lim Chu Kang in the northwest part of North Region, Singapore. The camp is operated by the Republic of Singapore Air Force and located on Lim Chu Kang Road opposite Choa Chu Kang Cemetery.

The camp houses elements from Singapore Air Defense Artillery 163 Squadron (Medium altitude air defence) and 160 Squadron.
