= Republic of Singapore Air Force =

Air service branch of Singapore's military

- Angkatan Udara Republik Singapura (Malay) 新加坡共和国空军 (Chinese) சிங்கப்பூர் ஆகாயப்படை (Tamil)
- Crest of the Republic of Singapore Air Force
- Founded: 1 September 1968; 58 years ago
- Country: Singapore
- Type: Air force
- Role: Aerial warfare
- Size: 6,000 active personnel 7,500 reserve personnel
- Part of: Singapore Armed Forces
- Motto: "Above All"
- March: "Republic of Singapore Air Force March"
- Engagements: See list: Multi-National Force – Iraq ISAF Combined Task Force 151 Operation Inherent Resolve
- Website: Official website

Commanders
- Prime Minister of Singapore: Lawrence Wong
- Minister for Defence: Chan Chun Sing
- Chief of Defence Force: VADM Aaron Beng
- Chief of Air Force: MG Kelvin Fan Sui Siong
- Chief of Staff - Air Staff / Air Sustainability Officer: BG Ho Kum Luen
- Air Force Command Chief: ME6 Ng See Lye

Insignia
- Roundel

- Ensign

- State Colour

- Logo

Aircraft flown
- Electronic warfare: G550 AEW
- Fighter: F-16C/D/D+, F-15SG
- Helicopter: CH-47SD/F, H225M, S-70B
- Attack helicopter: AH-64D
- Trainer helicopter: EC120
- Patrol: Fokker 50 MPA
- Reconnaissance: Heron 1, Hermes 450, Orbiter 4
- Trainer: M346, PC-21
- Transport: C-130H, Fokker 50 UTL, A330 MRTT
- Tanker: KC-130B/H, A330 MRTT

The Republic of Singapore Air Force (RSAF) is the aerial service branch of the Singapore Armed Forces (SAF) responsible for controlling and defending the airspace of the country, and providing air support to the Army and Navy. It was established in 1968 as the Singapore Air Defence Command (SADC) before renaming to its current name in 1975.

As one of the larger and more technologically advanced air forces in Southeast Asia, the RSAF has undertaken a significant role in Singapore's military defence strategy since its formation. The RSAF is one of the more modern air forces in the region.

The RSAF currently has four domestic airbases – Paya Lebar, Changi, Sembawang and Tengah. The RSAF also has overseas detachments in various countries, most notably in Australia, France, Thailand and the United States. As of 2023, the RSAF has a strength of 6,000 active personnel.

== History ==
=== Early years ===
In January 1968, the United Kingdom, which by this time had lost most of its global prestige especially after the Suez Crisis and was facing major financial difficulties that were greatly exacerbated by the devaluation of the pound, announced the imminent withdrawal of all its troops "East of Suez" by the end of 1971. Prior to then, Singapore had depended heavily on Britain's Royal Air Force (RAF) for its air defence, while the newly established Singapore Armed Forces (SAF) had concentrated its efforts mainly on building up the land-based Singapore Army.

The predecessor to the RSAF, the SADC, was formed on 1 September 1968. The SADC's immediate task was to set up the Flying Training School to train pilots. Qualified flying instructors were obtained through Airwork Services Limited, a company specialising in defence services. Basic training for pilots was carried out using two Cessna light aircraft hired from the Singapore Flying Club. The SADC also enlisted the help of the Royal Air Force which introduced the first flying training syllabus and provided two ex-RAF pilots as instructors, as well as facilities and services at Seletar Airport. Finally, the first batch of six pilot trainees were sent to the United Kingdom in August 1968 to undergo training in various technical disciplines. The training was based on the Hawker Hunter, the SADC's first air defence fighter. The following month, another pioneer group of technicians, this time from the rotary wing, were sent to France to begin their technical training on the Aérospatiale Alouette III helicopter. In 1969, a number of local RAF technicians were released to join the fledgling SADC. These local technicians (local other ranks) had experience working on fixed-wing RAF aircraft such as the Hawker Hunter, Gloster Javelin, English Electric Canberra, English Electric Lightning and Avro Shackleton; as well as rotary-wing RAF aircraft such as the Bristol Belvedere, Westland Wessex and Westland Whirlwind.

Eight Cessna 172K aircraft—the SADC's first—arrived in May 1969 to be used for basic pilot training. By December, the first batch of students completed the course. Of these, six were sent to the UK to receive further training. On their return to Singapore in 1970, they were ready to operate the then newly acquired Hawker Hunter fighter aircraft.

The pace of training pilots and ground crew picked up gradually. On 1 August 1969, Minister for the Interior and Defence, Lim Kim San, inaugurated the Flying Training School (FTS) at Tengah Air Base (then known as RAF Tengah). The inauguration of FTS brought SADC closer to its goal of fulfilling the heavy responsibility of defending Singapore's airspace.

The subsequent arrival of the BAC Strikemasters in 1969, used for advanced phase flying training, meant that pilot trainees were now able to earn their initial wings locally rather than overseas. The first batch of locally trained fighter pilots were trained at the FTS and graduated in November 1970. Amongst this batch was 2LT Goh Yong Siang, who later rose to the appointment of Chief of Air Force on 1 July 1995. Gradually, the SADC had its own pilots, flying instructors, air traffic controllers, and ground crew.

When Britain brought forward its plan to withdraw its forces by September 1971, the SADC was suddenly entrusted with a huge responsibility and resources. Britain's former air bases—Tengah, Seletar, Sembawang and Changi—were handed over to the SADC, as well as its air defence radar station and Bloodhound II surface-to-air missiles.

In 1973, the SADC procured Shorts Skyvan search-and-locate aircraft and Douglas A-4 Skyhawk fighter-bombers. With a reliable mix of fighters, fighter-bombers, helicopters and transport aircraft, the SADC was ready to assume the functions of a full-fledged air force. On 1 April 1975, the SADC was renamed the Republic of Singapore Air Force (RSAF).

One of its first commanders was LTC Ee Tean Chye.

=== 21st century ===
The RSAF celebrated its 50th anniversary in 2018 with the theme "Our Home, Above All". The RSAF celebrated its Golden Jubilee with an extended flypast during the national day parade on 9 August and also performed 2 sessions of aerial display at the Marina Barrage on 11 and 12 August.

Combat operations

- 2004–2008: Multi-National Force – Iraq. Aircraft participated in the Iraq War and returned home after two or three months of deployment in the Persian Gulf without any ground troops involved. Singapore's withdrawal was acknowledged on 23 December 2008.
- May 2007–June 2013: International Security Assistance Force. Deployment of close to 500 personnel including those from the Republic of Singapore Air Force, as part of Singapore's contributions to the multinational stabilisation and reconstruction efforts in Afghanistan.
- 2014–2015: Military intervention against ISIL. Offering military aid in the ongoing war on terror with a Boeing KC-135 Stratotanker and assistant intelligence analysts.

Repatriation operations

- In March 2026, the RSAF were involved in two repatriation flight from Jeddah in Saudi Arabia, bringing a total of 299 Singaporeans and their dependents back to Singapore. Additionally, 24 Filipino workers were also aboard the second flight.

=== Description of logo ===
The crest consists of the national coat of arms supported by the silver wings of the Air Force within a bowl of golden laurels.

== List of chiefs of Air Force ==
{No.	Portrait	Name (born–died)	Term of office			Ref.
{No.	Portrait	Name (born–died)	Took office	Left office	Time in office	Ref.
Commander, Singapore Air Defence Command
1		Ee Tean Chye	1970	1972	1–2 years	
Director Air Staff
1		John Francis Langer	1973	1975	1–2 years	
2		W E Kelly	1975	1975	0 years	
3		D J Rhodes	1975	1976	0–1 years	
4		Murray Alexander Turnbull	1976	1977	0–1 years	
5		Liu Ching Chuan	1977	1980	2–3 years	
Deputy Commander, Republic of Singapore Air Force
1		Colonel; Michael Teo Eng Cheng (born 1948)	1980	1982	1–2 years	
2		Gary Yeo Ping Yong	1982	1984	1–2 years	
(1)		Colonel; Michael Teo Eng Cheng (born 1948)	1984	1985	0–1 years	
Commander, Republic of Singapore Air Force
1		Brigadier-general; Michael Teo Eng Cheng (born 1948)	1985	1990	4–5 years	
Chief of Air Force
1		Brigadier-General; Michael Teo Eng Cheng (born 1948)	1 May 1990	31 August 1992	2 years, 122 days	
2		Major-General; Bey Soo Khiang (born 1955)	1 September 1992	30 June 1995	2 years, 302 days	
3		Major-General; Goh Yong Siang (born 1951)	1 July 1995	30 June 1998	2 years, 364 days	
4		Major-General; Raymund Ng Teck Heng (born 1956)	1 July 1998	1 April 2001	2 years, 274 days	
5		Major-General; Lim Kim Choon (born 1958)	1 April 2001	24 March 2006	4 years, 357 days	
6		Major-General; Ng Chee Khern (born 1965)	24 March 2006	10 December 2009	3 years, 261 days	
7		Major-General; Ng Chee Meng (born 1968)	10 December 2009	25 March 2013	3 years, 105 days	
8		Major-General; Hoo Cher Mou (born 1966)	25 March 2013	28 March 2016	3 years, 3 days	
9		Major-General; Mervyn Tan Wei Ming (born 1972)	28 March 2016	22 March 2019	2 years, 359 days	
10		Major-General; Kelvin Khong Boon Leong (born 1976)	22 March 2019	22 March 2024	5 years, 0 days	
11		Major-General; Kelvin Fan Sui Siong (born 1980)	22 March 2024	Incumbent	2 years, 245 days	

== Organisation ==
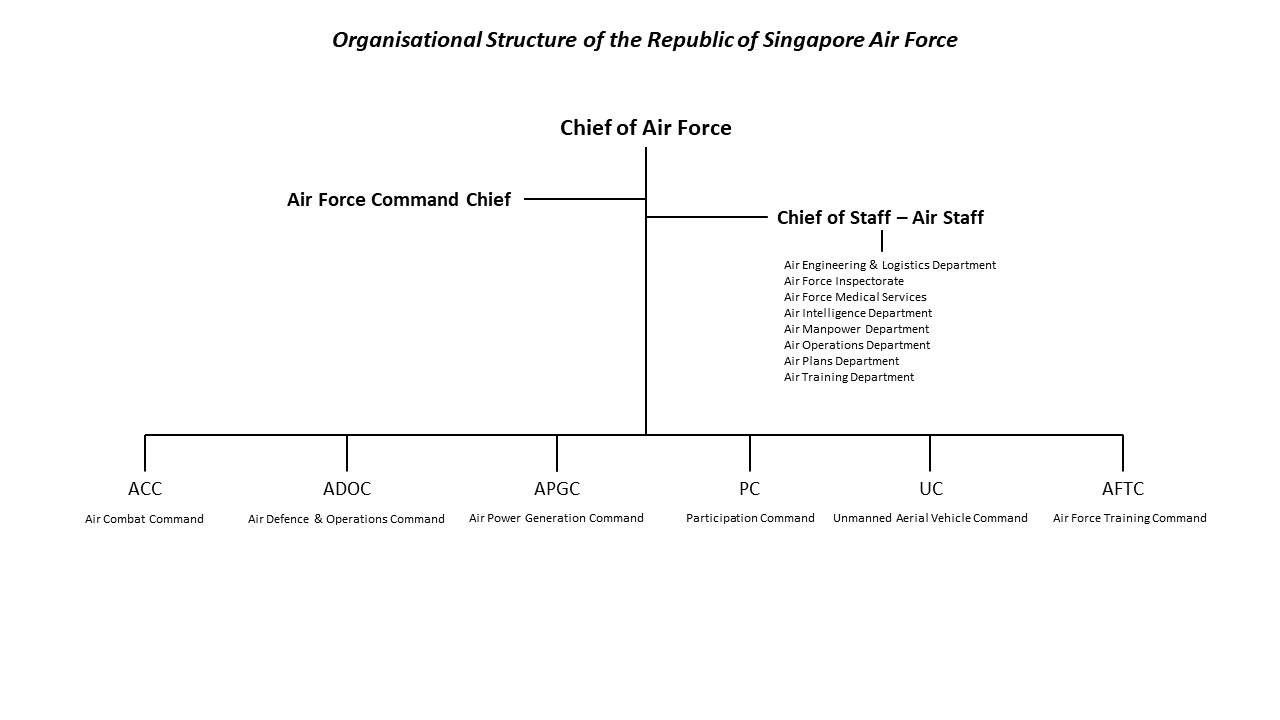
Organisation Structure of the RSAF

=== Commands and units ===
On 5 January 2007, Defence Minister Teo Chee Hean announced that the Air Force organisation chart will be re-structured into five major commands, namely the Air Defence and Operations Command (ADOC), the Air Combat Command (ACC), the Participation Command (PC), the Air Power Generation Command (APGC) and the Unmanned Aerial Vehicle (UAV) Command (UC). The first to be inaugurated was ADOC, along the restructuring announcement.

Air Defence and Operations Command is the principal agency in charge of planning and executing peacetime operations and air defence. ADOC is also responsible for providing ground-based air defence units of the RSAF.

Unmanned Aerial Vehicle Command was the second command to be inaugurated and become operational in May 2007.

The next command to be inaugurated was PC in January 2008.

The last two commands, ACC and APGC, were inaugurated together in August 2008 in conjunction with the RSAF 40th Anniversary. The ACC will bring together fighter and transport squadrons under one command, with central planning, control and execution of the air battle in operations. The APGC will enhance the missions of the ACC by ensuring that all air bases remain operational at all times, as well as improving the servicing and turn-around of aircraft to ensure continuous and responsive operations.

==== Air Combat Command (ACC) ====
The ACC ("Poised And Deadly") is responsible for the planning, control and execution of the air battle in operations. It brings together all fighter and transport squadrons that will carry out these tasks under a single command which will be responsible for training the pilots and aircrew to think and operate in a fully integrated way. The ACC consists of the following groups:

- HQ ACC
- Integrated Systems Development Group (ISDG)
- Operations Development Group (ODG)
- Fighter Group (FG) ("Decisive And Deadly")
  - 140 Squadron ("Stand Firm In Defence")
  - 142 Squadron ("Honour And Glory")
  - 143 Squadron ("We Dare")
  - 145 Squadron ("Swift And Valiant")
  - 149 Squadron ("Steadfast")
  - Peace Carvin II – Luke Air Force Base, Arizona, USA
  - Peace Carvin V – Mountain Home Air Force Base, Idaho, USA
- Transport Group (TG) ("Project And Deliver")
  - 111 Squadron ("Vigilance In Control")
  - 112 Squadron ("Determined To Deliver")
  - 121 Squadron ("Seek And Destroy")
  - 122 Squadron ("Dependable")

==== Air Power Generation Command (APGC) ====
The APGC ("Generate And Sustain") is set up to enable the RSAF to generate and sustain effective, timely and robust air power to meet the operational needs of the SAF. With the APGC, higher operational efficiency within each RSAF Air Base, and secondly, greater integration across the four bases are achieved. Units are classified under Air Base Operability (ABO) and Aircraft Generation (AcG). The APGC consists of the following groups:

- HQ APGC
- Operations Development Group (ODG)
- Airbase Medical Operations Centre (AMOC)
- Changi Air Base ("Together In Excellence")
  - 208 Squadron ("Reliable And Vigilant Always")
  - 508 Squadron ("Unrivalled Support")
  - 608 Squadron ("Vigour And Vigilance")
  - 708 Squadron ("Agile And Dependable")
  - 808 Squadron ("Ready And Vigilant") - under 5 AELG
- Paya Lebar Air Base ("Strength Through Readiness")
  - 207 Squadron ("Support Towards Excellence")
  - 507 Squadron ("Forever Onward")
  - 607 Squadron ("Dare Us")
  - 707 Squadron ("Resolute And Responsive")
  - 7 Air Engineering and Logistics Group (7 AELG) ("Pride In Support")
    - 807 Squadron ("Swift And Effective")
    - 817 Squadron ("Dedicated And Precise")
- Sembawang Air Base ("Swift And Resolute")
  - 206 Squadron ("Precision In Control")
  - 506 Squadron ("Steadfast Support")
  - 606 Squadron ("Uphold And Persevere")
  - 706 Squadron ("Swift And Reliable")
  - 6 Air Engineering and Logistics Group (6 AELG) ("Swift And Steadfast")
    - 806 Squadron ("Agile And Expeditious")
    - 816 Squadron ("Precise And Dependable")
- Tengah Air Base ("Always Vigilant")
  - 205 Squadron ("Excellence And Beyond")
  - 505 Squadron ("Swift and Tenacious")
  - 605 Squadron ("Alert And Steadfast")
  - 705 Squadron ("Zeal In Duty")
  - 5 Air Engineering and Logistics Group (5 AELG) ("Excellence Always")
    - 805 Squadron ("Responsive And Dependable")
    - 815 Squadron ("Swift And Precise")

The four support squadrons still remain organic to each Base but are under direct command of APGC. These four squadrons are: Airfield Maintenance Squadron (AMS), Ground Logistics Squadron (GLS), Field Defence Squadron (FDS) and Flying Support Squadron (FSS).

The Airbase Medical Operations Centre (AMOC) was formed from the Medical Flights of each GLS in November 2025.

==== UAV Command (UC) ====
The main structures under UC ("Persistent And Precise") are Operations & System Development Group (OSDG), headed by the Deputy Commander of UC. UC consists of the following groups:

- HQ UC
- UAV Group (UG) ("Persistent And Focused")
  - 116 Squadron ("Courageous And Tenacious")
  - 119 Squadron ("Precise And Cohesive")
  - 128 Squadron ("Focused And Ready")
- Imagery Exploitation Group (IXG) ("Precise And Timely")
  - 129 Squadron ("Swift And Sharp")
  - 138 Squadron ("Poised To Deliver")
- 1 Air Engineering and Logistics Group (1 AELG) ("Swift And Sure")
  - 801 Squadron ("Swift And Dependable")
  - 811 Squadron ("Persistent And Sure")

==== Air Defence & Operations Command (ADOC) ====
The ADOC ("Vigilant & Ready") consist of the following:

- HQ ADOC
- Air Surveillance Control Group (ASCG) ("Vigilant And Decisive")
  - 200 Squadron ("Sense Fight Kill")
  - 202 Squadron ("Decisive And Resilient")
  - 203 Squadron ("Serve To Preserve")
- National Air Defence Group (ADG) ("Ever Vigilant")
  - 160 Squadron ("Alert Always")
  - 163 Squadron ("Above The Best")
  - 165 Squadron ("Pride In Protection")
  - ADG MTC ("Mission Success Always")
- Air Operations Control Group (AOCG) ("Always In Control")
- 9 Air Engineering and Logistics Group (9 AELG) ("With Unity We Support")
  - 113 Squadron ("Mission First")
  - 809 Squadron ("Ready And Swift")
  - 819 Squadron ("Precise And Reliable")

==== Participation Command (PC) ====
The PC ("Integrate & Dominate") consists of the following groups:

- HQ PC
- Operations Development Group (ODG)
- Helicopter Group (HeliG) ("Dare & Will")
  - 120 Squadron ("Strive To Achieve")
  - 123 Squadron ("Swift And Precise")
  - 125 Squadron ("Swift And Bold")
  - 126 Squadron ("Ready And Able")
  - 127 Squadron ("Strength Courage Swiftness")
  - Peace Vanguard ("Forging Ahead") – Marana, Arizona, USA
- Tactical Air Support Group (TASG) ("Integrated & Ready")
  - 1 Medical Squadron ("Courage And Conviction")
  - 101 Squadron
  - 102 Squadron
  - 103 Squadron ("Swift and Prompt")
  - 105 Squadron ("Robust And Resolute")
- Divisional Air Defence Group (DAG) ("Vigilant And Lethal")
  - 3 Divisional Air Defence Artillery ("Vigilant And Valiant") support 3rd Singaporse Division
  - 6 Divisional Air Defence Artillery ("Vigilant And Valiant") support 6th Singaporse Division
  - 9 Divisional Air Defence Artillery ("Vigilant And Valiant") support 9th Singaporse Division
  - 18 Divisional Air Defence Artillery ("Always Ahead") support 21st Division
  - 201 Squadron ("Deploy Detect Defend")
  - DAG MTC ("Move Forward Safely")

==== Air Force Training Command (AFTC) ====
The Air Force Training Command (AFTC) is an amalgamation of the former Air Force School, Flying Training School and UAV Training school which facilitates training of future pilots and ground crew of the RSAF. It is located at 550 Airport Road, Singapore 534236.

The training schools and squadrons under AFTC ("Excellence") consist of the following:

- HQ AFTC
- Flying Training Institute (FTI) ("Strength Through Knowledge And Skills")
  - 124 Squadron ("Strive For Excellence")
  - 130 Squadron ("Aim To Strike" or "Eagle") – RAAF Base Pearce, Perth, Western Australia, Australia
  - 150 Squadron ("Forward We Strive") – Cazaux Air Base, France
  - Air Grading Centre ("Soar Through Knowledge") – Jandakot, Perth, Western Australia
  - Standards Squadron ("Pride Through Professionalism")
  - UAV Training School ("Redefine Perfection")
- Air Warfare Training Institute (AWTI) ("Excellence Through Knowledge And Skills")
  - AWO School ("Competency Through Knowledge")
  - ADSS School ("Look Forward")
  - AOSX School
  - Air Intelligence School
- Air Engineering Training Institute (AETI) ("Towards Excellence")
  - Advanced AFE School ("Inspiring Excellence")
  - Aircraft Engineering School ("Engineering Excellence")
  - Civil Engineering School ("Excellence In Resilience")
  - Networks, C2 and Air Defence School ("Excellence In Networked Air Defence")
  - Supply Chain School ("Delivering Excellence")
- Training Development Group (TDG)

==== Retired units ====
- 130 Squadron (Flying Training School at Tengah) (1968–1994) BAC Strikemaster and S211
- 131 Squadron ("Harrier") (1983–1986 at Paya Lebar, 1979–1983 at Tengah) T-33A and S211
- 141 Squadron ("Detect To Deter") (1972- c.2008) Hawker hunters and F-5 also known as the Merlins
- 144 Squadron ("Dare To Excel") (1979- c 2015) F-5E/T

== Air bases ==
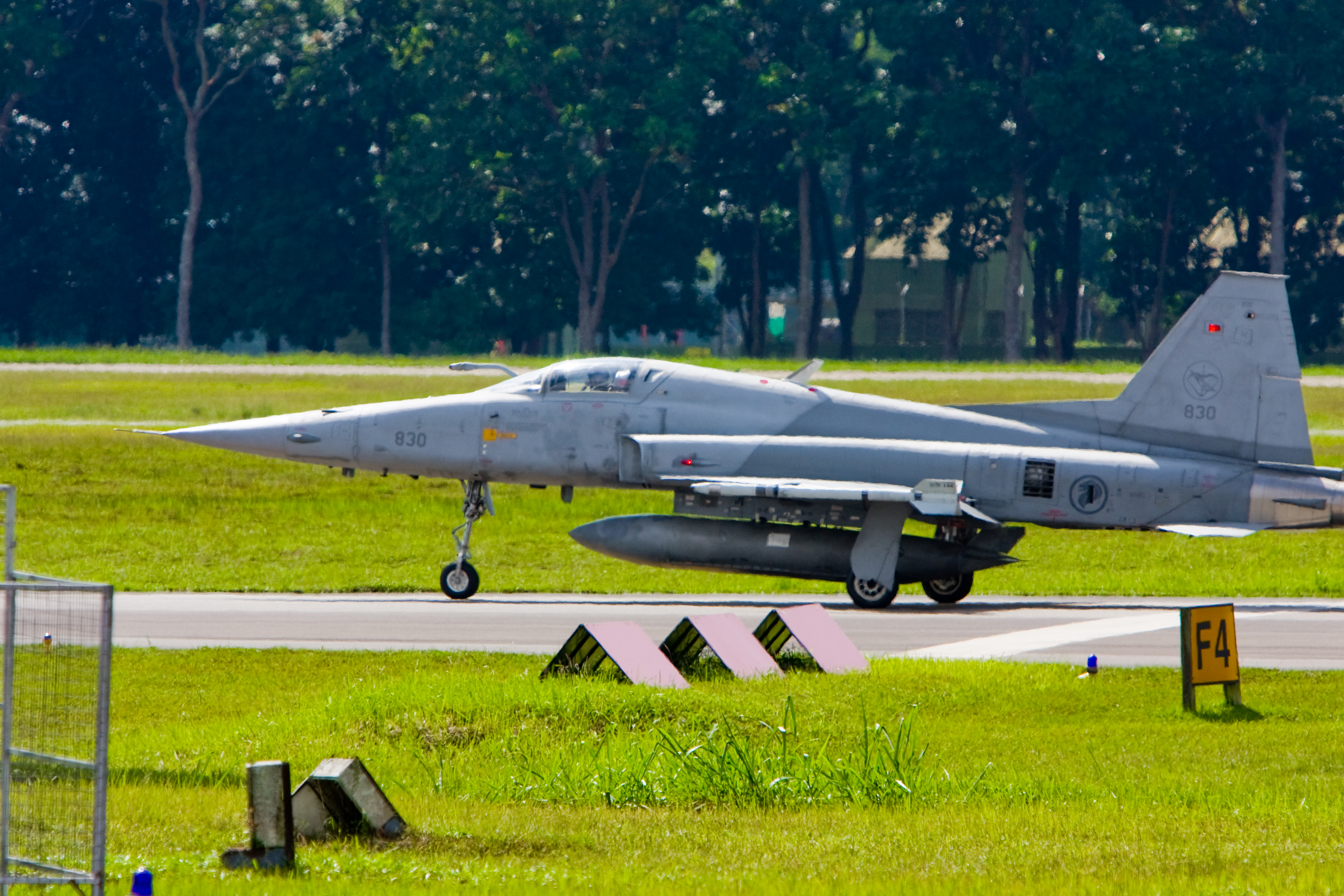
An F-5S of 144 Sqn preparing for take-off.

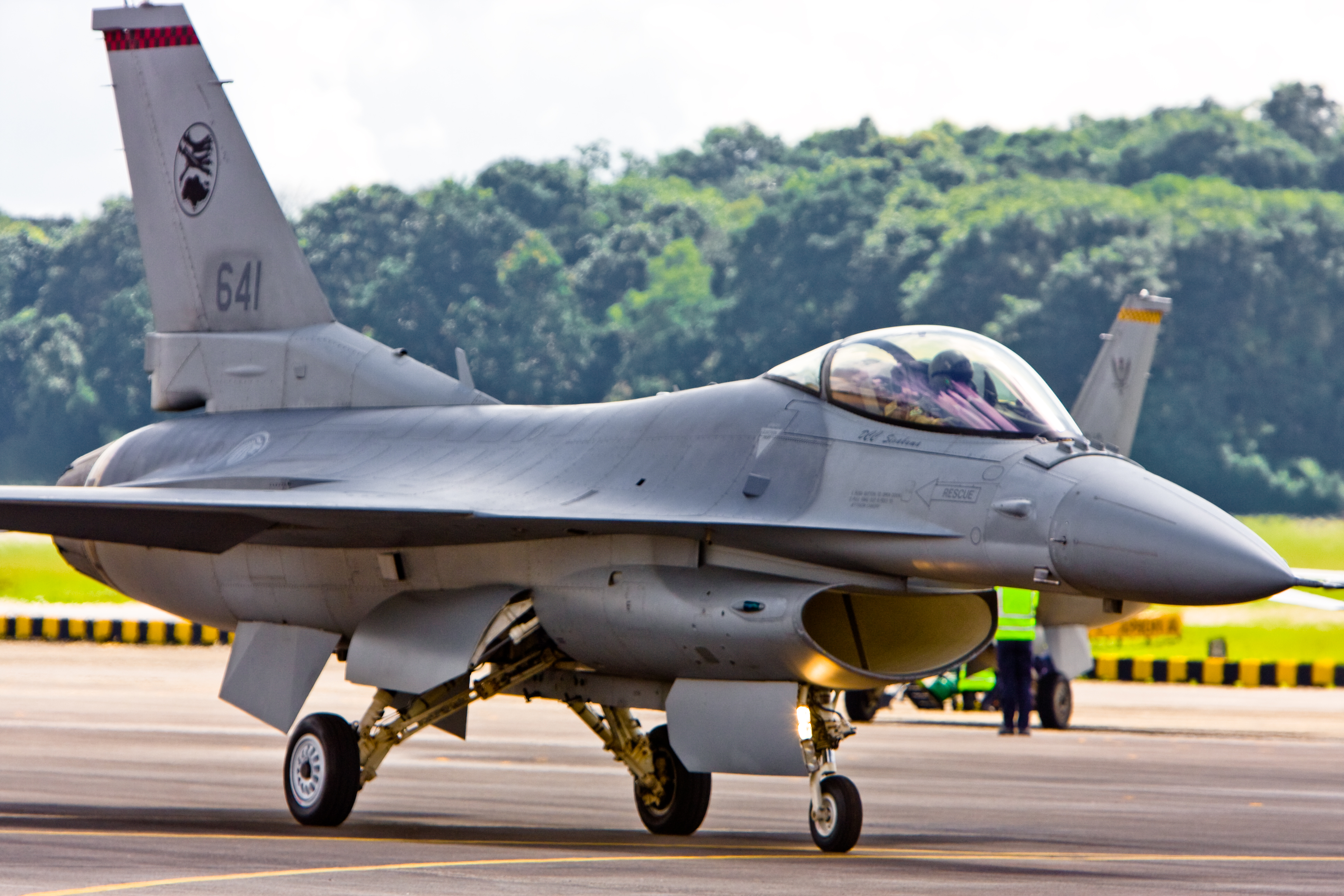
An F-16C of 140 Sqn.

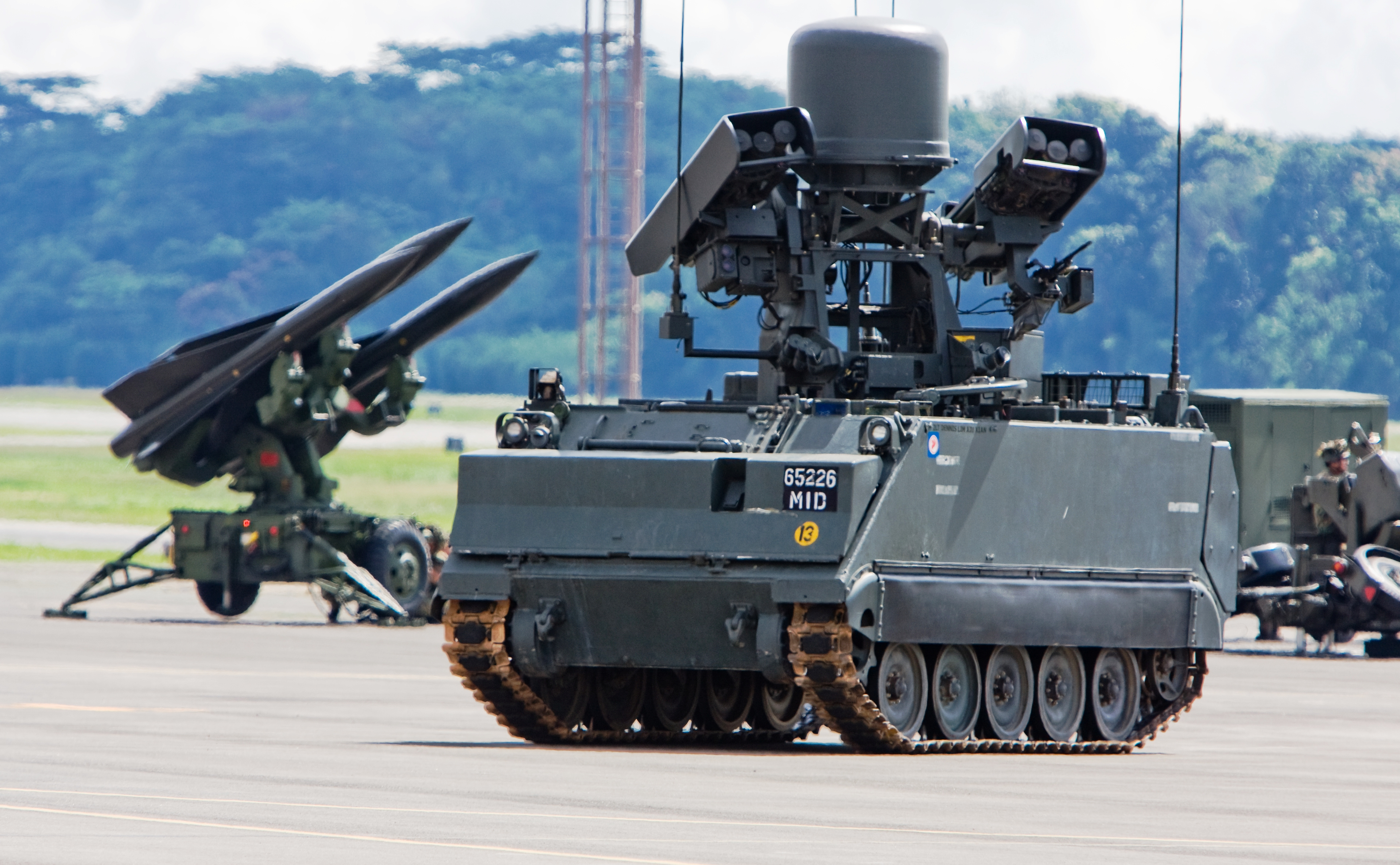
Demonstration of a M-113A2 Ultra Mechanised Igla IFU on deployment, visible in the background is an I-HAWK SAM launcher.

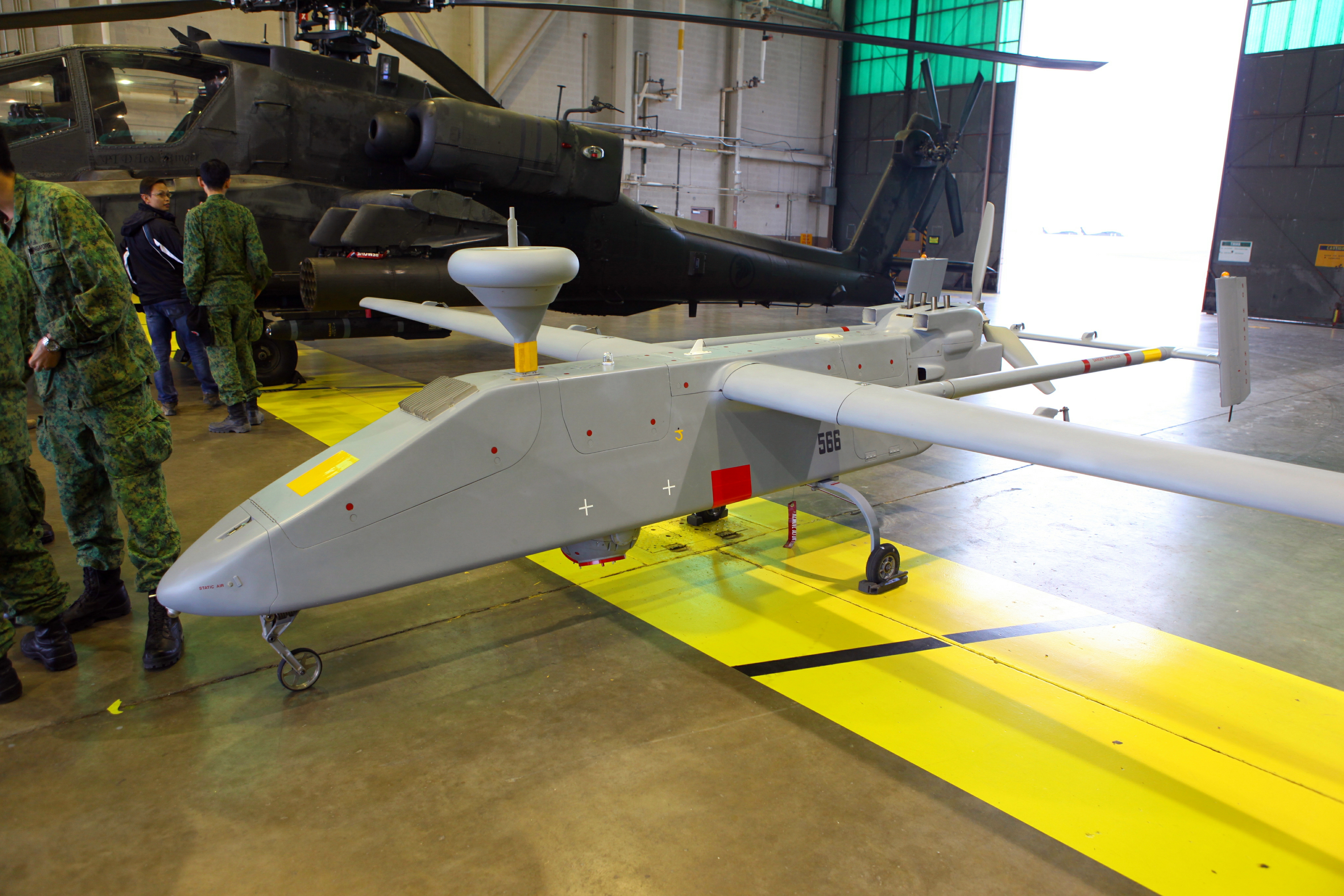
Exercise Forging Sabre 2009, an RSAF's IAI Searcher II UAV parked inside the hangar of Henry Post Army Airfield, United States.

- Changi Air Base (West)
  - 121 Sqn 10 Fokker 50 (Transport), 8 Fokker 50 ME2 (Maritime patrol)
- Changi Air Base (East)
  - 112 Sqn 6 Airbus A330 MRTT (Aerial refuelling)
- Paya Lebar Air Base
  - 122 Sqn 10 C-130H (Transport)
  - 142 Sqn 20 F-15SG (Strike)
  - 149 Sqn 20 F-15SG (Strike)
- Sembawang Air Base
  - 120 Sqn 20 AH-64D Longbow Apache (Attack)
  - 123 Sqn 8 S-70B Seahawks (ASW)
  - 124 Sqn 5 EC120 Colibri (Training)
  - 125 Sqn 16 H225M (Transport/SAR)
  - 126 Sqn CH-47SD, CH-47F (Heavylift/SAR)
  - 127 Sqn CH-47SD, CH-47F (Heavylift/SAR)
- Tengah Air Base
  - 111 Sqn 4 G550 (AEW & C)
  - 116 Sqn Hermes 450 (Reconnaissance)
  - 140 Sqn 9 F-16C (Interceptor), 6 F-16D Blk 52 (Strike)
  - 143 Sqn 5 F-16C (Interceptor), 8 F-16D Blk 52 (Strike)
  - 145 Sqn 20 F-16 Blk 52+
  - RSAF Black Knights – RSAF's aerobatic team. (Disbanded)
- Chong Pang Camp SADA (Singapore Air Defence Artillery)
  - 3rd DA RBS-70 SAM, IGLA SAM, Giraffe Radar
  - 6th DA RBS-70 SAM, IGLA SAM, Giraffe Radar
  - 9th DA RBS-70 SAM, IGLA SAM, Giraffe Radar
  - 18th DA RBS-70 SAM, Mistral SAM
  - 165 Sqn Rapier SAM, RBS-70 SAM, SPYDER SAM
- Lim Chu Kang Camp II SADA (Singapore Air Defense Artillery)
  - 163 Sqn Raytheon I-HAWK SAM (Medium altitude air defence) (being replaced by SAMP/T)
  - 160 Sqn Oerlikon 35 mm AA Guns (Airfield defence)
- Choa Chu Kang Camp
  - 201 Sqn FPS 117 Radar (Fighter control, SAM control, Surveillance, ASP)
- Other assets of SADA (Singapore Air Defense Artillery)
  - 203 Sqn LORADS Radar (RASP, SAR, "listening watch" for distress signals)
- Murai Camp
  - 119 Sqn IAI Heron (Reconnaissance)
  - 128 Sqn 400 IAI Searcher (Reconnaissance)
- Classified
  - 200 Sqn 'Air Defence'
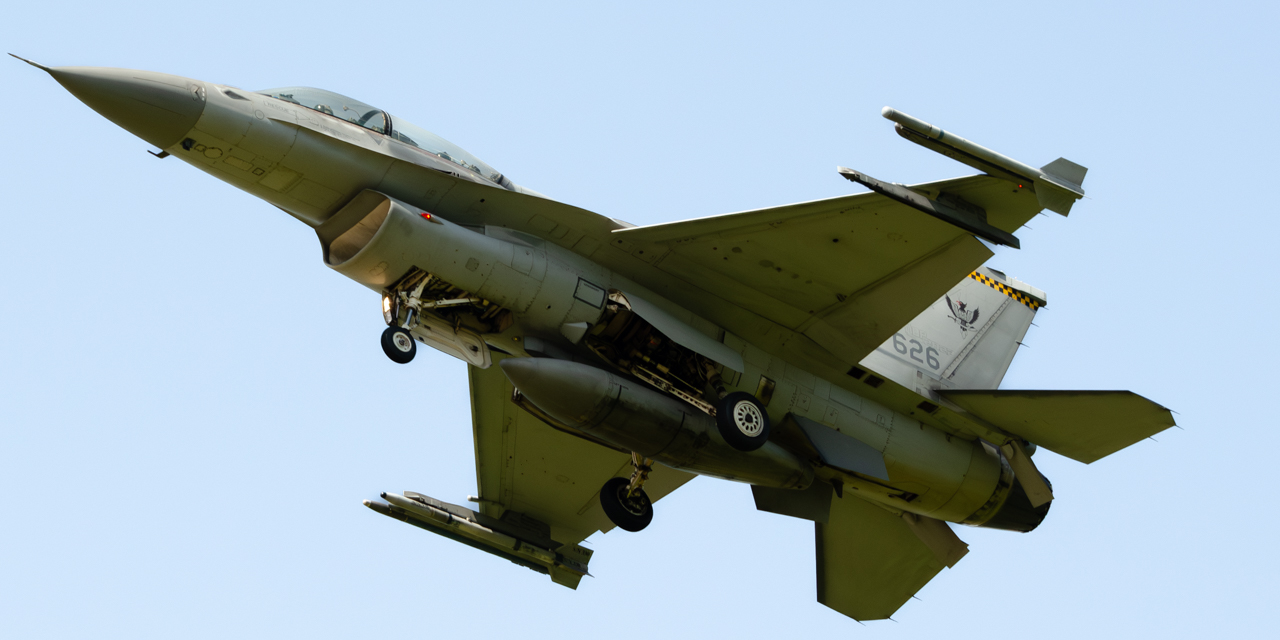
  - RSAF F-16D Block 52 landing at RAAF Pearce
    202 Sqn 'Network Management'

== Overseas detachments ==
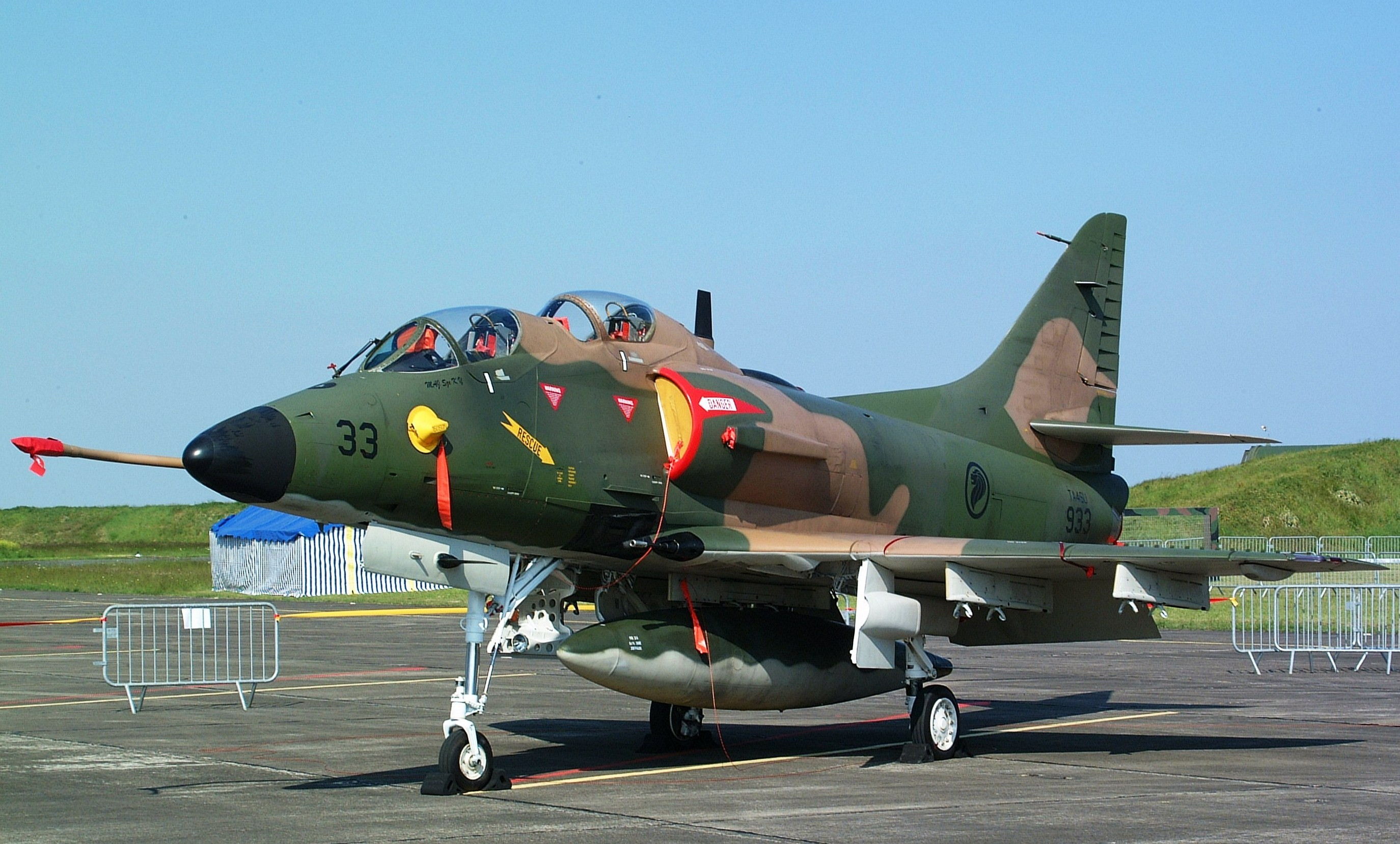
A TA-4SU on the flightline of Cazaux Air Base

- BA 120 Cazaux Airbase (France)
  - 150 Sqn, 12 × Alenia Aermacchi M-346 Master
- Luke Air Force Base (United States)
  - 425 FTS, 8 × F-16C, 6 × F-16D+ (Peace Carvin II F-16 Training)
- Mountain Home Air Force Base (United States)
  - 428 FTS, 20 × F-15SG, (Peace Carvin V F-15 Training)
- Oakey Army Aviation Centre (Australia)
  - 127 Sqn, 6 × CH-47D (Training/Support for army exercises)
- RAAF Base Pearce (Australia)
  - 130 Sqn, 19 × PC-21 (Basic Training)
- Silverbell Army Heliport (United States)
  - E/1-285th AVN, 8 × AH-64SG (AH-64SG Training)
- Udorn Royal Thai Air Force Base (Thailand)
  - For F-16 training with Royal Thai Air Force

== Overview ==
The backbone of the RSAF is formed by the Block 52/52+ F-16 Fighting Falcons. These are armed with US-supplied AIM-120C AMRAAM missiles and LANTIRN targeting pods, laser guided munitions and conformal fuel tanks for long-range strike.

While Singapore initially bought as many as 70 F-16 planes, on 18 November 2004, it was announced that the RSAF would offer its remaining 7 F-16A/Bs to the Royal Thai Air Force. It is believed that these early Block 15OCU aircraft were upgraded to "Falcon One" standard by ST Aerospace before the transfer and delivered in late 2005. In return, the RSAF was permitted to train at the Udon Royal Thai Air Force Base in north-east Thailand for a specified number of days each year. This would mean that the RSAF will operate only the Block 52/52+ model, as many as 62 F-16CJ/DJ planes.

Due to severe airspace constraints within Singapore, the RSAF operates its aircraft at several overseas locations to provide greater exposure to its pilots. With the F-16C/D Fighting Falcons, KC-135R Stratotankers, AH-64D Apaches and CH-47SD Chinook helicopters based in the United States, the Marchetti S-211s, PC-21s, and Super Puma helicopters in Australia, and the Alenia Aermacchi M-346 Master in France, almost one third of the force's inventory is based outside Singapore.

In 1994, the RSAF commenced a modernisation program for its fleet of approximately 49 operational (R)F-5E and F-5F aircraft. The upgrade was performed by Singapore Technologies Aerospace (STAero) and the upgraded aircraft were designated (R)F-5S and F-5T respectively, operating from Paya Lebar Air Base. These upgraded F-5S/T, equipped with the Galileo Avionica's FIAR Grifo-F X-band Radar are thought to be capable of firing the AIM-120 AMRAAM missile but to date, no actual live-firing has actually been reported. For in-flight refuelling, four KC-135Rs and four KC-130Bs are commissioned to support the fighter force of F-16C/Ds and (R)F-5S/Ts.

Airborne Early Warning and Control (AEW&C) capability was introduced in 1987 when four E-2C Hawkeyes were delivered to 111 Squadron. The duty of Maritime Patrol and Coastal surveillance is performed by the eight Fokker 50 MPA (entered service in 1991) of 121 Squadron, which can be armed with long-range anti-shipping AGM-84 Harpoon missiles and ASW torpedoes.

As part of its fleet renewal process, the RSAF officially withdrew its fleet of ST Aerospace A-4SU Super Skyhawk from front-line service on 31 March 2005 after 31 years of operations. The A-4SUs' achievements included flying directly from Singapore to the Philippines, incorporating the RSAF's first air-to-air refuelling mission in 1986, as well as the excellent aerobatic display of the 'red and white' Super Skyhawks flown by the RSAF Black Knights during Asian Aerospace 1990. A month before its retirement, the Skyhawk squadron won top honours in a strike exercise against its more modern F-16 and F-5 counterparts.

Singapore ordered a total of 20 AH-64D Apache Longbow attack helicopters in two batches. After a long period of negotiations over the delivery of the sophisticated Longbow Fire-control radar, the first batch of eight aircraft, fitted with the Fire Control Radar, was delivered on 17 May 2002. The second batch of 12 Apaches were ordered in 2001 even before the first delivery took place. All of the initial eight Apaches are based in the United States. Three of the Apache Longbows returned in January 2006 at the request of the Minister of Defence.

Apart from the fifteen CH-47SDs delivered from 1996, a new batch of fifteen aircraft was ordered in 1997, with an option of four extra airframes. At least 30 CH-47SD have been delivered and are in service at Sembawang Air Base. It is believed that these had been upgraded to the SD standard prior to delivery.

Eight CH-47SDs were also deployed to support the relief efforts in the aftermath of the 2004 Indian Ocean earthquake and tsunami. It was the first and one of the few countries to reach the affected areas. The RSAF deployed dozens of C-130Hs, CH-47SDs and AS 332Ms there along with three of the RSN's latest Landing Ship Tanks (RSS Endurance, RSS Persistence and RSS Endeavour of the Endurance class LST) as well as Singapore Armed Forces vehicles, engineers, and medical teams.

In September 2005, the RSAF sent three CH-47SD Chinook helicopters, later augmented by a fourth CH-47SD Chinook, to provide assistance in the rescue and evacuation of stranded civilians after Hurricane Katrina struck New Orleans and nearby areas in the United States. The humanitarian effort by Singapore involved more aircraft than any other foreign countries.

Since 2003, the RSAF has also made deployments of KC-135 tankers and C-130 aircraft to the Persian Gulf in support of the multinational efforts for the reconstruction of Iraq. RSAF personnel have carried out airlift, transportation and supply, and air-to-air refuelling missions in support of the multinational forces, assisting the Coalition in carrying supplies and personnel, transporting humanitarian material and conducting medical evacuation operations. In September 2013, Defence Minister Ng Eng Hen stated in a parliamentary reply that Singapore would soon acquire the SAMP/T air defence system.

RSAF day is celebrated on 1 September annually, in 2018 a combined flypast including the new A330 MRTT with a special 50th anniversary livery took place at Tengah Air Base.

== Personnel ==
Military ranks in the Singapore Armed Forces are identical across the three services except for the flag ranks of the Republic of Singapore Navy. They are based on the Army model. The official table of ranks stops at three stars for all four services.

Like the Navy, the majority of Air Force personnel are regulars. This is due to the specialised and technical nature of many jobs. The employment of National Servicemen in various roles are limited mostly to the infantry-like Field Defence Squadrons which do not require such specialised training.

== Aircraft ==
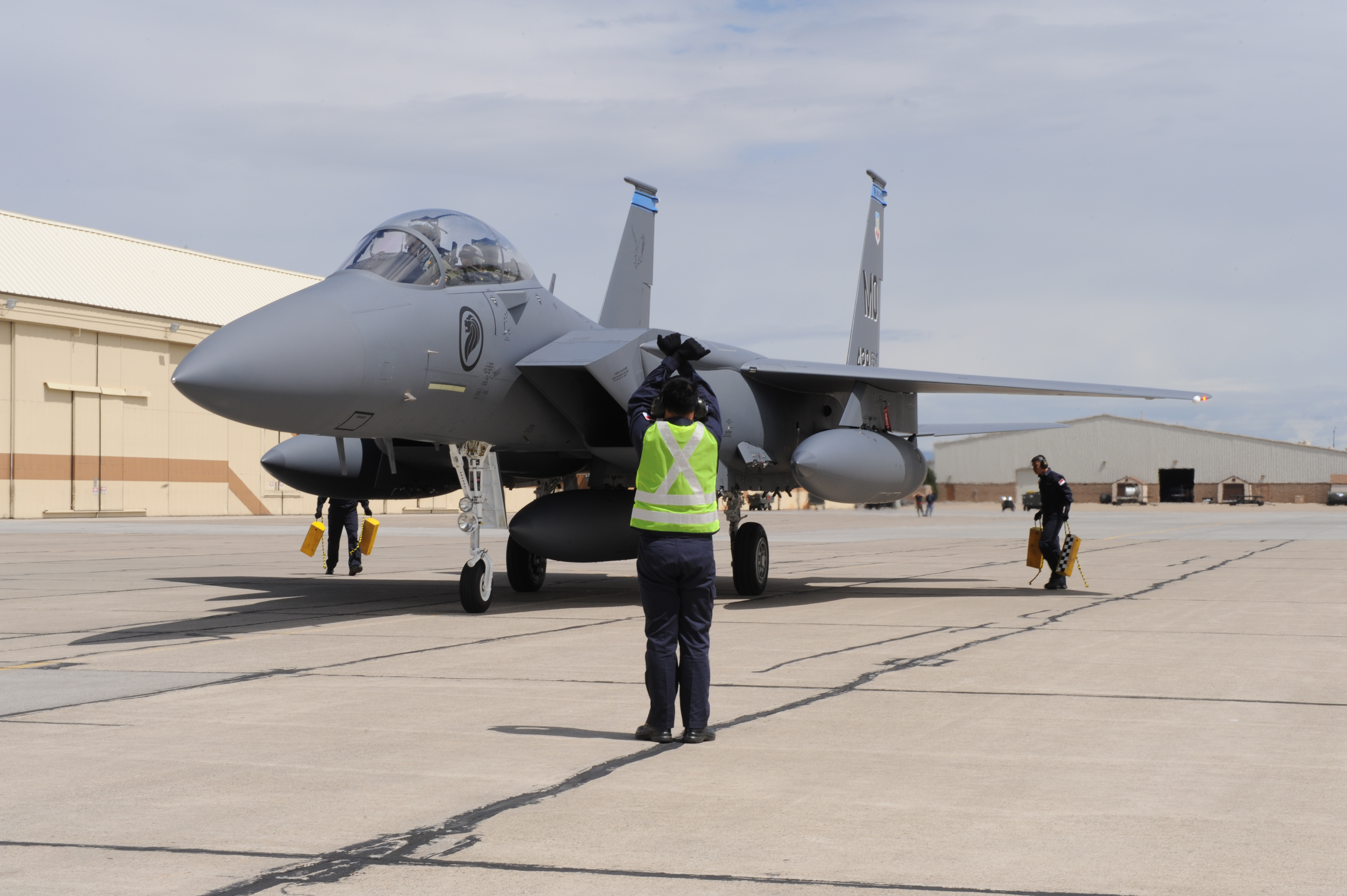
F-15SG of the 428th Fighter Squadron at Mountain Home Air Force Base

In February 2003, Singapore joined the Joint Strike Fighter program's System Design and Development (SDD) Phase, as a Security Cooperation Participant (SCP). The first deliveries of the F-35 Lightning II are not expected before 2021, but replacement for the bulk of the A-4SUs was needed by 2007. As a start, 20 F-16D Block 52+ have been delivered from 2003 under project Peace Carvin IV.

The RSAF embarked on its Next Generation Fighter (NGF) programme to replace the aging A-4SUs. The original list of competitors was shortlisted to the final two – Dassault Rafale and the Boeing F-15SG Strike Eagle. The F-15SG is a variant of the F-15E Strike Eagle and is similar in configuration to the F-15K sold to South Korea, but differs in the addition of the APG-63(V)3 active electronically scanned array (AESA) radar developed by Raytheon. The F-15SG is powered by two General Electric F110-GE-129 29,400 lbf (131 kN) thrust engines. The DSTA (Defense Science & Technology Agency) conducted a detailed technical assessment, simulations, and other tests to assess the final selection. On 6 September 2005, it was announced that the F-15SG had won the contract over the Rafale. An initial order placed in 2005 for 12 aircraft with the option to purchase 8 more. On 22 October 2007, Singapore's Ministry of Defence (MINDEF) exercised the option to purchase eight more F-15SG fighters as part of the original contract signed in 2005. Along with this buy, an additional order for four F-15SGs was made, bringing the total number of F-15SGs purchased by the start of 2008 to 24.

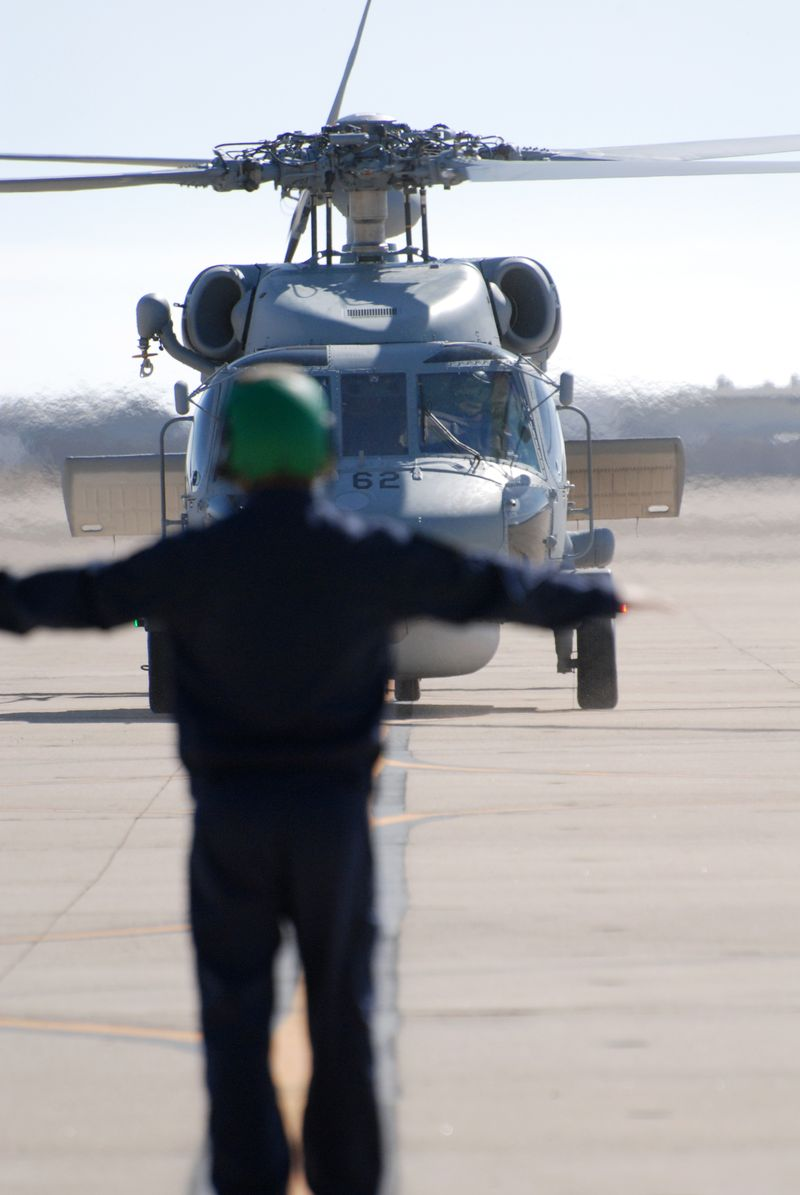
A Singapore Peace Triton S-70B being guided by a member of the RSN on the flight line of Naval Air Station North Island

In January 2005, it was announced that 6 Sikorsky S-70B (derivative of SH-60 Seahawk) naval helicopters will be purchased, complete with anti-surface and anti-submarine weapons and sensors. 2 more Seahawks were ordered in 2013. The Seahawks are operated by RSAF pilots, with system specialists of the Republic of Singapore Navy operating the sensors and weaponry. They operate from the Navy's new Formidable class frigates, and when operating from land are based at Sembawang Air Base. All 20 AH-64D Longbow attack helicopters have been delivered to the RSAF. 12 of these were deployed back to Singapore and took part in combined arms exercises with the Army, with the remaining 8 helicopters being part of the Peace Vanguard detachment based in the United States.

In April 2007, it was announced that the 4 E-2C Hawkeyes were to be replaced with 4 Gulfstream G550s fitted with the IAI EL/W-2085 radar which would become the primary airborne early warning aircraft for the RSAF. Not included in the deal is an additional G550 as an AEW trainer, which will be acquired and maintained by ST Aerospace on behalf of RSAF.

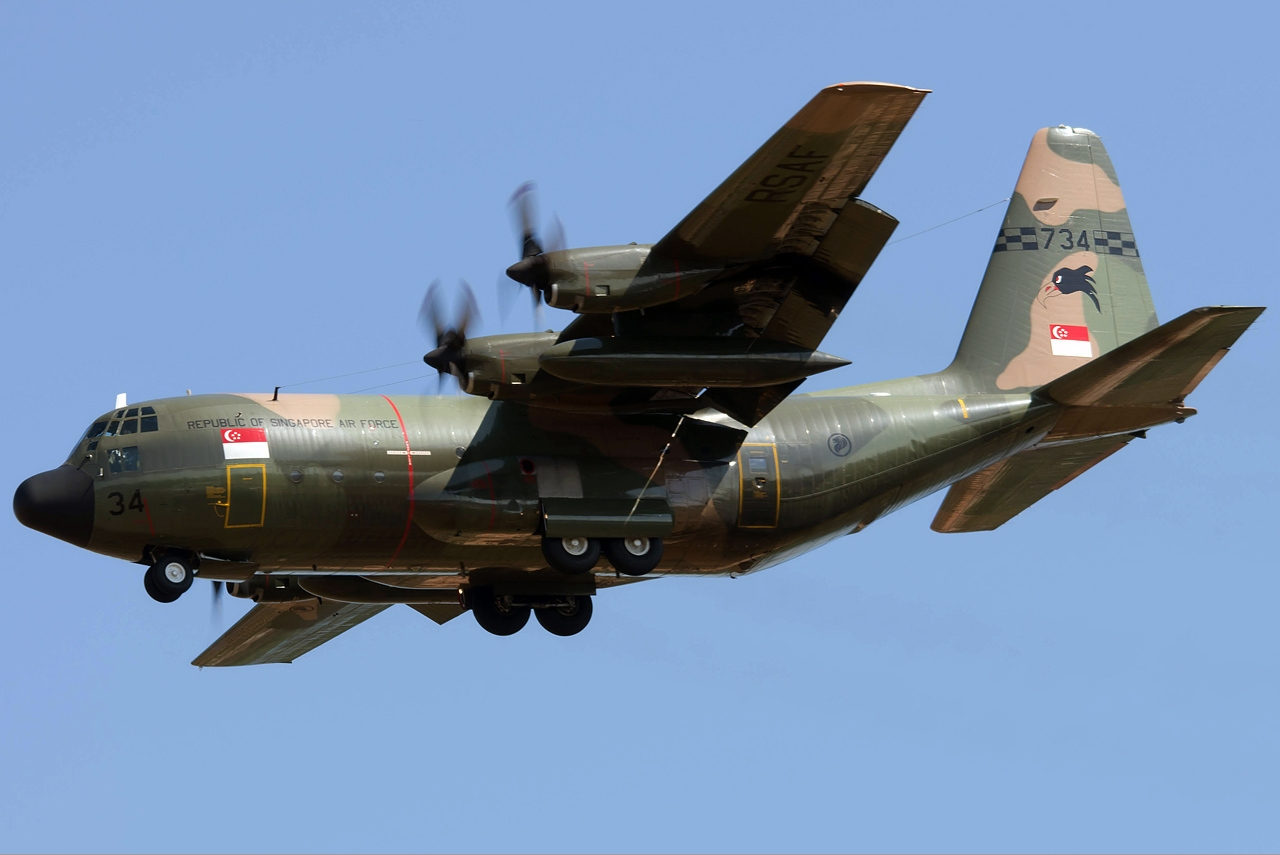
An RSAF KC-130H Hercules over Darwin International Airport

In July 2010, the Alenia Aermacchi M-346 Master was selected by the RSAF to replace the A-4SU in the Advanced Jet Training (AJT) role, currently based at BA 120 Cazaux Air Base in France. In a press release by the MINDEF on 28 September 2008, ST Aerospace had been awarded the contract to acquire twelve M-346 and a ground based training system on behalf of RSAF. As stipulated in the contract, ST Aerospace will act as the main contractor to maintain the aircraft after delivery by Alenia Aermacchi while Boeing would supply the training system. Delivery date is scheduled from 2012 onwards.

The backbone of the transport fleet are the four KC-130B, one KC-130H and five C-130H Hercules transport aircraft, which are expected to remain in service through 2030, will be undergoing an extensive modernisation process to bring all ten existing airframes to the same common standard. The first airframe, a KC-130B, was returned to frontline service on 21 September 2010. ST Aerospace, the main contractor behind the project, is expected to upgrade the other nine airframes for the RSAF within the next seven years. Included in the package is the replacement of cockpit flight management system with a modern glass cockpit avionics suite, central engine displays to replace analogue gauges, improved voice communications, digital autopilot, flight director as well as a digital weather radar, which will make the aircraft Global Air Traffic Management-compliant. Also, the C-130Bs will receive an auxiliary power unit and environmental control system in common with the C-130Hs. Once the upgrade is completed, this will effectively give the RSAF five KC-130Hs and five C-130Hs.

In December 2010, the RSAF issued a letter of request to inspect stored ex-US Navy P-3C Orion aircraft that have been retired from active duty. Lockheed Martin believes the RSAF has a requirement of 4 to 5 of these aircraft, which would be modernised extensively before reintroduction into active service.

On 30 June 2018, Defence Minister Ng Eng Hen announced that the F-16's replacement will be announced soon. Meanwhile, the KC-135Rs are being replaced by the A330 MRTT while replacements for other fixed-wing aircraft and helicopters are announced.

On 18 January 2019, MINDEF officially confirmed the procurement of F-35s for a full evaluation of their capabilities and suitability before deciding on a full fleet to replace the aging F-16 fleet. On 1 March 2019, MINDEF announced that they will send a Letter of Request (LOR) to purchase 4 F-35s with an option of 8 more after the evaluation. On 9 January 2020 the U.S. Defense Security Cooperation Agency approved a possible sale to Singapore of four F-35B short takeoff and vertical landing (STOVL) variants with the option to purchase an additional eight F-35Bs and up to 13 Pratt & Whitney F135 engines and other related equipment for an estimated total cost of $2.75 billion. On 24 February 2023, MINDEF exercised its option and purchased an additional 8 F-35Bs currently on track for delivery by 2028, with the originally purchased 4 expected to be delivered by 2026. On 28 February 2024, Ng Eng Hen announced in parliament the procurement of 8 F-35A's expected to be delivered by 2030, tallying up a total of 20 F-35's on delivery.

On 3 March 2025, Defence Minister Ng Eng Hen announced that the Fokker-50 Maritime Patrol Aircraft's replacement will be announced soon, with the Boeing P-8A and Airbus C295 in consideration. On 10 September 2025, new Defence Minister Chan Chun Sing informed US Secretary of Defense Pete Hegseth, that Singapore had decided to acquire 4 Boeing P-8As to replace the Fokker-50 Maritime Patrol Aircraft during his introductory visit to the US.

Through its social media sites, the RSAF announced on 3 November 2025 that MINDEF/SAF will replace the Hermes 450 (H450) UAV, which had been in service since 2007 and was 'becoming obsolete', with the Hermes 900 (H900) Unmanned aerial vehicle (UAV).

== Aircraft fleet ==
=== Current aircraft ===
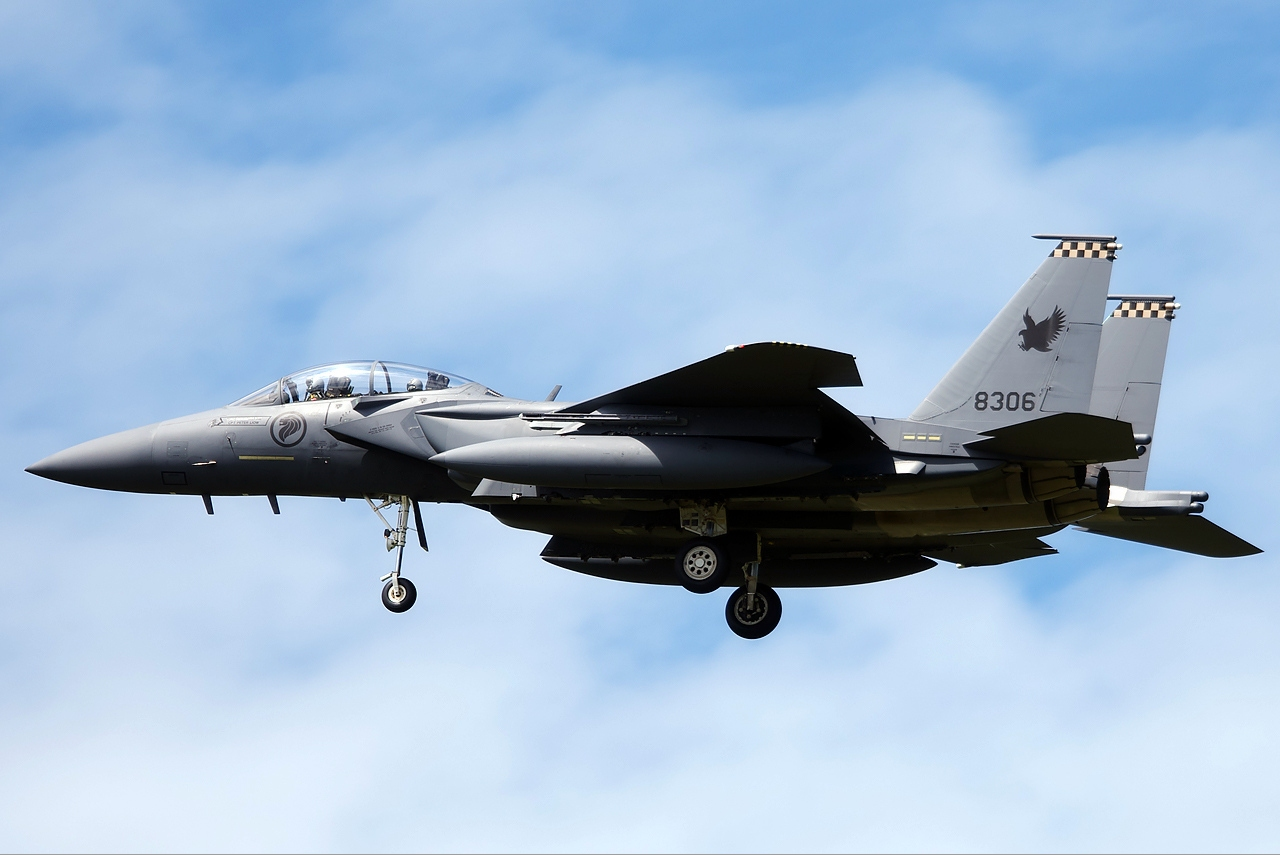
F-15SG Strike Eagle

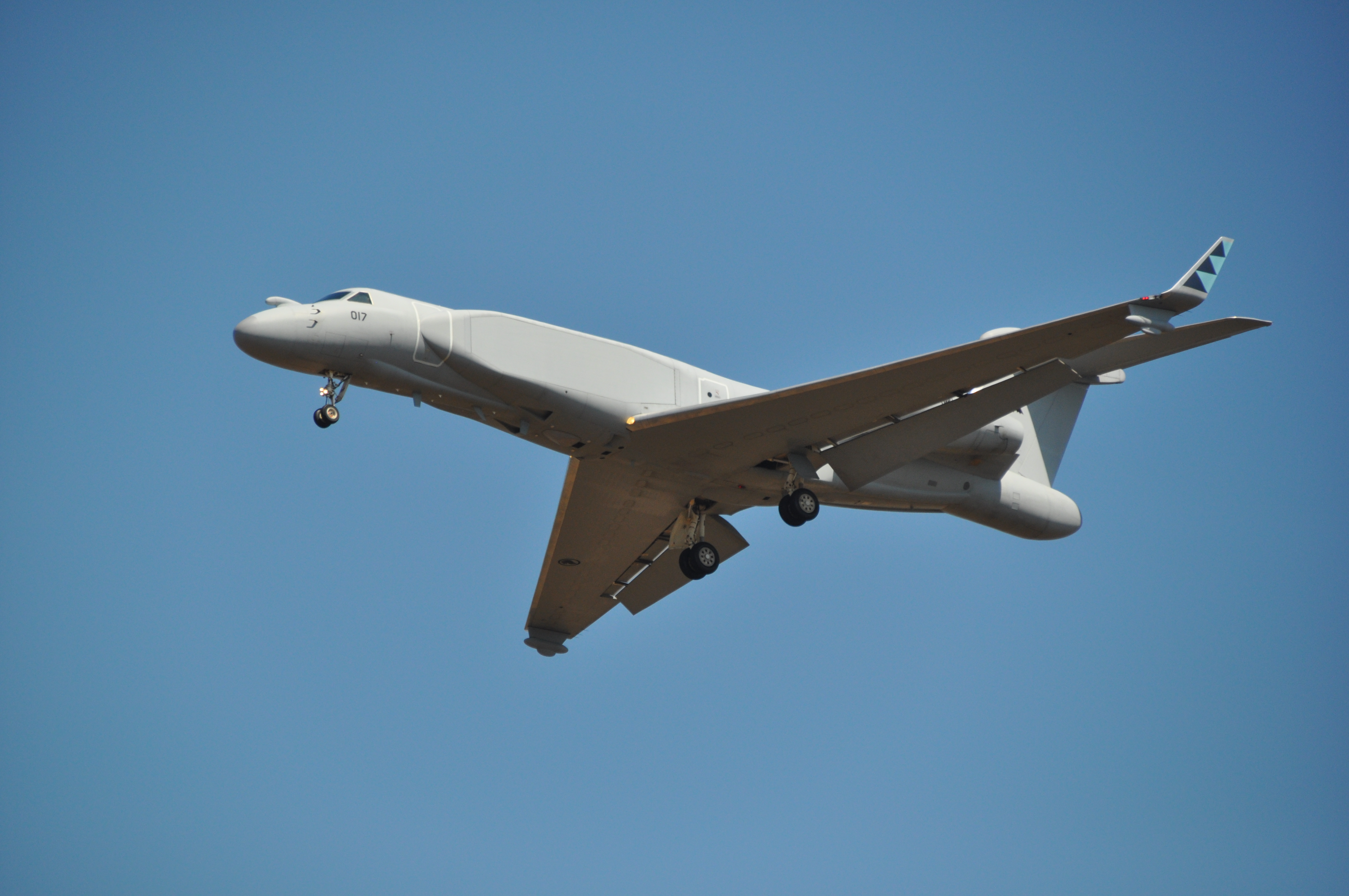
EL/W-2085 AEW

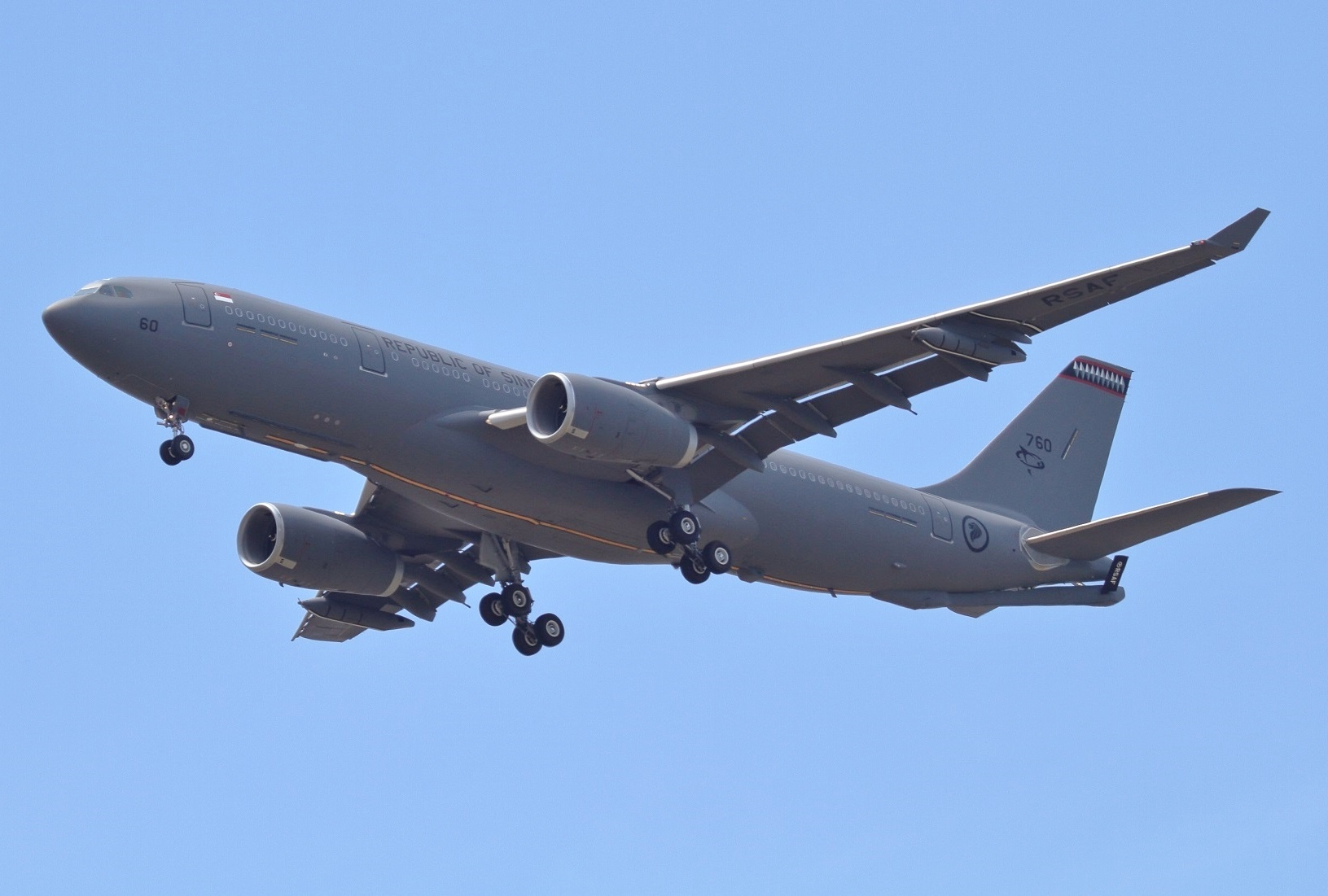
Airbus A330 MRTT

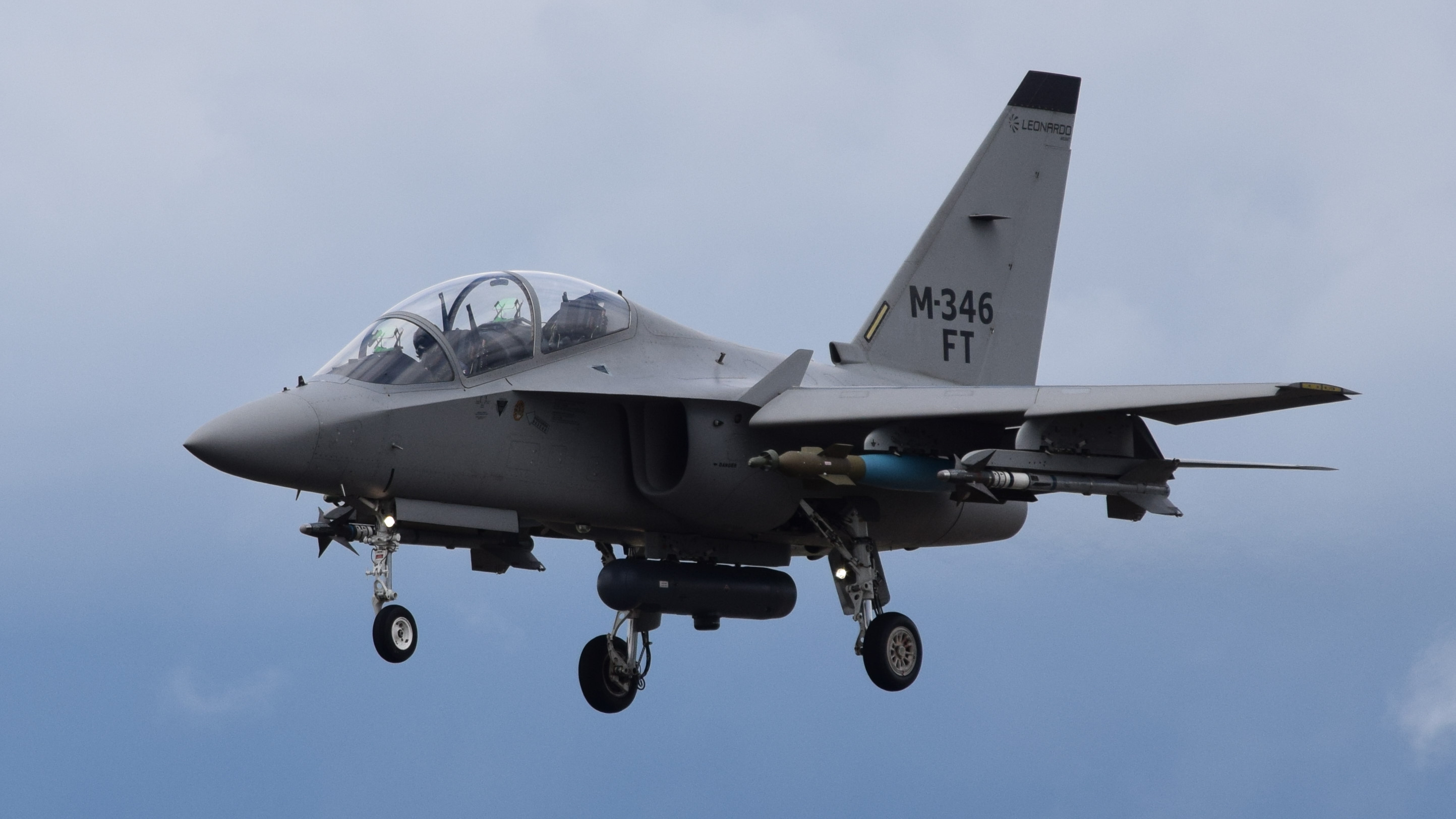
M-346 Master

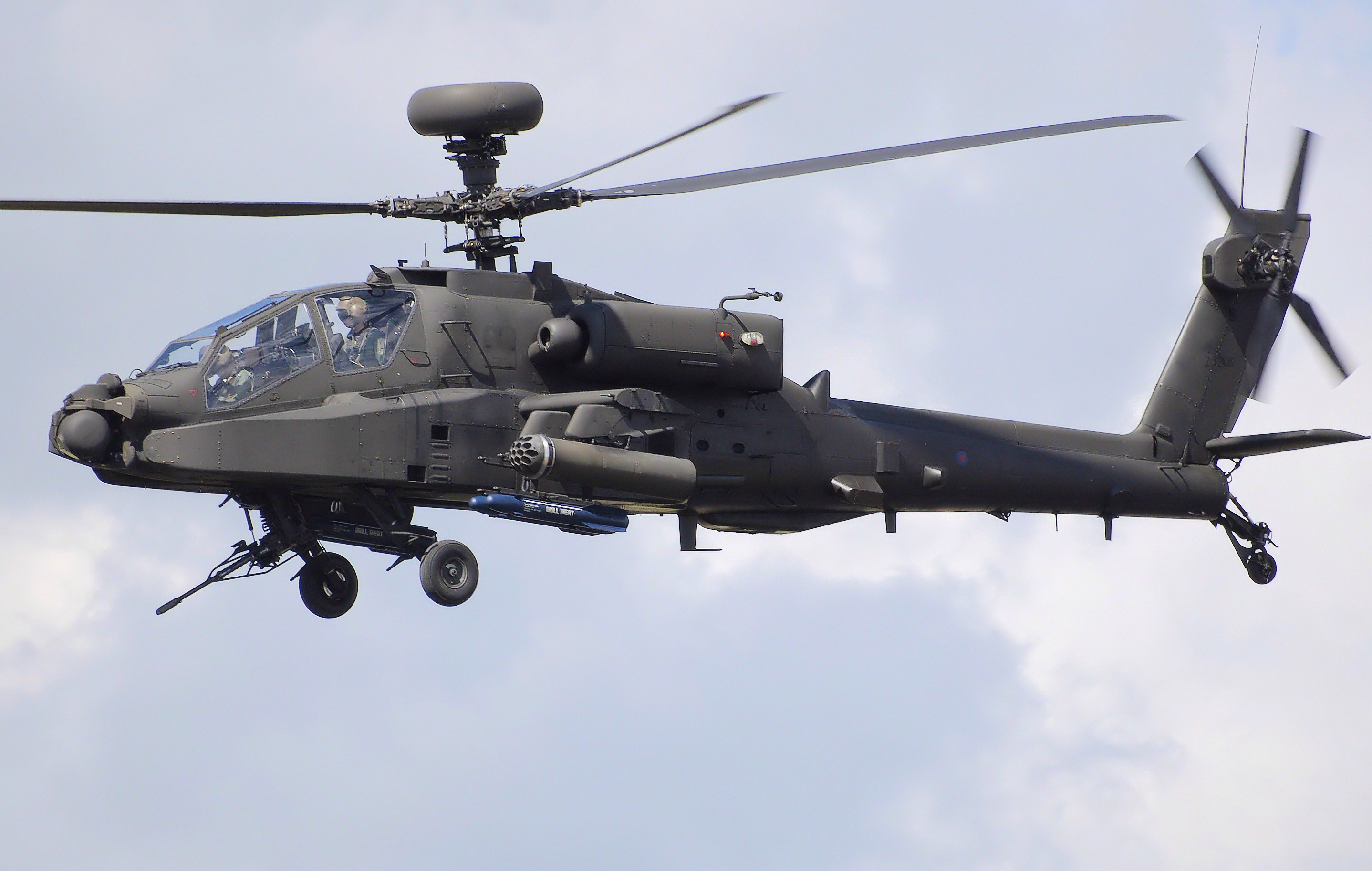
AH-64D Apache

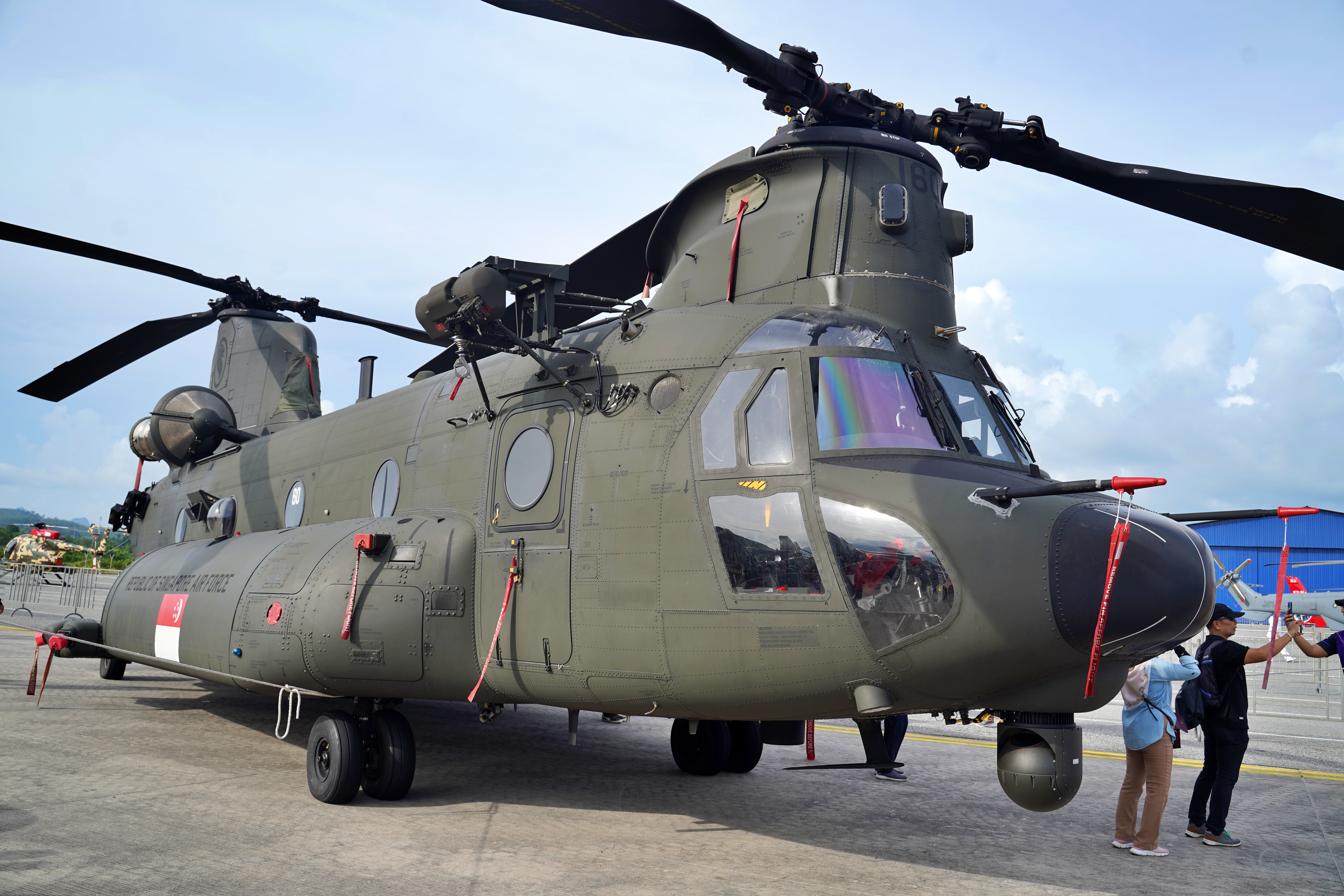
CH-47F Chinook

Aircraft	Origin	Role	Variant	In service	Notes
Combat aircraft
F-15E Strike Eagle	USA	Multirole, strike fighter	F-15SG	40	
F-16 Fighting Falcon	USA	Multirole fighter	F-16C / F-16D / F-16D+	59	Modernised as of 2023.
F-35 Lightning II	USA	Stealth swingrole fighter	F-35A	0 (+8 on order)	To be stationed in Singapore from 2029.
F-35 Lightning II	USA	Stealth swingrole fighter, V/STOL	F-35B	0 (+12 on order)	To be stationed in the USA from Q4 2026 (Ebbing Air National Guard Base).
Airborne early warning and control
Gulfstream G550 AEW	Israel / USA	AEW&C	EL/W-2085	4	
Maritime patrol
Boeing P-8 Poseidon	USA	ASW / MPA / Reconnaissance	P-8A	0 (+4 on order)	
Gulfstream G550	Israel / USA	MSA	G550-MSA	0 (+3 on order)	Aircraft supplied by Gulfstream, mission systems supplied by IAI / Elta Systems.
Fokker 50	Netherlands	MPA	Fokker-50 MPA	5	Replacement planned with: P-8A; G550-MSA
Tanker
Airbus A330 MRTT	Spain / France / Germany / UK	Aerial refueling / pallets transport	KC-30A	6	
Lockheed Martin KC-130 Hercules	USA	Aerial refueling / tactical transport	KC-130B	1	
Lockheed Martin KC-130 Hercules	USA	Aerial refueling / tactical transport	KC-130H	4	
Transport
Fokker 50	Netherlands	Tactical airlifter	Fokker-50 UTA	4	
Lockheed C-130	USA	Tactical airlifter	C-130H	5	
Helicopters
Boeing AH-64 Apache	USA	Attack helicopter	AH-64D	19	
Boeing CH-47 Chinook	USA	Heavy transport helicopter	CH-47SD	10	10 CH-47SD purchased in 1998. 16 CH-47F ordered in 2015 to replace the CH-47D (10 CH-47F based in Australia, 6 in Singapore).
Boeing CH-47 Chinook	USA	Heavy transport helicopter	CH-47F	16	10 CH-47SD purchased in 1998. 16 CH-47F ordered in 2015 to replace the CH-47D (10 CH-47F based in Australia, 6 in Singapore).
Airbus Helicopters H225M	France	Transport / utility helicopter	–	16	Successor of the AS332M Super Puma.
Sikorsky SH-60 Seahawk	USA	Naval helicopters / ASW / SAR	S-70B	8	
Trainer
Alenia Aermacchi M-346 Master	Italy	LIFT	–	12	Aircraft based in Cazaux (France) where the pilots are trained.
Pilatus PC-21	Switzerland	Basic trainer / advanced training	–	19	
Eurocopter EC120	France	Trainer helicopter	–	4	Used in 2026 in a special operations role as well.
Unmanned aerial vehicles
Elbit Hermes 900	Israel	Fixed-wing, MALE UAS; ISTAR	–	N/A	Successor of the Elbit Hermes 450. Estimated quantity: 12.
Elbit Hermes 450	Israel	Fixed-wing, MALE UAS; ISTAR	–	N/A	Acquired in May 2007, full operational capacity reached in 2015. Being replaced by the Hermes 900.
IAI Heron 1	Israel	Fixed-wing, MALE UAS; ISTAR	Heron 1	N/A	Purchased in 2011 to replace the Searcher UAV.
Aeronautics Defense; Orbiter	Israel	Fixed-wing, mini UAS; ISTAR	Orbiter 4	N/A	Purchased in 2022.

=== Retired aircraft ===
Previous aircraft operated by the RSAF consisted of the Northrop Grumman E-2 Hawkeye, Hawker Hunter F.74S, BAC Strikemaster Mk.84, BAC Jet Provost T.52A, Lockheed T-33A, A-4S Skyhawk, A-4SU Super Skyhawk, Northrop F-5S, S.211, Eurocopter AS332 Super Puma, Aérospatiale Alouette III, Bell 212, Bell UH-1H/B, the Aérospatiale AS350, Eurocopter Fennec helicopter, Cessna 172K, Short Skyvan, SIAI-Marchetti SF.260, and the Boeing KC-135.

Previous drone fleet of the RSAF included the Tadiran Mastiff, IAI Scout and IAI Searcher.

== Equipment ==
=== Armament ===
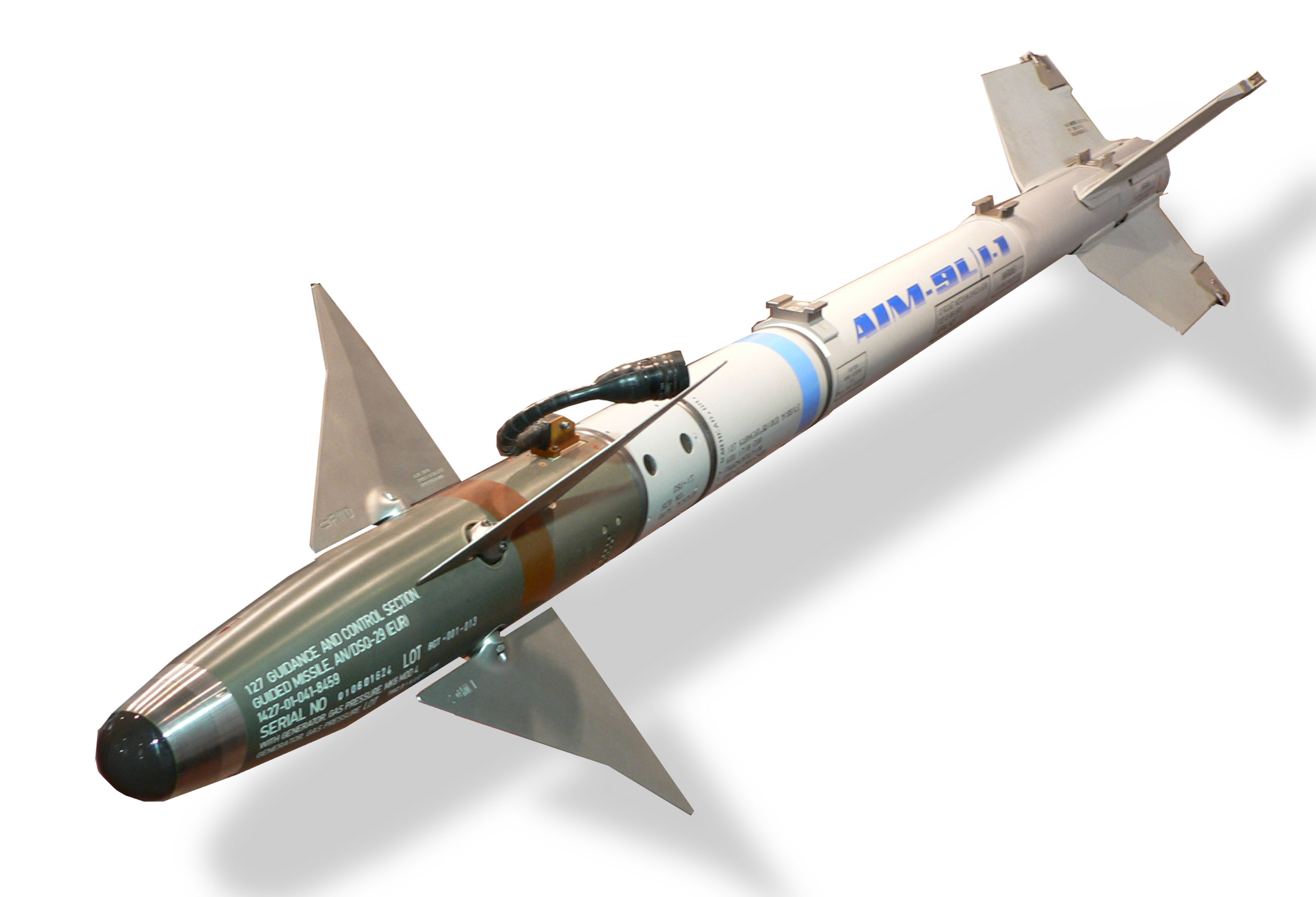
AIM 9 Sidewinder

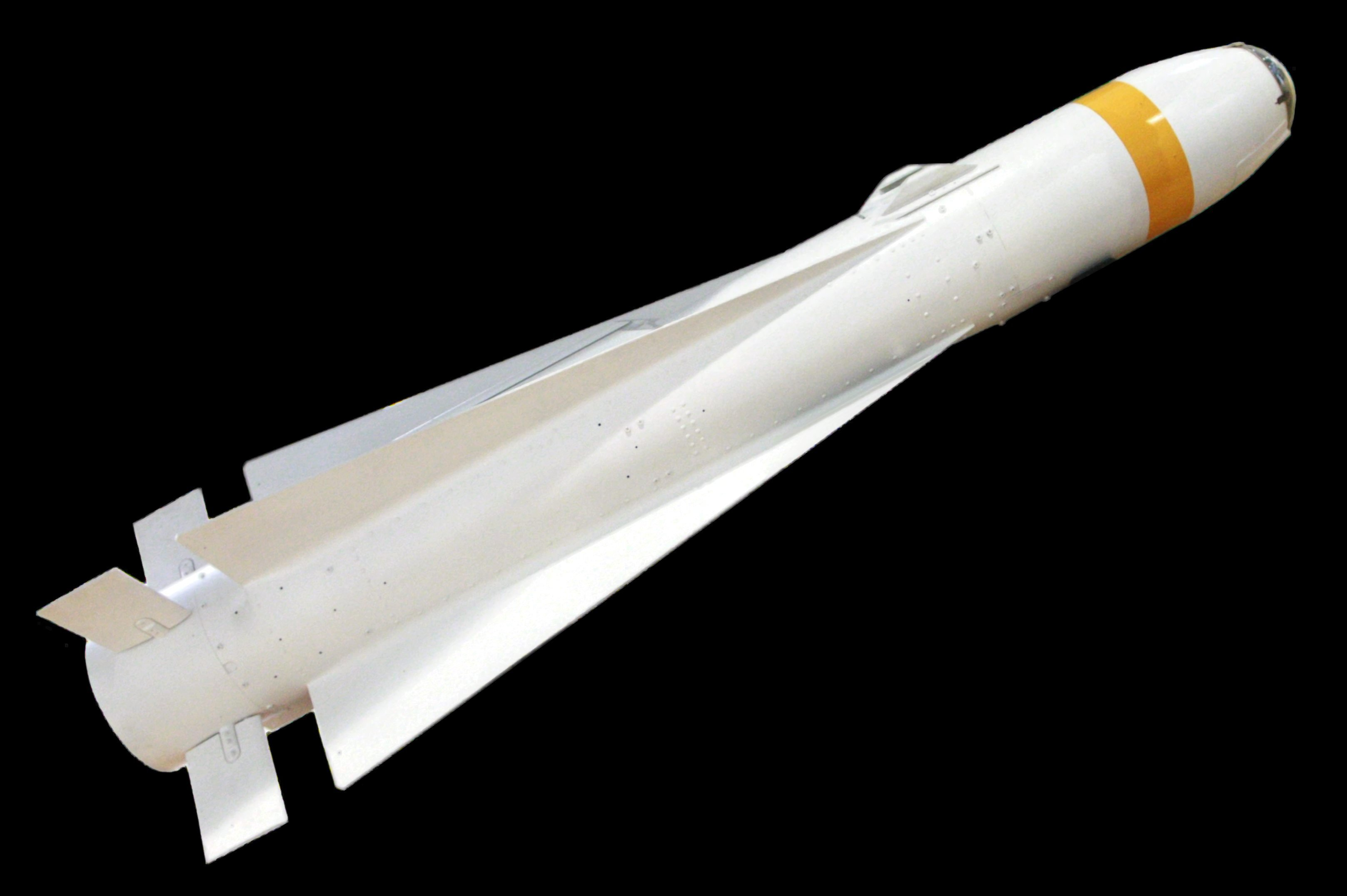
AGM-65 Maverick

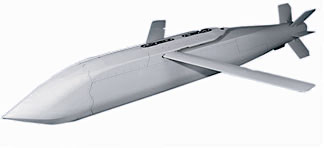
AGM-154 JSOW

Model	Origin	Type	Notes
Air-to-air missile
AIM-120C-5/C-7/C-8 AMRAAM	United States	Beyond-visual-range missile	604 missiles obtained
AIM-9J/P/S Sidewinder	United States	AAM	400 / 264 / 96
AIM-9X Sidewinder	United States	AAM	200 missiles obtained
AIM-7 Sparrow	United States	AAM	400 missiles obtained
RAFAEL Python 4	Israel	AAM	600 missiles obtained
RAFAEL Python 5	Israel	AAM	unknown
Air-to-surface missile / bombs
GBU-10/GBU-12/GBU-49/GBU-50	United States	Laser-guided bomb	68 / 140
CBU-105	United States	Unguided bomb	Unknown
GBU-38/B JDAM	United States	GPS / INS guided bomb	700
GBU-39/B	United States	Precision-guided glide bomb	20 (pending delivery)
GBU-54/B LJDAM	United States	Air to ground	Unknown
AGM-65B/D/G Maverick	United States	Air to ground	350
BGM-71 TOW	United States	Anti-armour	500
AGM-114 Hellfire	United States	Anti-armour	192
AGM-154A-1/C JSOW	United States	Air to ground	214
Anti-ship missile
AGM-84 Harpoon	United States		44 missiles obtained

=== Air defence ===
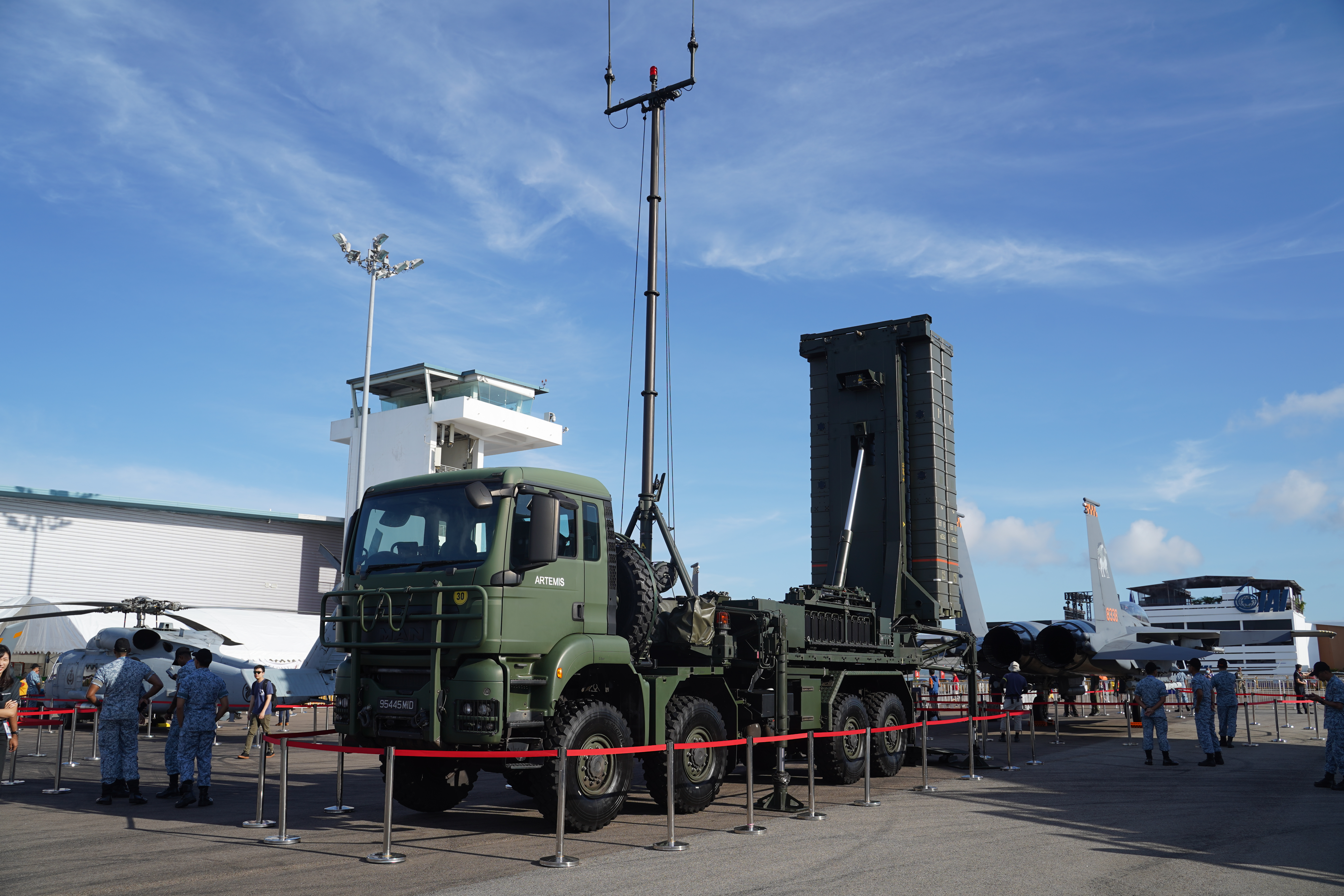
SAMP/T of the Republic of Singapore Air Force

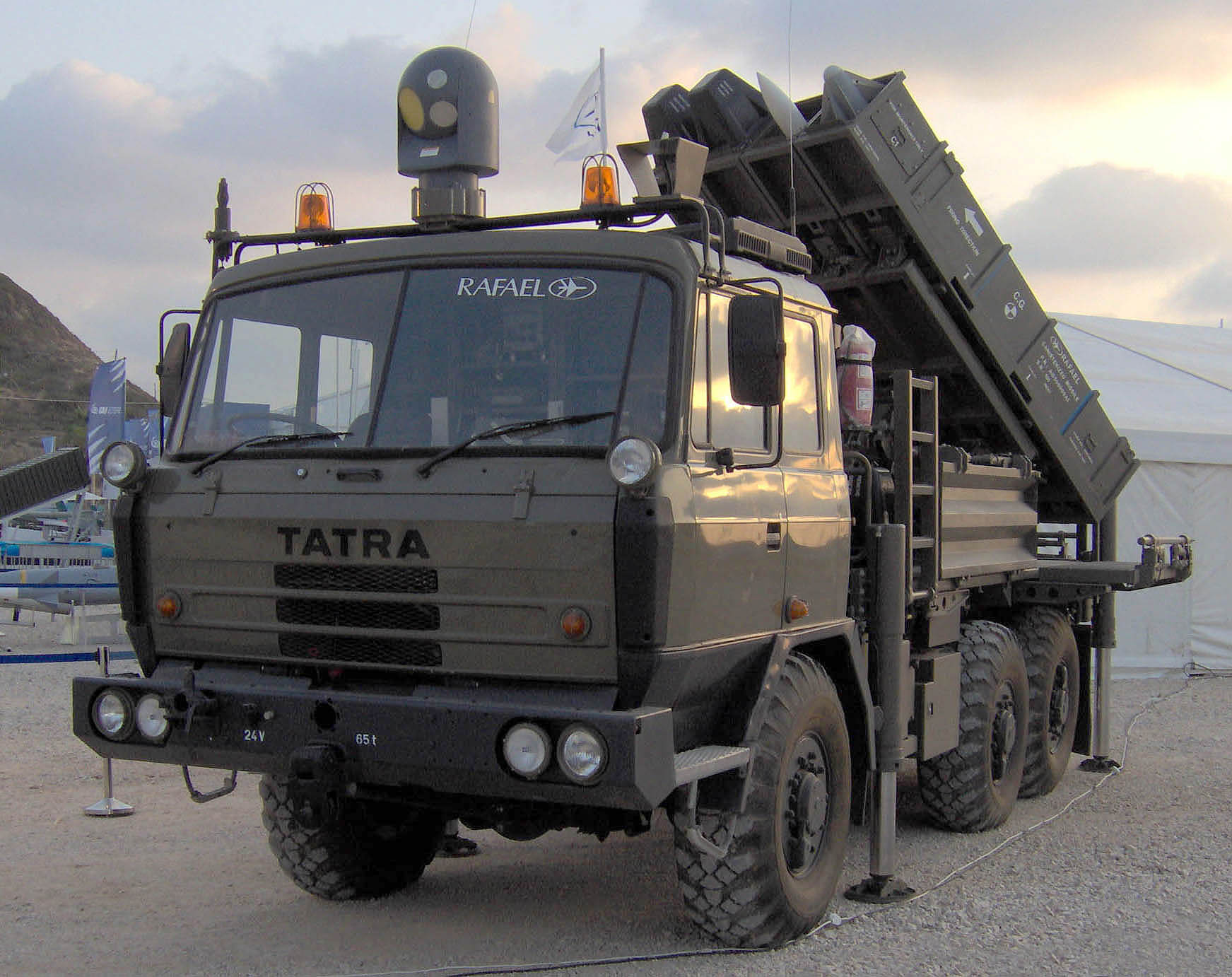
Rafael SPYDER

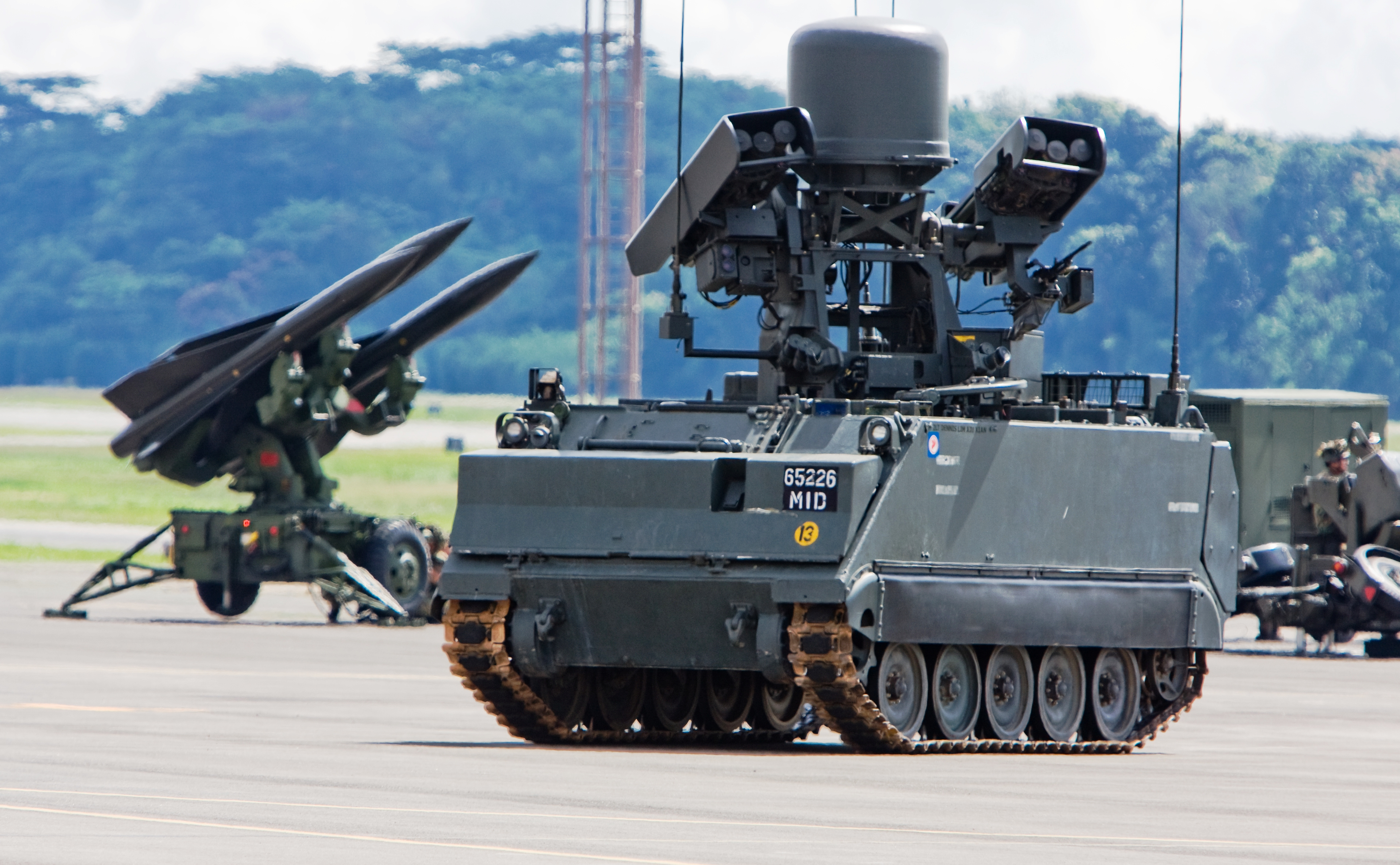
M113A2 Ultra Mechanised Igla (front) and MIM-23 Hawk (back)

==== Air defence systems ====
Model	Origin	Type	In service	Notes
SAM
SAMP/T	France / Italy	SAM system	12 launchers	SAMP/T battery includes a command and control vehicle, Arabel radar, and up to six launchers, each with eight missiles
Rafael SPYDER	Israel	SAM system	12 launchers	75 Python-5 / 75 Derby missiles
MIM-23 Hawk	United States	SAM system	4 systems	Being replaced by SAMP/T
Mechanised Igla	United States / USSR	SAM system	300 missiles	Six ready-to-fire Soviet Igla SAMs configured for short-range air defense (SHORAD) with some equipped with an advanced fire-control radar installed on M113A2
MANPADS & AA Guns
MBDA Mistral	France	MANPADS	600 missiles	
RBS 70	Sweden	MANPADS	500 missiles	
9K38 Igla	USSR	MANPADS	350 missiles	
Oerlikon 35 mm twin cannon	Switzerland	Towed anti-aircraft gun	34	

==== Air surveillance systems ====
Radar systems consist of one Lockheed Martin AN/FPS-117 unit, and a six Giraffe radar’s from Ericsson telecommunications.

Model	Origin	Type	In service	Notes
Radars
Lockheed Martin AN/FPS-117	United States	Air search radar system	1	
Lockheed Martin P-STAR	United States		20	
Thales-Raytheon Groundmaster 200	France / United States			
Ericsson GIRAFFE-S/AMB	Sweden		6	
Elta Systems EL/M-2084	Israel		4	
Tethered Aerostat Radar System	United States	Airborne ground surveillance system	2	

== Bases ==
Base	Location	Unit(s)
Changi Air Base	Changi	HQ Air Combat Command (HQ ACC); HQ Air Surveillance and Control Group (HQ ASCG); 112 Squadron (112 SQN); 121 Squadron (121 SQN); 202 Squadron (202 SQN); 203 Squadron (203 SQN); 208 Squadron (208 SQN); 508 Squadron (508 SQN); 608 Squadron (608 SQN); 708 Squadron (708 SQN); 808 Squadron (808 SQN)
Chong Pang Camp	Yishun	HQ Participation Command (HQ PC); HQ 9 Air Engineering and Logistics Group (HQ 9 AELG); HQ Air Defence Group (HQ ADG); Motor Transport Company (DAG MTC); 3 Divisional Air Defence Artillery (3 DA BN); 6 Divisional Air Defence Artillery (6 DA BN); 9 Divisional Air Defence Artillery (9 DA BN); 18 Divisional Air Defence Artillery (18 DA BN); 105 Squadron (105 SQN); 165 Squadron (165 SQN); 809 Squadron (809 SQN); 819 Squadron (819 SQN); 1 Medical Squadron (1 MS)
Murai Camp	Western Water Catchment	119 Squadron (119 SQN); 128 Squadron (128 SQN)
Paya Lebar Air Base	Paya Lebar	HQ Air Power Generation Command (HQ APGC); 113 Squadron (113 SQN); 122 Squadron (122 SQN); 142 Squadron (142 SQN); 149 Squadron (149 SQN); 207 Squadron (207 SQN); 507 Squadron (507 SQN); 607 Squadron (607 SQN); 707 Squadron (707 SQN); 807 Squadron (807 SQN); 817 Squadron (817 SQN)
Sembawang Air Base	Yishun	120 Squadron (120 SQN); 123 Squadron (123 SQN); 125 Squadron (125 SQN); 126 Squadron (126 SQN); 127 Squadron (127 SQN); 206 Squadron (206 SQN); 506 Squadron (506 SQN); 606 Squadron (606 SQN); 706 Squadron (706 SQN); 806 Squadron (806 SQN); 816 Squadron (816 SQN)
Seletar Airport	Seletar	124 Squadron (124 SQN)
Tengah Air Base	Tengah	HQ Unmanned Aerial Vehicle Command (HQ UC); HQ 1 Air Engineering and Logistics Group (HQ 1 AELG); 111 Squadron (111 SQN); 140 Squadron (140 SQN); 143 Squadron (143 SQN); 145 Squadron (145 SQN); 205 Squadron (205 SQN); 505 Squadron (505 SQN); 605 Squadron (605 SQN); 705 Squadron (705 SQN); 805 Squadron (805 SQN); 815 Squadron (815 SQN); RSAF Black Knights
Bukit Gombak Camp	Bukit Batok	HQ Air Defence and Operations Command (HQ ADOC)
Lim Chu Kang Camp 2	Western Water Catchment	160 Squadron (160 SQN); 163 Squadron (163 SQN); Motor Transport Company (ADG MTC)
Choa Chu Kang Camp	Western Water Catchment	201 Squadron (201 SQN)

== Others ==
=== RSAF Black Knights ===
First formed in 1973 at Tengah Air Base, the Black Knights is RSAF's official aerobatic team and has been performing on an ad hoc basis since its inception, with volunteer pilots drawn from various front line squadrons within the RSAF. The aerobatics team has performed on events including the Singapore Airshow 2014.

=== RSAF Museum ===
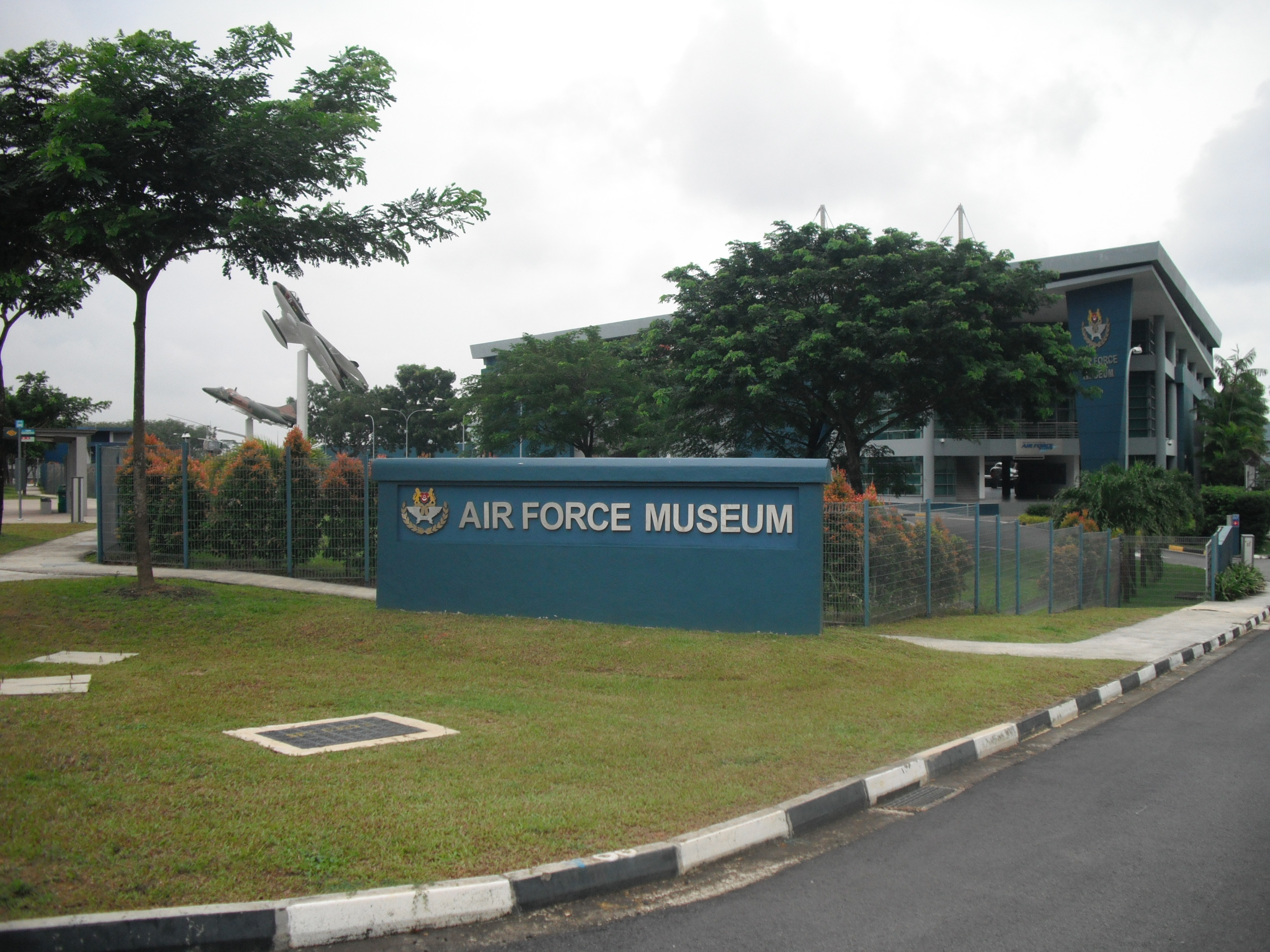
The RSAF Museum

The RSAF maintains the Air Force Museum, which was first located at Changi Air Base before it was relocated to a purpose-built building currently situated at 400 Airport Road, Singapore 534234 adjacent to Paya Lebar Air Base. The museum is open to the public and showcases the air force's history and capabilities. Exhibits include the Northrop Grumman E-2 Hawkeye and numerous A-4SU Super Skyhawk.

=== Tertiary institutions ===
The Republic of Singapore Air Force has loaned several aircraft, and aircraft parts to the tertiary institutions in Singapore, including Institute of Technical Education, Ngee Ann Polytechnic, Singapore Polytechnic, Nanyang Polytechnic and Nanyang Technological University since 2005. Aircraft includes the A-4SU Super Skyhawk and AS332 Super Puma.

== Past symbols ==
=== Roundel ===
1968–1973

1973–1990

=== Ensign ===
1968–1973

1973–1990

== See also ==
- List of Republic of Singapore Air Force squadrons
- Singapore Wing, Malayan Auxiliary Air Force
