= Lim Kim Choon =

Singaporean civil servant and former air force general

Lim Kim Choon PPA(E) PPA(P)
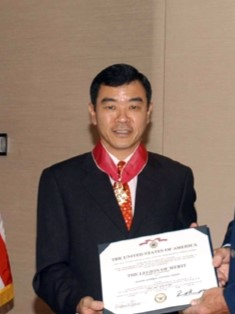
- Lim in 2006
- Native name: 林金春
- Born: 1958 (age 67–68); Colony of Singapore
- Allegiance: Singapore
- Branch: Republic of Singapore Air Force
- Service years: 1976–2006
- Rank: Major-General
- Commands: Chief of Air Force; Chief of Staff (Air Staff); Deputy Commander, Tengah Air Base; Commander, Tengah Air Base; Head, Air Operations Department; Head, Air Intelligence Department
- Awards: See awards and decorations
- Alma mater: Massachusetts Institute of Technology (MS); Loughborough University (BS); Raffles Institution

Lim Kim Choon PPA(E) PPA(P) (Chinese: 林金春; pinyin: Lín Jīnchūn) is a Singaporean former civil servant and former major-general who served as Chief of Air Force between 2001 and 2006.

== Education ==
Lim studied at Raffles Institution, and was awarded the Singapore Armed Forces Overseas Scholarship in 1977 to study production engineering at Loughborough University, where he obtained a Bachelor of Science. He also holds a Master of Science in management from the Massachusetts Institute of Technology.

He also attended the Air Command and Staff Course at the Air Command and Staff College, and a six-week Advanced Management Program in Harvard Business School in 2009.

== Military career ==
Lim enlisted in the Singapore Armed Forces in December 1976 and served in the Republic of Singapore Air Force (RSAF) as an F-16 pilot. Throughout his military career, he held various appointments, including: Head, Air Intelligence Department; Head, Air Operations Department; Deputy Commander, Tengah Air Base; Commander, Tengah Air Base; Chief of Staff (Air Staff).

He was appointed as the Chief of Air Force on 1 April 2001, succeeding Raymund Ng. During his tenure as Chief, the RSAF acquired various new systems, such as the F-15SG, AH-64D Apache Longbow and SH-60 Seahawk.

Lim also directed the RSAF in humanitarian assistance operations, such as Operation Flying Eagle in Aceh, Indonesia in 2005 and Singapore's response in the aftermath of Hurricane Katrina in 2005.

On 1 July 2002, Lim was promoted from the rank brigadier-general to major-general.

Lim retired on 24 March 2006 and was succeeded by Ng Chee Khern as the Chief of Air Force.

== Post-military career ==
Lim joined the Civil Aviation Authority of Singapore on 2 May 2006 and was appointed as the director-general on 1 July 2007, before stepping down from the position on 1 July 2009.

== Awards and decorations ==
- Public Administration Medal (Military) (Gold), in 2003.
- Public Administration Medal (Military) (Silver), in 1996.
- Long Service Medal (Military), in 2002.
- Singapore Armed Forces Long Service and Good Conduct (20 Years) Medal
- Singapore Armed Forces Long Service and Good Conduct (10 Years) Medal with 15 year clasp
- Singapore Armed Forces Good Service Medal
- Legion D'Honneur (Commandeur), in 2004.
- Bintang Swa Bhuwana Paksa Utama (1st Class), in 2005.
- Commander of the Legion of Merit, in 2006.

Military offices
Preceded by Major-General Raymund Ng Teck Heng	Chief of the Republic of Singapore Air Force; 1 April 2001 – 24 March 2006	Succeeded by Brigadier-General Ng Chee Khern
