= Raymund Ng =

Singaporean former air force general

Raymund Ng Teck Heng PPA(E) PPA(P)
- Born: November 1956 (age 69); Colony of Singapore
- Allegiance: Singapore
- Branch: Republic of Singapore Air Force
- Service years: 1974–2001
- Rank: Major-General
- Commands: Chief of Air Force; Chief of Staff (Air Staff); Commander, Tengah Air Base; Head, Air Operations Department; Head, Joint Operations Department
- Awards: See awards and decorations
- Alma mater: Imperial College (MBA); University of Manchester (BS); National Junior College; St. Gabriel's Secondary School

Chinese name
- Traditional Chinese: 黃德興
- Simplified Chinese: 黄德兴
Transcriptions
Standard Mandarin
- Hanyu Pinyin: Huáng Déxīng
- IPA: [xwǎŋ.tɤ̌.ɕíŋ]

Raymund Ng Teck Heng (Note: Chinese: see Chinese name and romanisations) PPA(E) PPA(P) is a Singaporean former major-general who served as Chief of Air Force from 1998 to 2001.

== Education ==
Raymund Ng Teck Heng attended St. Gabriel's Secondary School and National Junior College. During this period, Ng also obtained a private pilot licence from the Singapore Youth Flying Club.

In 1977, Ng was awarded the Singapore Armed Forces Overseas Merit Scholarship to study aeronautical engineering at the University of Manchester and obtained a Bachelor of Science. He also obtained a Master of Business Administration from Imperial College London in 1993.

== Military career ==
Ng enlisted in the Singapore Armed Forces in December 1974, and served as a fighter pilot in the Republic of Singapore Air Force. During his career in the military, Ng has held the appointments of Head, Joint Plans Department; Head, Air Operations Department; Commander, Tengah Air Base; and Chief of Staff (Air Staff).

Ng was promoted from the rank of colonel to brigadier-general on 1 July 1997, and to the rank of major-general on 30 June 1999.

Ng succeeded Goh Yong Siang as the Chief of Air Force on 1 July 1998 and stepped down on 1 April 2001. He was succeeded by Lim Kim Choon.

== Post-military career ==
On 1 July 2001, Ng joined Singapore Airlines as Senior Vice President (Flight Operations Projects).

In the aftermath of the Singapore Airlines Flight 006 accident, Ng signed off on the termination of the captain and the first officer on 26 July 2002, with the International Federation of Air Line Pilots' Associations calling the action as "unjust, unwarranted and unreasonable".

Ng left the position on 31 January 2006.

== Awards and decorations ==
- Public Administration Medal (Military) (Gold), in 1999.
- Public Administration Medal (Military) (Silver), in 1995.
- Singapore Armed Forces Long Service and Good Conduct (20 Years) Medal
- Singapore Armed Forces Long Service and Good Conduct (10 Years) Medal
- Singapore Armed Forces Good Service Medal
- Commander of the Legion of Merit

== Notes ==
Military offices
Preceded by Major-General Goh Yong Siang	Chief of the Republic of Singapore Air Force; 1 July 1998 – 1 April 2001	Succeeded by Brigadier-General Lim Kim Choon
