= 142 Squadron, Republic of Singapore Air Force =

Republic of Singapore Air Force fighter unit

RSAF 142 Squadron
- Active: 1974-2005, 2016-present
- Role: Fighter-bomber
- Garrison/HQ: Paya Lebar Air Base
- Mottos: "Honour and Glory"
- Equipment: F-15SG Strike Eagle

Insignia
- Identification symbol: Gryphon

The 142 Squadron "Gryphon" of the Republic of Singapore Air Force is a fighter-bomber squadron based at Paya Lebar Air Base, the squadron goes by the motto "Honour and Glory" with the Gryphon adopted as its mascot. According to IHS Janes, it is the second Singapore-based F-15SG Squadron.

== History ==
Formerly based in Tengah Air Base, 142 SQN was RSAF's first A-4 squadron and also the last to fly the upgraded A-4SU Super Skyhawk in 2005. 142 SQN was RSAF Operational Conversion Unit (OCU) for the A-4 as well as serving air to ground attack roles. The unit shares a similar motto to the Singapore Armed Forces Commando Formation. The squadron was disbanded after the retirement of A-4SUs in RSAF fleet and it was stood up again in 2016 as the fleet size of F-15SGs grew.

Currently, 142 Squadron is based at Paya Lebar Air Base as the second squadron operating F-15SG Strike Eagles, alongside the current 149 Squadron which is also based there.

In 2022, 142 Squadron hosted and trained with No. 75 Squadron RAAF's F-35 Lightning II stealth fighters and gained more insights into future F-35 operations.

== Information ==
The tail is adorned with an orange checkered tailband. The squadron's logo is centered with the serial number on the base of the tail.

== Achievements ==
The unit won the Best Fighter Squadron once in 2001 whilst operating the A-4SU and in 2019, 2024, and 2025 - operating the F-15SG Strike Eagle.

== Aircraft operated ==
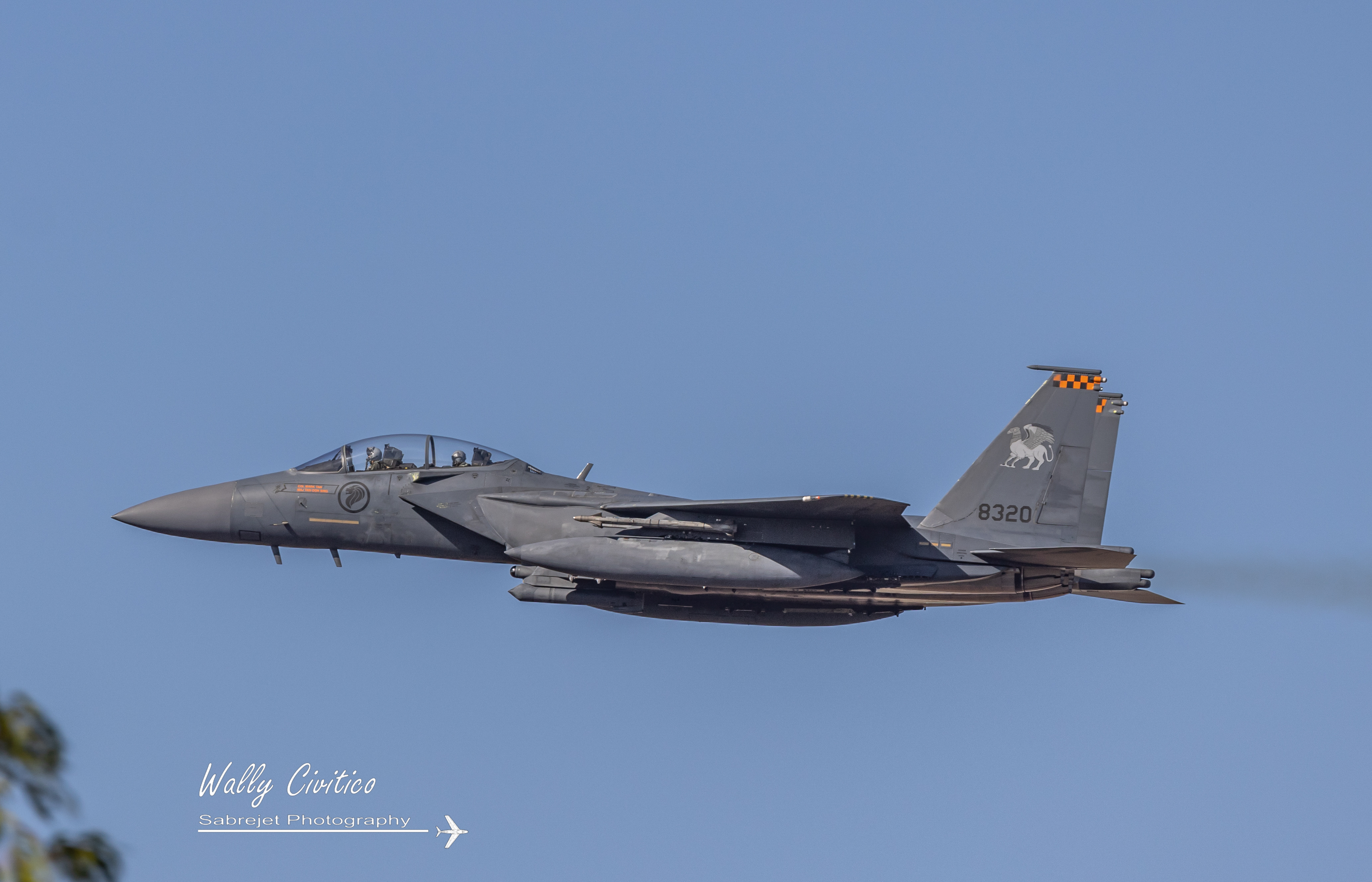
An F-15SG of 142 squadron

1. 18 T/A-4SU Super Skyhawks (Fighter-bomber, 1974–2005)
2. 15 F-15SG Strike Eagles (2016–present)
