= Goh Yong Siang =

Singaporean former air force general

Goh Yong Siang PPA(E)
- Born: December 1951 (age 74); Colony of Singapore
- Allegiance: Singapore
- Branch: Republic of Singapore Air Force
- Service years: 1969–1998
- Rank: Major-General
- Commands: Chief of Air Force; Chief of Staff (Air Staff); Commander, Paya Lebar Air Base; Director, Joint Operations and Planning Directorate; Head, Air Operations Department; 140 Squadron Commander
- Awards: See awards and decorations
- Education: National University of Singapore (BA)

Chinese name
- Traditional Chinese: 吳榮祥
- Simplified Chinese: 吴荣祥
Transcriptions
Standard Mandarin
- Hanyu Pinyin: Wú Róngxiáng
- IPA: [ǔ.ɻʊ̌ŋ.ɕjǎŋ]

Goh Yong Siang (Note: Chinese: see Chinese name and romanisations) PPA(E) is a Singaporean former major-general who served as Chief of Air Force from 1995 to 1998.

== Education ==
Goh Yong Siang attended the National University of Singapore and obtained a Bachelor of Arts. He also attended the Advanced Management Programme at Harvard Business School and the Leaders in Administration Programme at Civil Service College Singapore.

== Military career ==
Goh enlisted in the Singapore Armed Forces in 1969, and served as a pilot in the Republic of Singapore Air Force, operating the Hawker Hunter, Northrop F-5E, and General Dynamics F-16 Fighting Falcon.

During his career in the military, Goh has held the appointments of 140 Squadron Commander; Commander, Paya Lebar Air Base; Head Air Operations Department; Director, Joint Operations and Planning Directorate; and Chief of Staff (Air Staff).

On 1 July 1995, Goh succeeded Bey Soo Khiang as the Chief of Air Force. Under his leadership, the RSAF expanded training with other air forces and in overseas detachment, such as the establishment of the S$52 million Flying Training School located in RAAF Base Pearce, and the inauguration of the RSAF Peace Prairie Detachment in Grand Prairie Armed Forces Reserve Complex.

Goh was promoted from the rank of colonel to brigadier-general on 1 July 1994, and to the rank of major-general on 1 July 1996.

During his military career, Goh also served as board directors for Singapore Technologies Industrial Corp (STIC, now known as SembCorp), Singapore Shipbuilding and Engineering (precursor of ST Marine), and ST Aerospace.

Goh stepped down on 30 June 1998 and was succeeded by Raymund Ng.

== Post-military career ==
On 8 July 1998, Goh joined STIC as the executive director.

From 2006 to 2013, Goh was a senior managing director of international and strategic relations at Temasek International. Currently, Goh is a director of Temasek Management Services Pte. Ltd., a wholly owned subsidiary of Temasek.

== Personal life ==
Goh was accused of colliding with a stroller while driving in May 2024. His vehicle allegedly hit a woman pushing a stroller and causing hurt to a two-year-old boy. He was charged with causing greivous hurt on 15 April 2026. He was fined S$5,000 and banned from driving for five years.

== Awards and decorations ==
- Public Administration Medal (Military) (Gold)
- Singapore Armed Forces Long Service and Good Conduct (20 Years) Medal
- Singapore Armed Forces Long Service and Good Conduct (10 Years) Medal
- Singapore Armed Forces Good Service Medal
- Légion d'honneur (Commandeur)
- Knight Grand Cross of the Most Noble Order of the Crown
- Order of the Cloud and Banner with Yellow Grand Cordon

== Notes ==
Military offices
| Preceded by Major-General Bey Soo Khiang | Chief of the Republic of Singapore Air Force; 1 July 1995 – 30 June 1998 | Succeeded by Brigadier-General Raymund Ng |
