= Michael Teo Eng Cheng =

Singaporean former diplomat and air force general

Michael Teo Eng Cheng PPA(E)
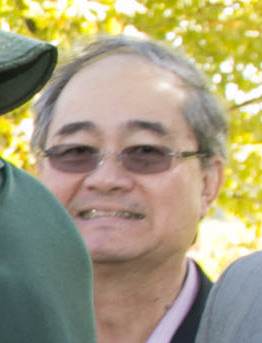
- Teo in 2014
- Born: 1948 (age 77–78); Malayan Union
- Alma mater: Tufts University (MA); Auburn University (BS)
- Military career
- Allegiance: Singapore
- Branch: Republic of Singapore Air Force
- Service years: 1968–1992
- Rank: Brigadier-General
- Commands: Chief of Air Force; Commander, Republic of Singapore Air Force
- Awards: See awards and decorations

Chinese name
- Traditional Chinese: 張榮清
- Simplified Chinese: 张荣清
Transcriptions
Standard Mandarin
- Hanyu Pinyin: Zhāng Róngqīng
- IPA: [ʈʂáŋ.ɻʊ̌ŋ.tɕʰíŋ]

Michael Teo Eng Cheng (Note: Chinese: see Chinese name and romanisations) PPA(E) is a Singaporean former diplomat and brigadier-general who served as Commander of the Republic of Singapore Air Force (RSAF) from 1985 to 1990, and Chief of Air Force from 1990 to 1992.

== Education ==
Michael Teo Eng Cheng attended Auburn University and graduated with a Bachelor of Science in business administration in 1984. In August 1992, after stepping down as Chief of Air Force, Teo began studying at Tufts University, and graduated with a Master of Arts in international relations in 1993.

== Military career ==
Teo enlisted in the Singapore Armed Forces in June 1968, and served as a fighter pilot in the Republic of Singapore Air Force, operating the Northrop F-5E. During his career in the military, Teo has also held the appointments of squadron commander and Head, Air Operations Department.

Teo was promoted from the rank of colonel to brigadier-general on 1 July 1987.

Teo was appointed as the first Commander of RSAF from 1 November 1985 to 31 April 1990, and later as the first Chief of Air Force on 1 May 1990. Under his leadership, the RSAF acquired eight new General Dynamics F-16 Fighting Falcon, operationalised the 145 Squadron with 20 ST Aerospace A-4SU Super Skyhawk, and equipped the island with air defence systems.

On 31 August 1992, Teo stepped down, and was succeeded by Bey Soo Khiang.

== Diplomacy career ==
In August 1993, Teo joined the Ministry of Foreign Affairs, and was appointed as the high commissioner-designate. On 12 February 1994, Teo was appointed as high commissioner to New Zealand, and stepped down in July 1996.

From August 1996 to December 2001, he was appointed as ambassador to the Republic of Korea, and concurrently served as the ambassador to Mongolia from April 1997 to December 2001.

On 21 January 2002, Teo was appointed as high commissioner to the United Kingdom, while concurrently serving as the ambassador to Ireland, before stepping down in July 2011.

From September 2011 to August 2014, Teo was appointed as high commissioner to Australia.

== Personal life ==
Teo is married to Joyce Ng and has two children.

== Awards and decorations ==
- Public Administration Medal (Military) (Gold), in 1989.
- Singapore Armed Forces Long Service and Good Conduct (20 Years) Medal
- Singapore Armed Forces Long Service and Good Conduct (10 Years) Medal
- Singapore Armed Forces Good Service Medal
- Knight Grand Cross of the Order of the Crown of Thailand, in 1990.
- Bintang Swa Bhuwana Paksa Utama (1st Class), in 1991.

== Notes ==
Military offices
New office	Chief of the Republic of Singapore Air Force; 1 May 1990 – 31 August 1992	Succeeded by Brigadier-General Bey Soo Khiang
