= Chong Pang Camp =

Military camp in Singapore

Coordinates: 1°25′55.75″N 103°49′30.95″E

Chong Pang Camp is located in the northern side of Singapore, within Sembawang Air Base and opposite Chong Pang City in Yishun. Established in 2002, the camp is operated by the Republic of Singapore Air Force (RSAF).

The camp houses elements from Air Defence Operations Command (HQ ADOC, 165 Squadron, 809 and 819 Squadrons and 9 Air Engineering and Logistics Group) and Participation Command (HQ PC, 3DA, 6/9 DA and 18 DA Battalions, 105 Squadron and 1 Medical Squadron).

The camp was originally known as the Air Defence Systems Division (ADSD) complex. There still exists a road sign along Sembawang Road with this name. The elements were then transferred to Air Defence Operations Command (ADOC) in early 2007, and later, 3 Battalions were transferred to Participation Command (PC) in August that year.
