= 143 Squadron, Republic of Singapore Air Force =

Republic of Singapore Air Force fighter unit

RSAF 143 Squadron
- Active: 1975-1997; 2000-2026
- Role: Multi-role fighter
- Garrison/HQ: Tengah Air Base
- Motto: "We Dare"
- Equipment: 16 F-16C/D Fighting Falcons

Insignia
- Identification symbol: A Phoenix stretching its wings.

143 Squadron "Phoenix" was a flying squadron of the Republic of Singapore Air Force, operating twelve F-16 Fighting Falcons. Based in Tengah Airbase, the squadron's motto is "We Dare".

== History ==
143 Squadron was formed on 15 February 1975 in Changi Air Base. Operations first started on 1 April 1975 with 9 A-4Bs and 13 pilots. The first Singaporean instructors and pilot were sent for training on the new aircraft to NAS Lemoore, California. They returned to Singapore in 1974 to form the nucleus of 2 new squadrons, namely No. 142 (Gryphon) and No. 143(Phoenix), with the latter actually being the first to achieve operational status in 1975.

The squadron moved to Tengah Air Base on 26 Aug 1975. On the 1st January 1976, 143 Squadron was nationalized with Cpt Ronald Lim Tze Chiow as the new commander taking over from Maj Kao Pi Ti, a Taiwanese expatriate.

The year 1989 was a memorable year for the Squadron as it became the first squadron to receive the re-engined A-4SU Skyhawks. On 1 March 1989, 143 Squadron was officially inaugurated as the first Super Skyhawk Squadron by BG (Res) Lee Hsien Loong. Later in the year, it won the Best Fighter Squadron.

The emblem of 143 Squadron was changed to a phoenix resting on the blunt edge of the sword on 1 March 1989. The bird on the new emblem is more aggressive-looking than the previous one, to match the improved capabilities of the skyhawk, and also to uphold the motto of the Phoenixians - "We Dare"!

In the following year, 143 Squadron had to honour to form the Black Knights aerobatics display team which made its debut performance at the Asian Aerospace 1990 under the CO then Teo Shi Onn. The squadron operated the A-4SUs until the squadron was deactivated momentarily in 1997.

The F16C/D Fighting Falcons were inaugurated into 143 SQN on 27 Oct 2000. The ceremony was officiated by RADM (NS) Teo Chee Hean, Minister for Education and 2nd Minister for Defence.

143 Squadron was decommissioned on 11 September 2026.

== Information ==
The squadron insignia is based on a mythical bird. A phoenix with only one of its kind, that after living five or six centuries in the Arabian Desert that rises from the ashes with renewed youth to live through another cycle.

This is especially true for 143 Squadron as it was deactivated in 1997, after flying the A-4 Skyhawks since 1974, and then re-activated in 2000 to fly the newly acquired F-16C/D Fighting Falcons.

The tail is adorned with a yellow & black checkered tailband. The squadron's logo is centered with the serial number on the base of the tail.

== Motto ==
The motto of the squadron, "We Dare" aptly describes the people in the Squadron as they face any challenge with boldness, courage and resilience, just like the Phoenix.

== Achievements ==
The squadron won the Best Fighter Squadron in the following years: 1989, 1990, 2017, 2020, 2021, 2022 and 2023.

The squadron accolades include
Top Gun II Champion 2022
Top Ace Champion 2021
Top Gun Champion 2020

The strong culture of excellence within the squadron, coupled with its psychologically safe environment, are amongst some of the key factors leading to its continuous success.

== Aircraft operated ==
1. 16× T/A-4SU Super Skyhawks (1975–1997)
2. 16× F-16C/D Fighting Falcons (2000–present)
