= Disbandment of the RNZAF air combat force =

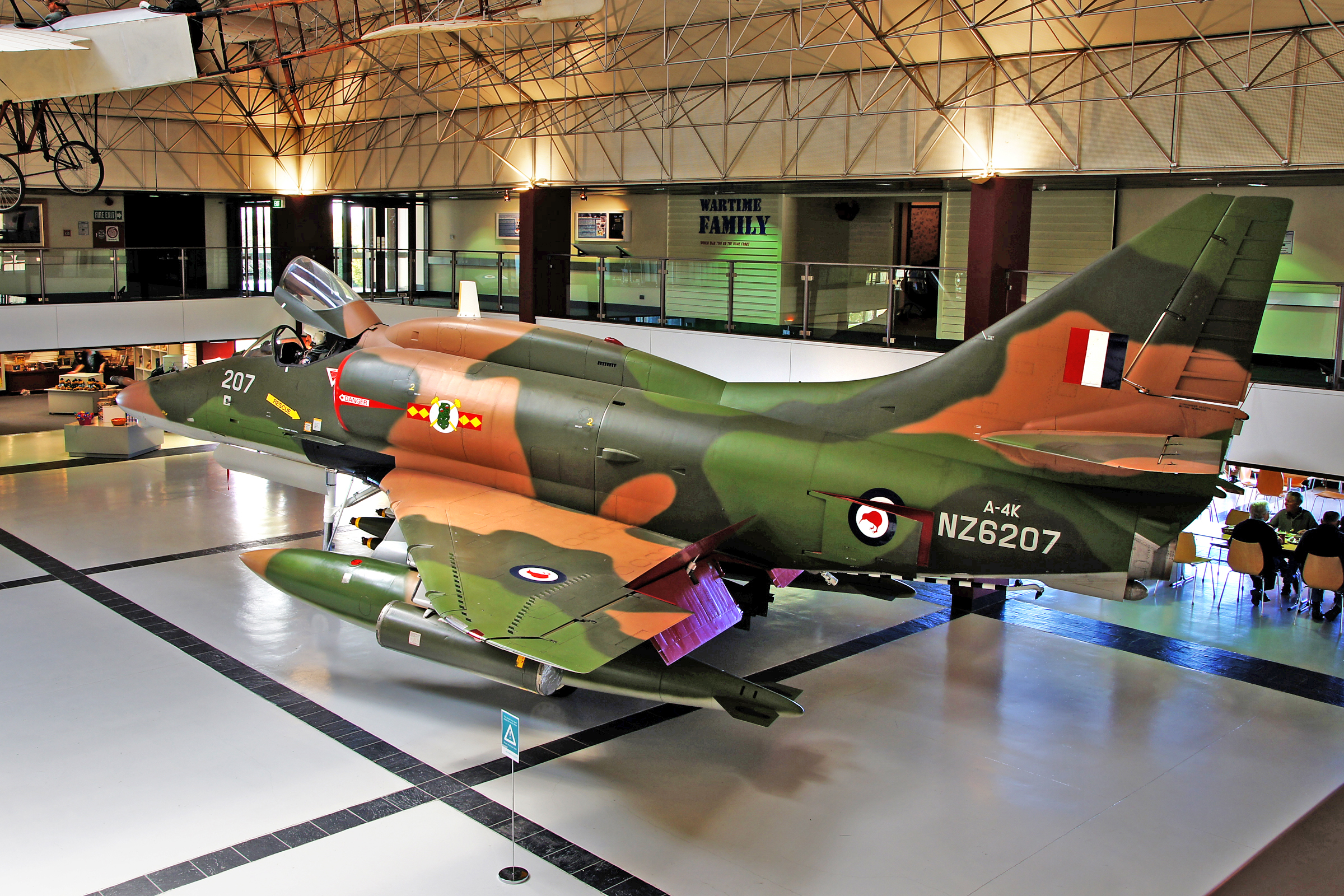
A former United States Navy A4 Skyhawk on loan to the RNZAF Museum. It is displayed in the early RNZAF Colour Scheme at the Air Force Museum of New Zealand

In May 2001 the Fifth Labour Government of New Zealand decided to disband the Royal New Zealand Air Force's air combat force by withdrawing its Douglas A-4K Skyhawk fighter aircraft and Aermacchi MB-339 trainers without replacement. This followed a debate over whether 28 General Dynamics F-16 A/B Fighting Falcon fighter aircraft should be leased from the United States to replace the Skyhawks. The RNZAF's air combat units were disbanded in October 2001, and many of the aircraft were eventually sold.

In November 1998, The National-led Coalition Government made the decision to lease 28 F-16 A/B fighter aircraft. The Labour Party opposition opposed this decision on the grounds that the funds would be better spent on the Army. Following Labour's victory in the 1999 New Zealand general election, the new government commissioned a review of the fighter lease. While the report recommended reducing the number of F-16s, the government decided instead to cancel the deal in February 2000. The air combat force was disbanded following further consideration, with the government stating that the funding this freed up would be reallocated to other elements of the New Zealand Defence Force.

The decision to disband the RNZAF's air combat force was controversial. The opposition National Party disagreed with the decision, as did many RNZAF personnel. Defence commentators' views differed, with some seeing the air combat force as being of little value while others feeling that New Zealand would be overly reliant on its allies, Australia in particular. Public opinion was also split, but a majority agreed with the decision.

== Background ==
=== Skyhawk Delivery ===
For over three decades, the Douglas A-4 Skyhawk served as New Zealand's primary combat aircraft. This decision, along with the purchase of the Bell 47 and Bell UH-1 Iroqouis helicopters and Lockheed P-3 Orion maritime patrol aircraft, reflected the closer strategic relationship with the United States and Australia in the 1960s. In April 1968, 14 were ordered at the cost of $24.65 million.

The 10 A-4K and 4 TA-4K aircraft arrived in Auckland aboard the USS Okinawa in May 1970. The delivery party was met with minor local opposition from anti-war protest groups who were concerned about New Zealand and its friendly relations with the United States in regards to the ongoing Vietnam War. The fact that the A-4 Skyhawk itself had been utilised extensively by the United States during the war was a particular point of concern among protestors.

=== Project Kahu ===
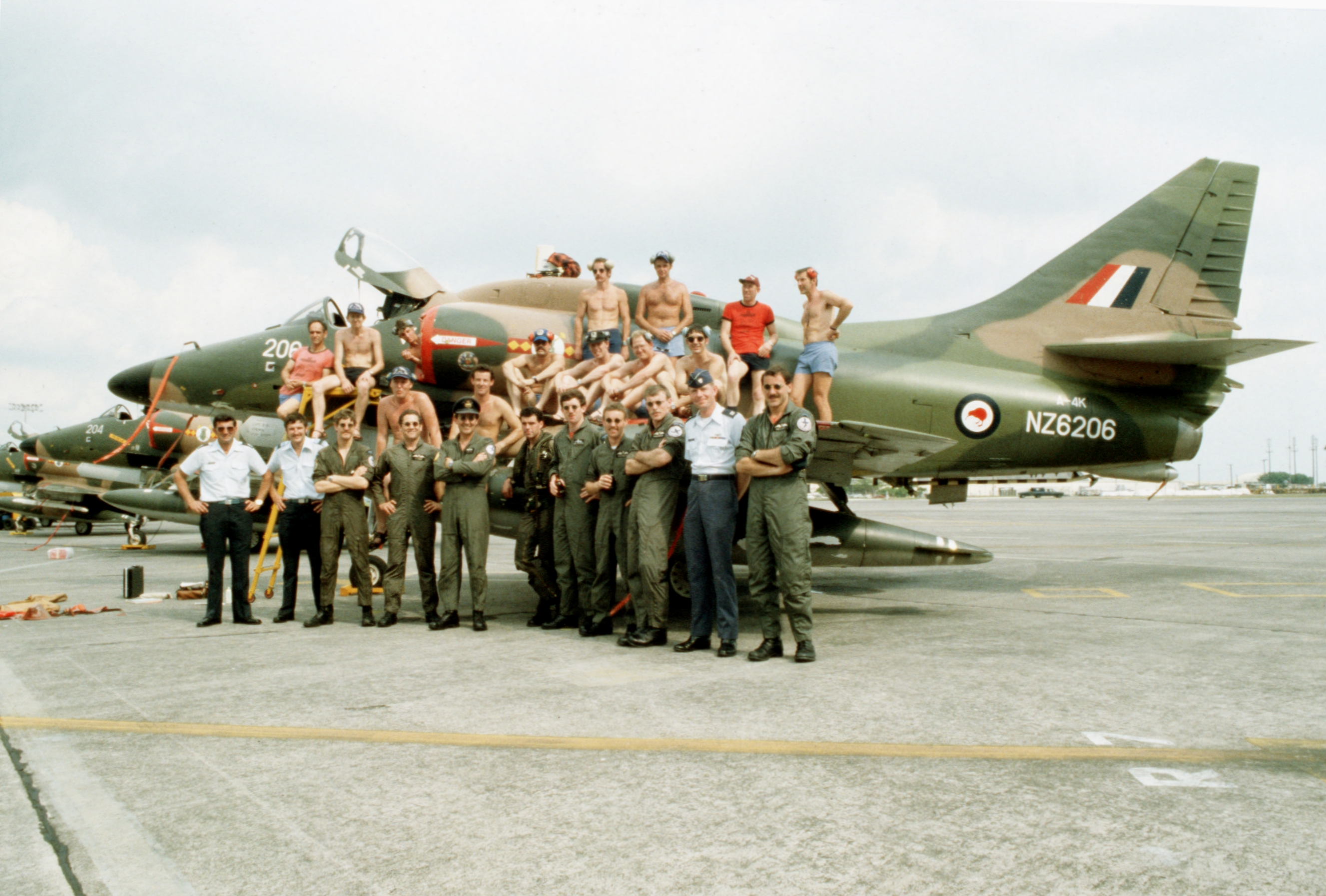
A-4K with 75 Sqn RNZAF

By the 1980s, the Skyhawks were reaching the end of their effective use. Three options were considered; the purchase of more capable second hand aircraft such as the F-4 Phantom II, new aircraft such as the F-16 Fighting Falcon, or an upgrade for the A-4 Skyhawk. Eventually, a comprehensive upgrade to the Skyhawk was chosen.

The Skyhawk upgrade was extremely comprehensive, including a new radar, HOTAS controls, glass cockpit with HUD and new inertial navigation system. The aircraft also received armament upgrades including the capability to fire AIM-9L Sidewinder air-to-air missiles, AGM-65 Maverick air-to-ground missiles and GBU-16 Paveway II laser-guided bombs. The cost of the project was NZ$140 million and gave the RNZAF Skyhawks the electronic “eyes and ears” of a modern fighter aircraft such as the F-16 Fighting Falcon or McDonnell Douglas F/A-18 Hornet. Despite cooling of NZ-US relations over New Zealands new anti-nuclear policy, the US Congress gave its approval in December 1985, while other work was accomplished by New Zealand-based companies such as Pacific Aerospace.

To complement these upgrades, the new Aermacchi MB-339 was introduced as an advanced jet trainer.

Wing Commander Ian Gore said:

The Skyhawk has gone from an aircraft with no systems you could rely on, to one with the capability of modern front-line fighters, at a fraction of the cost.

— Wing Commander Ian Gore

The 1997 White Paper commented further: "The aircraft are old but sturdy. They have been rewinged and seven years ago were given a major upgrade. They have sufficient life left to perform effectively into the next decade." However, while the upgrades took place, it was further planned to eventually replace the Skyhawk fleet with leased F-16 Aircraft from the United States in the near future.

== The Deal of the Century ==
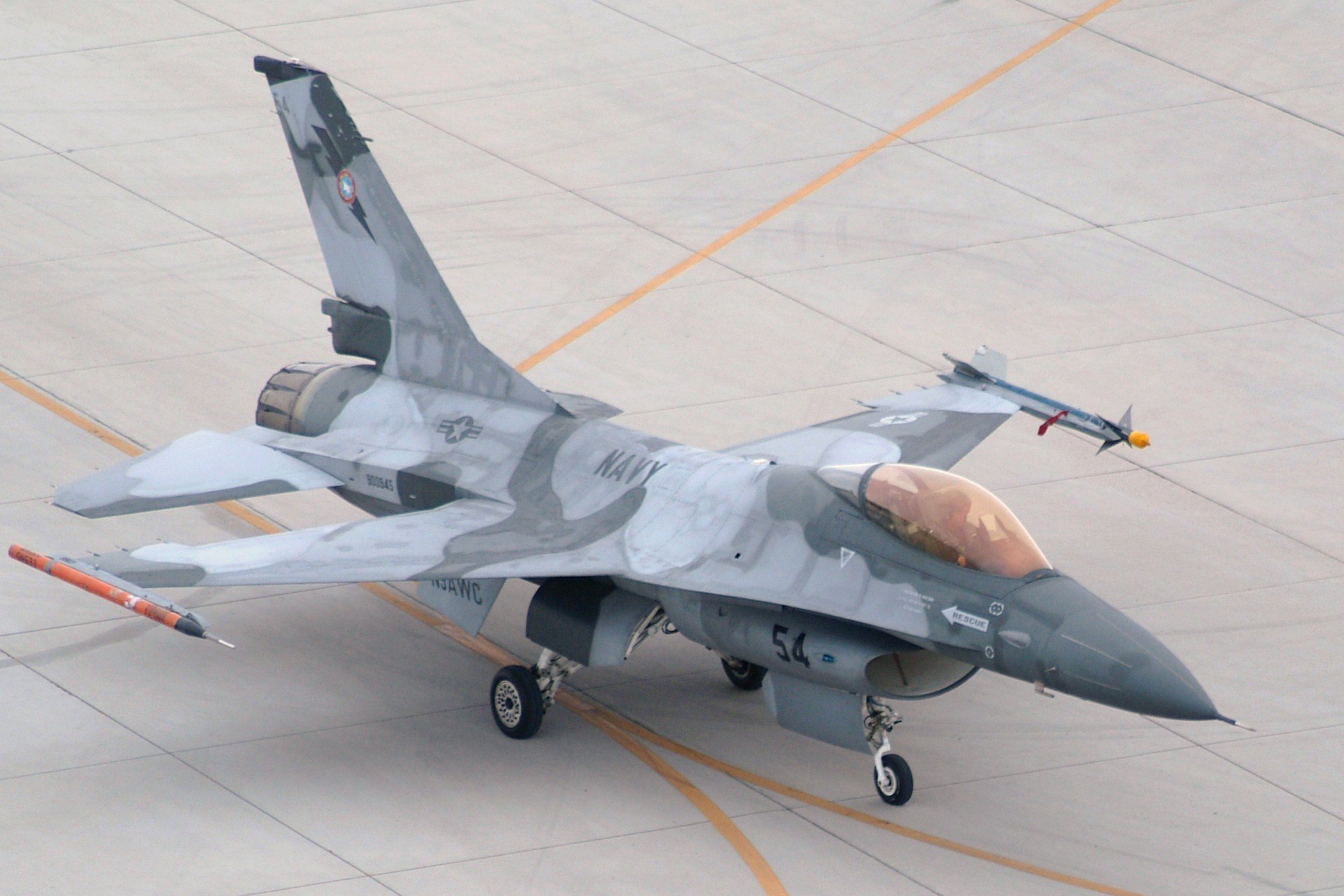
One of the 28 F-16 aircraft originally intended for sale to the Pakistan Air Force. Earmarked for lease to the RNZAF in 1998 as NZ6524. Now utilised by the United States Navy Naval Aviation Warfighting Development Center.

In December 1998, the New Zealand Government made an announcement that it would lease 28 F-16 Fighting Falcon Block 15OCU (13 single seaters and 15 two seaters) aircraft from the United States. The Block 15 aircraft featured improvements such as enlarged horizontal stabilisers and an improved AN/APG-66(V)2 radar. The aircraft had initially been ordered by Pakistan in 1990, but had been stored at the 309th Aerospace Maintenance and Regeneration Group (AMARG) storage facility after test flights were completed, as a result of a US Congress embargo against Pakistan due to tensions relating to nuclear weapons at the time. As a result, these aircraft had negligible engine and airframe time. These low figures, in combination with the fact that these aircraft were some of the newest F-16 aircraft built at the time, was a driving force behind the deal. The government decided to acquire the aircraft under a lease-buy deal, with payments taking place over the course of 10 years, with much of the total cost being offset by the proposed sale of the existing A-4 Skyhawk fleet to the Philippine Air Force. After the ten-year lease, the option was available to purchase all 28 aircraft for $140M USD.

A paper from the Centre for Strategic Studies stated that F-16 fighter aircraft would be a preferable choice in comparison to reconstituting the air combat force with attack helicopters, stating that "The F-16 is a much lower cost option, is more versatile, effective in a wider range of roles, easier to deploy, less risk to operate and will be usable from the time the aircraft arrived in New Zealand."

The formal lease contract was signed in August 1999, with No. 2 Squadron RNZAF and No. 75 Squadron RNZAF envisaged as the squadrons to operate the aircraft. By early 2000, $35M NZD in payments had been made, with a number of RNZAF personnel in the United States to facilitate the deal. A number of promotional materials were also created to facilitate the sales of the existing Skyhawk fleet. It was intended that the aircraft would be used to support New Zealand, Australian, Singaporean and Malaysian defence forces as well as other allies and partners.

The deal became a topic of discussion during the 1999 New Zealand general election, with various political figures expressing their viewpoint on the deal at a pre-election debate held in October 1999 at the University of Auckland.

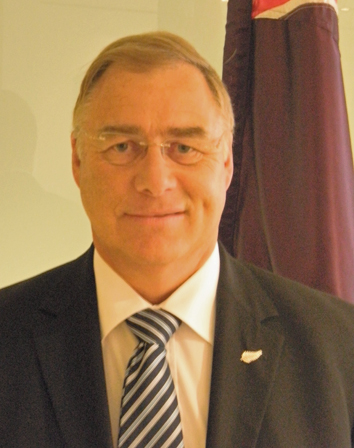
Wayne Mapp

National Party

National Party MP Wayne Mapp asserted the importance of a balanced force, highlighting that not all potential emergencies can be addressed solely through land-based strategies. Despite the Army's capabilities, it may not always be the most suitable option for certain emergencies, underscoring the importance of a comprehensive and versatile defense approach. The foreign policy importance of the deal in improving the then frosty relations with the United States was also discussed as a major factor.

Quite clearly, the military utility of the F-16s lies at the high end of military threats. These happen rarely, but are very damaging. Rather like earthquakes, the large ones are rare events, but when they do happen, they are immensely destructive. The air combat force is not just about military utility. It is also about restoring our defence relationships, particularly with the United States. If we had failed to accept the extremely favourable lease agreement for the F-16s, our friends and allies would question our commitment to the security of the region.

— Wayne Mapp, Dealing with the Consequence of Victory in the Cold War

Labour Party

The opposition Labour Party was not in favour of the deal, in addition to further spending on offensive military capabilities. Labour MP Phil Goff outlined New Zealand's evolving role in international security, emphasizing the diminishing threat of global war following the end of the Cold War, citing the end of history narrative prevalent at the time. Goff further highlighted the country's increasing involvement in low intensity peacekeeping missions. Goff expressed the Labour Party's belief in focusing on contributing to global security through peacekeeping efforts, citing New Zealand's economic and political interests in promoting a peaceful international environment. He underscores the nation's commitment to preventing aggression and upholding international law. Goff views peacekeeping as a crucial means of translating concerns about human rights into tangible actions, noting the widespread support for such endeavors in both political and public spheres in New Zealand. Finally Goff, himself a former protester of New Zealand's involvement in Vietnam, contrasts New Zealand's support for peacekeeping missions with past military involvement in Vietnam.

In particular regard to the F-16 deal, Goff stated:

Labour opposes the decision to invest what will amount to $700 million on the F-16 jet aircraft. It also opposes the purchase of further ANZAC frigates. Neither can be considered a priority if peace keeping is to continue to be the focus of deployment of our armed forces. In opting for frigates and F-16s, the National Government has put display ahead of utility. It has been concerned more about pleasing military chiefs in Australia and the United States, than about meeting the practical needs arising from the responsibilities we are actually placing on our armed forces

— Phil Goff, Preventing Aggression and Upholding International Law

As a result, the official Labour Party platform was to strongly oppose the deal, in favour of addressing deficiencies in the composition of the New Zealand Army, primarily for the role of performing peacekeeping operations.

ACT Party

Derek Quigley of the ACT Party, in his paper Pragmatic Basis for Security Relationships agreed with the general ambitions to reorganise the New Zealand Defence Force into a primarily peacekeeping force, but emphasised the importance of having a minimal viable level of capability.

Alliance

Alliance MP Matt Robson emphasised the importance of making a decision that would maximise New Zealand's geopolitical independence, preferring to allocate funding to the renewal of the Air Force's C-130 Hercules fleet, as well as a logistics support ship.

Green Party

The Green Party was against the deal, with Keith Locke stating the parties case for conventional disarmament. The party proposed halving defence spending to $800 million NZD through eliminating air and naval combat capabilities.

We should get out of the Five Power Defence Arrangement, and drastically changing our relationship with Australia, as long as it has an outdated defence strategy, more related to a Cold War scenario, and subordinate to America's. The Greens say that no longer should New Zealand be a subordinate power to the United States, Australia or anyone else. This is not isolationism. We actually think New Zealand has a tremendously important role to play in world politics.

— Keith Locke, Foreign Policy Starts with a Global Vision

NZ First

New Zealand First Member Ron Mark affirmed NZ Firsts proposals to rescind the F-16 deal, as well as a third Anzac-class frigate, preferring to focus on the development of the New Zealand Army. This would be done through the proposed reintroduction of compulsory military service and investment in facilities, equipment and training.

== Helen Clark and the Fifth Labour Government ==
=== Cancellation of the F-16 Deal ===
Helen Clark led the New Zealand Labour Party to success in the 1999 New Zealand General Election, forming a coalition government with the left-leaning Green Party and Alliance Party. Following the election, President of the United States Bill Clinton attempted to shore up the deal, as reported by Flight International.

Flight International further reported that in the fallout of the election, Russian aircraft company Sukhoi reportedly offered an alternative proposal for the lease of an unspecified number of Sukhoi Su-30 multirole fighters and supporting equipment, undercutting the F-16 deal.

The new government commissioned Derek Quigley to review the F-16 deal on 20 December 1999. Quigley's report was published on 6 March 2000. The report was critical of a lack of proper processes in determining defence acquisition priorities, and noted that multiple top-priority projects had not yet had funding allocated. Quigley recommended "that the New Zealand Government consider approaching the US Government with a view to renegotiating the current F-16 package to include a lesser number of aircraft" and that defence procurement processes be improved more broadly.

On 20 March 2000 Clark announced the cancellation of the F-16 deal. She stated that while reducing the number of F-16s as recommended by Quigley would have moderated the funding pressure the lease posed for the defence budget, "it would not have removed it". She also noted that while the lease deal was a bargain, "the mere existence of a bargain at a sale is not a reason for buying it". Clark stated that the Government would focus on improving priority-setting in the defence budget, which would include consideration of whether the air combat force should be retained.

=== Disbandment ===
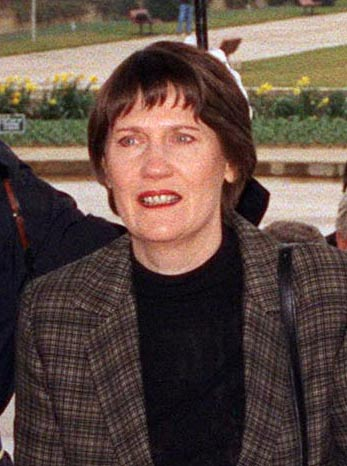
Helen Clark

The Department of the Prime Minister and Cabinet published a report on options for the RNZN's air combat capability in February 2001. This report argued that reducing the number of strike aircraft to 14 would not free up enough funds by itself to meet the needs of other elements of the RNZAF. The report judged that disbanding the air combat force "would assist in the rebuilding of the NZDF, significantly reducing the need for additional funding".

On 8 May 2001, Clark announced that the government had decided to disband the RNZAF's air combat force, which would involve withdrawing the Skyhawks and Aermacchi MB-339 training jets. The government estimated that this would free up $870 million over ten years, which would be reallocated to other areas of the NZDF. In particular, the government intended to improve the capabilities of the Army.

There was a mixed reaction to Clark's announcement. Members of the air combat force were deeply disappointed, and morale across the RNZAF was badly affected. The views of defence experts differed, with some also being disappointed while others supported the decision on the grounds that the air combat force was of little practical value. The National Party opposition disagreed with disbanding the air combat force, with opposition leader Jenny Shipley labelling it "the bludger's option". Clark rejected this accusation, with a statement in parliament.

What it comes down to is not a debate about the money. It is a debate about how we configure the force. If the Leader of the Opposition thinks the difference between being combat ready, and not combat ready, is 17 clapped-out Skyhawks, then she has less intelligence than I gave her credit for. And that is the difference! If she thinks the difference between being isolationist, and not isolationist, is having 17 clapped-out Skyhawks, she really is as silly as that speech implied. It is simply ridiculous.

— Helen Clark, New Zealand Parliamentary Debate - Tuesday, May 08, 2001 - Government's Defence Announcement

The decision was also debated in the community, but received overall public support.

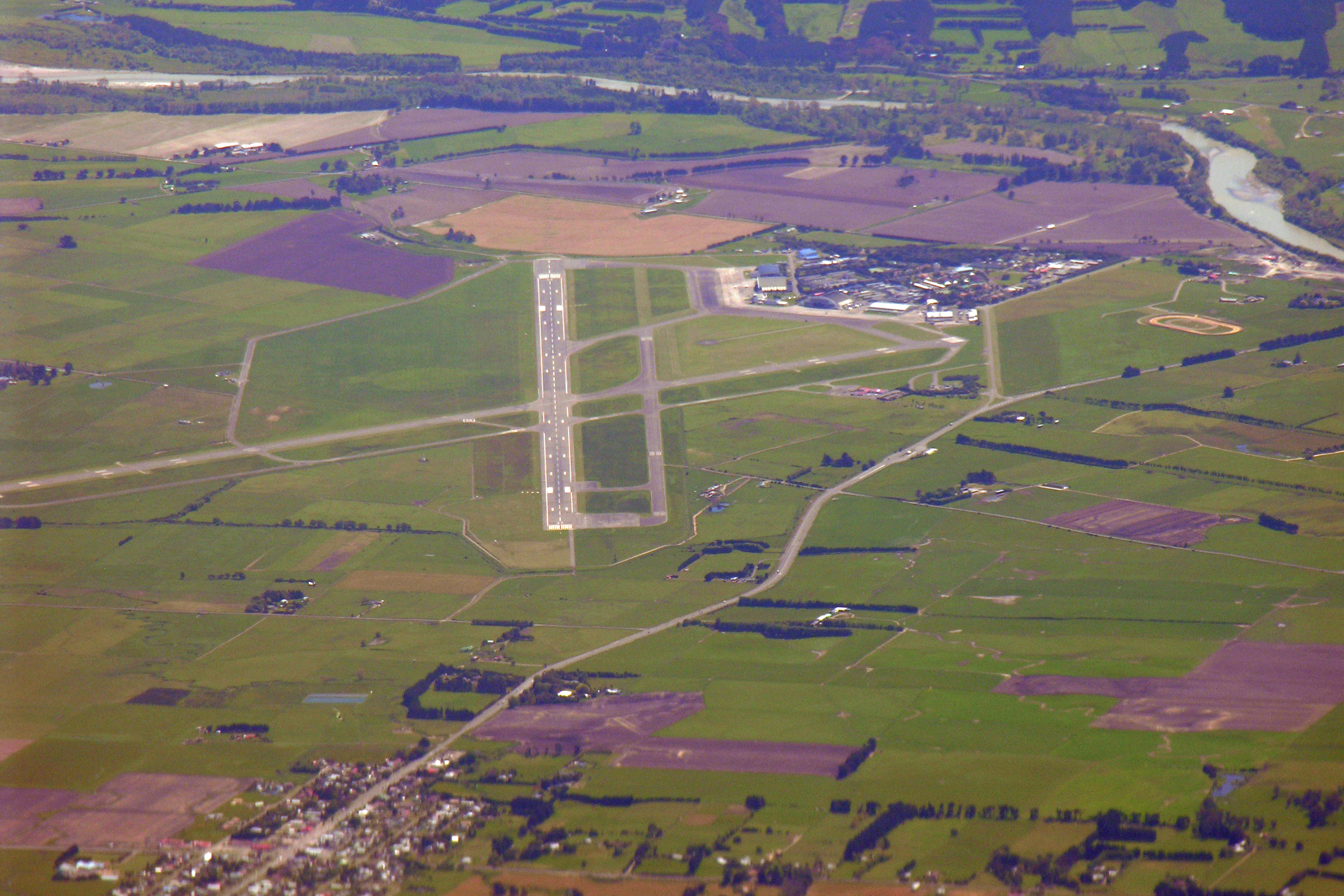
RNZAF Base Ohakea in 2005 with empty No. 14 Squadron RNZAF and No. 75 Squadron RNZAF flightline.

The Air Combat Force, comprising No. 2 Squadron RNZAF, No. 14 Squadron RNZAF, and No. 75 Squadron RNZAF, were officially disbanded on 13 December 2001. The disbandment day parade marched the three squadron standards to the RNZAF Base Ohakea chapel. Alongside the disbanding of the aircraft themselves, the RNZAF saw the loss of a significant number of pilots, equipment and technical knowledge. Many Pilots and other service personnel were made redundant, with many seeking employment in the Royal Air Force and Royal Australian Air Force. A political group of concerned civilians and ex-serviceman, called "Save Our Squadrons (SOS)" was formed to protest the move, and took high court action in an attempt to prevent its loss, but was unsuccessful

=== Disposal ===
The sale and disposal of the Skyhawk and Aermacchi aircraft took over a decade. The RNZAF withdrew the aircraft from service in 2001 and they were put into storage awaiting sale. Maintenance and storage work was contracted to SAFE Air at RNZAF Base Ohakea under the Air Combat Force Disposal Unit (ACFDU). Most aircraft were later sent to RNZAF Base Woodbourne for storage indoors from 2001 to 2007. The final A-4 flight took place with airframe NZ6205 on 30 July 2004, piloted by ex Air Force pilot Squadron Leader Chris Underwood.

In December 2007, the aircraft were transferred outside with a latex covering. However, due to the wet climate of New Zealand, the condition of these aircraft rapidly deteriorated, with some sustaining significant water damage. the damaged aircraft were later given to museums in New Zealand and Australia, with the remaining eventually being sold to private operators.

== Commentary ==
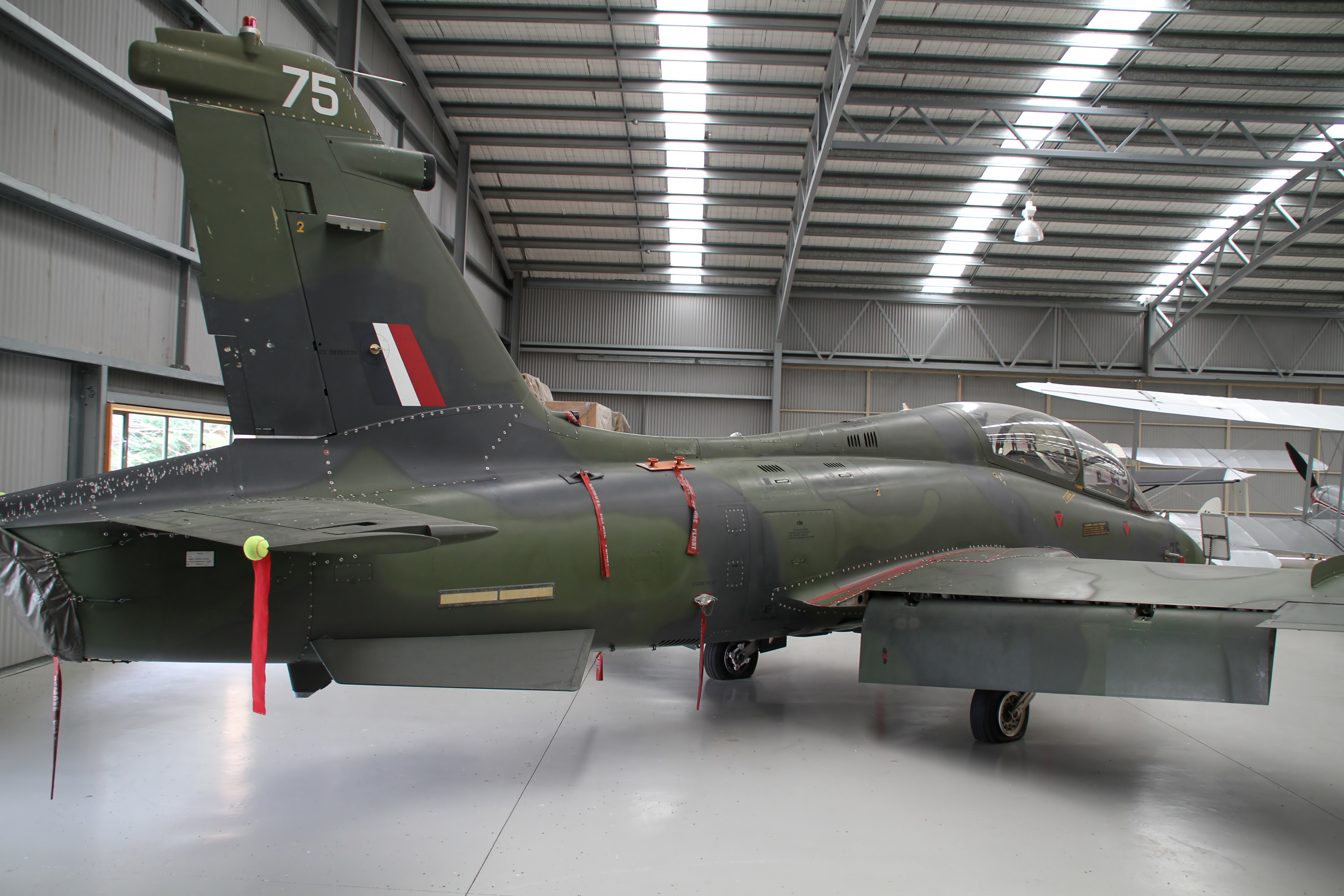
Former RNZAF Aermacchi MB-339 jet trainer and light attack aircraft operated from 1991 to 2002.

The restoration of the Air Combat Force has been suggested by several political figures in the two decade period since its disbandment.

During the 2002 New Zealand general election, ACT New Zealand party leader Richard Prebble suggested that the Air Combat Force could be reconstituted using the A-4 Skyhawk and Aermacchi MB-339 aircraft which were then still in storage. Prebble stated:

Contrary to media reports, the Skyhawks are not obsolete, having recently been upgraded. Act's information is that the planes could be fully recommissioned for as little as $30 million.

In addition, Prebble stated that ACT would then look at future replacements, through seeking a reproachment with the United States in regards to the Australia, New Zealand, United States Security Treaty (ANZUS). However, potential coalition partner and National Leader Bill English announced at the same time that there was "no possibility" of keeping the Skyhawk aircraft.

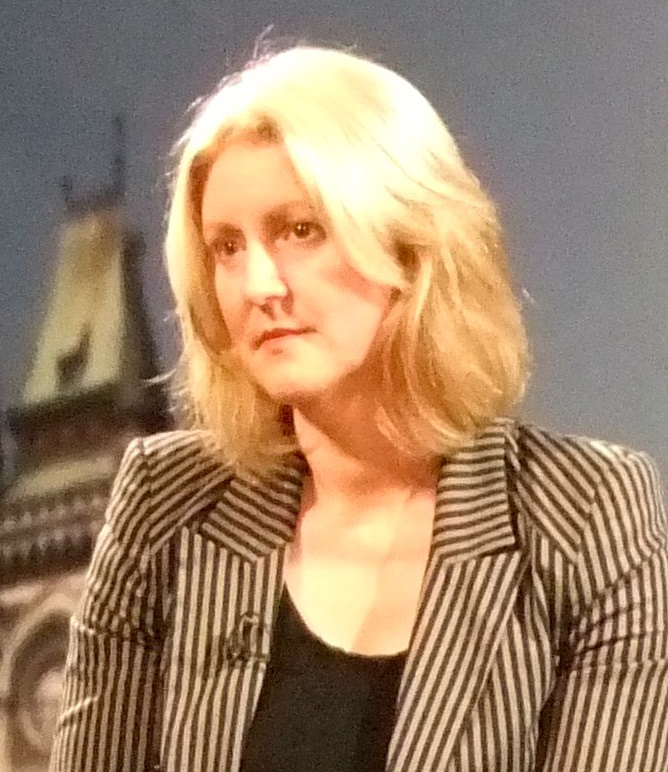
Heather Roy

In November 2008, the Labour Government was defeated by the National Party led by John Key. While wishing to reinstate the ACF, at this point, it was deemed unfeasible due to the loss of equipment, pilots and the deteriorating condition of the aircraft in storage at RNZAF Base Woodbourne.

In 2010, Associate Minister of Defence Heather Roy stated that a restoration of the ACF that would be difficult to achieve, stating "There is this romantic idea I suppose that it's a great thing to have. Given that they are no longer flying it's much harder to reinstate that."

In 2011, the Dominion Post stated that Defence officials had hoped to return 17 Aermacchi MB-339 jet trainers to service, but were unable due to "engine issues". The article further states that Diplomatic cables suggested that United States officials had been highly critical of New Zealand's defence capabilities, stating that the low defence budget of the countries had "not even been adequate to cover replacement costs for basic coastal defence hardware". Senior fellow at the Centre for Strategic Studies Lance Beath further affirmed this position, stating that New Zealand would face a future with no "fast-jet" defence capability, with the air force now relegated to transport and trainer aircraft, as well as a small number of helicopters. Political blogger Karl du Fresne agreed with this viewpoint, further asserting that the NZDF "now completely lacks international credibility".

== Private use ==
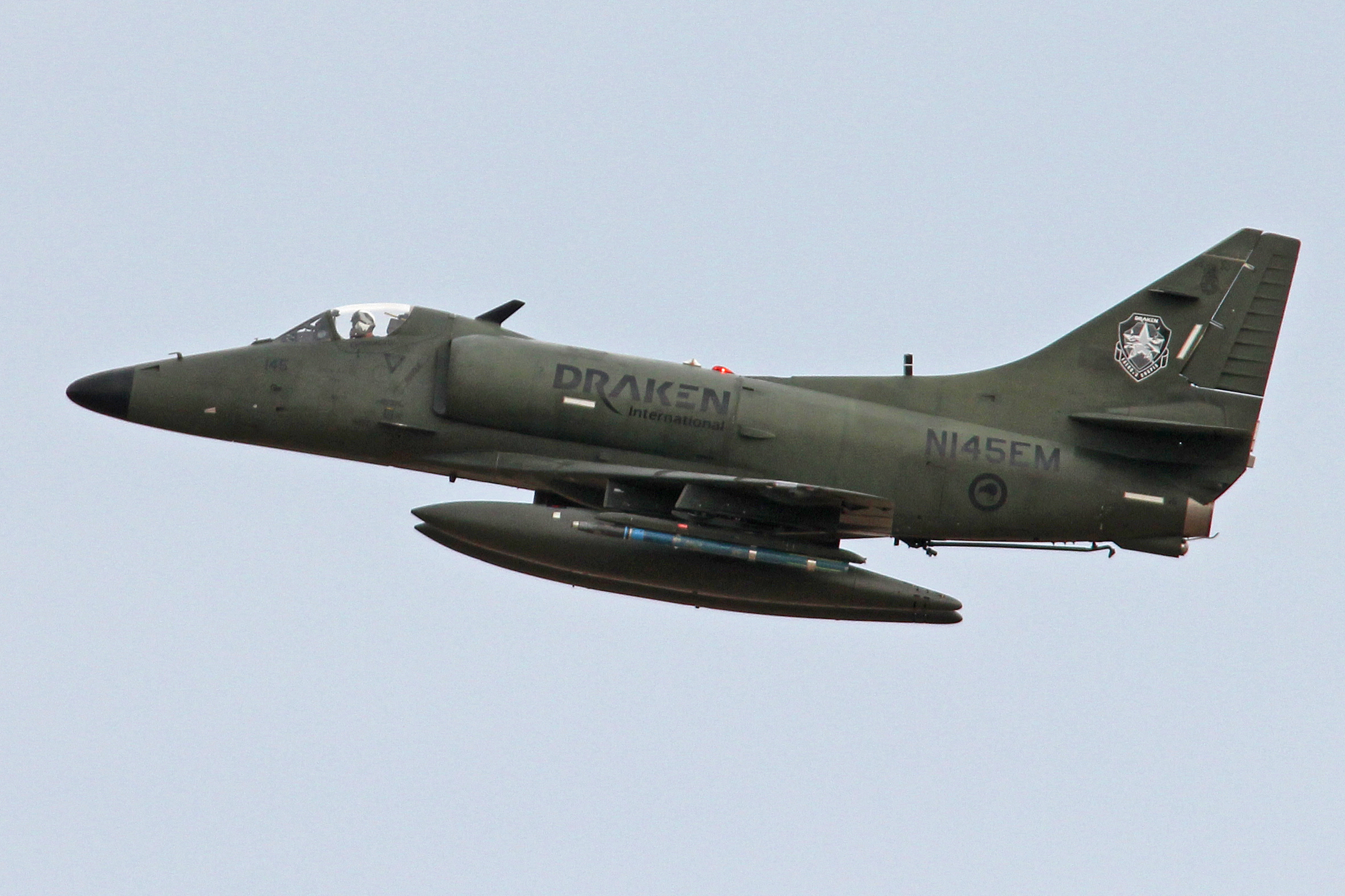
A-4K N145EM operated by Draken International with Kiwi roundel and 75 Squadron markings retained.

In 2011, eight former RNZAF A-4K and TA-4K Skyhawk aircraft were sold to the private United States based military contractor Draken International for the purposes of serving as privately operated aggressor squadron aircraft for the United States Air Force and United States Navy. Six of these aircraft were former Royal Australian Navy A-4G naval aviation aircraft which had logged relatively low flying time. The aircraft were acquired for $7.9 million NZD including 20 additional Pratt & Whitney J52 engines and spare parts. Draken International International additionally acquired nine former No. 14 Squadron RNZAF Aermacchi MB-339 jet trainer aircraft, which were decommissioned in 2001, but were flown occasionally to keep them in operational condition. Draken International received permission from the New Zealand Government to operate the aircraft while retaining their original RNZAF liveries.

Most of them probably wish the airplanes were still flying in New Zealand, and I don't blame them, but the next best thing in their mind is that they're flying again.

— Founder of Draken International, Jared Isaacman

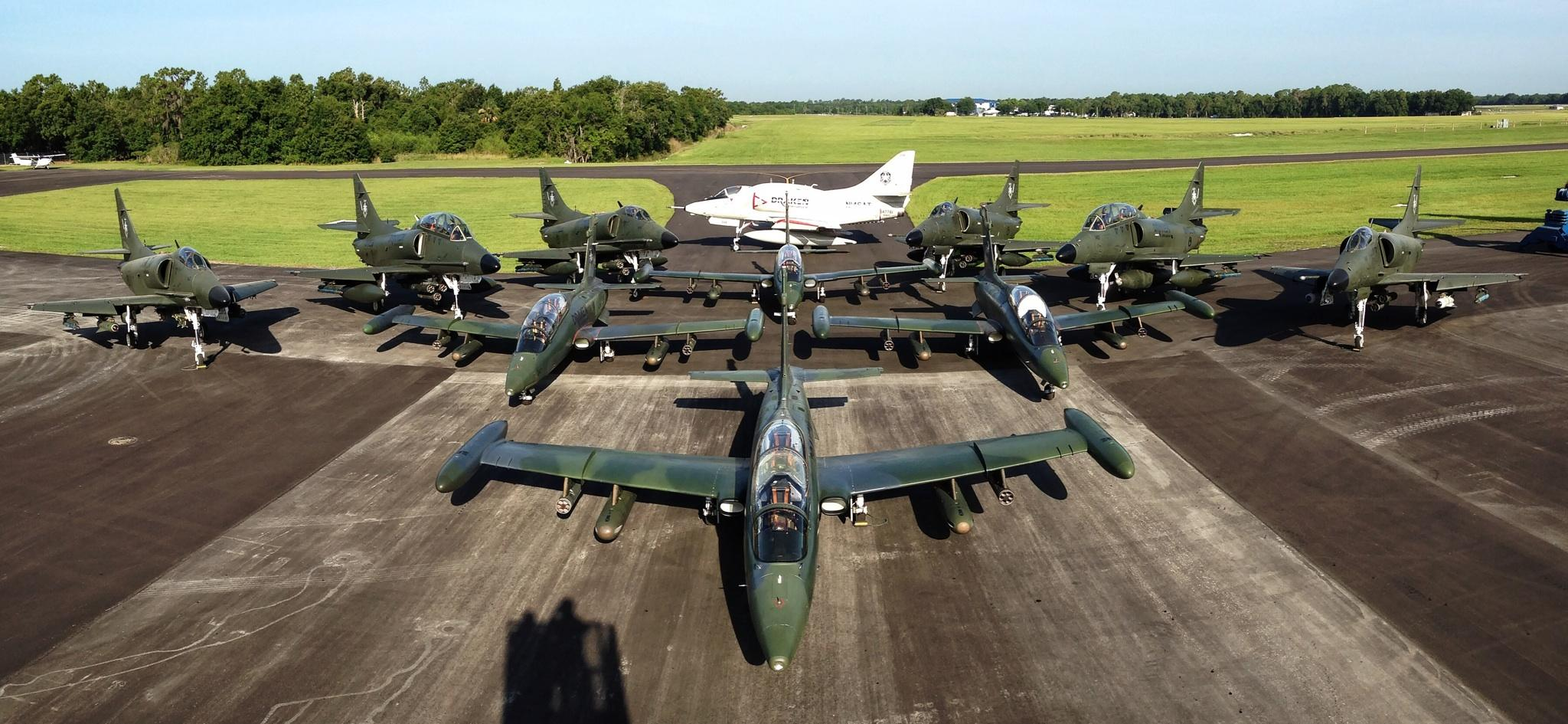
A number of former RNZAF A-4 Skyhawk and MB-339 aircraft in service with Draken International. The private aircraft are used to provide aggressor squadron training for the United States Air Force and United States Navy.

Two aircraft operated by Draken International crashed in 2016 and 2023, but resulted in no fatalities.

In 2022, the United States Air Force decided not to renew its contract with Draken International for aggressor training, as it determined the aircraft could no longer provide the required level of training, citing the use of more advanced fourth and fifth generation aircraft such as the Su-35, Su-57, J-10 and J-20 in use by Russia and China. USAF Lieutenant General David Nahom told the Senate Appropriations defence subcommittee on May 17 that while Draken's aircraft were good for basic pilot training, they were not effective against jets like F-22s or F-35s” in exercises.

The nine MB-339 aircraft purchased by Draken International were later transferred in 2019 to the French private aircraft operator SDTS. These aircraft would supply aggressor squadron training for French Naval Aviation. One of these aircraft were destroyed on 10 October 2023 during a training flight at Nîmes–Alès–Camargue–Cévennes Airport. However, both crew were able to eject and only sustained minor injuries.

== See also ==
- Royal New Zealand Air Force
