= Robert Cecil Dawkins =

Group Captain Robert Cecil Dawkins CBE
- Born: 1903; Holloway, London, England
- Died: 1985 (aged 81–82); Newton Blossomville, England
- Military career
- Allegiance: United Kingdom
- Branch: Royal Air Force
- Service years: 1932-1955
- Rank: Group Captain
- Service number: 27251
- Commands: RAF Tengah; R.A.F. Hendon
- Conflicts: World War II

Group Captain Robert Cecil Dawkins CBE (1903–1985) was a senior officer in the Royal Air Force. In September 1951 he was made CBE for services in Malaya, principally for operational achievements while he was in command of the R.A.F. station at Tengah. In 1951 he was made station commander at R.A.F. Hendon until his retirement in 1955.

== Life ==
Robert Cecil Dawkins was born on 6 March 1903 in Holloway, London. He was the son of Frederick Adolphus Dawkins and Adelaide (née Maude) and was educated at Bedford Modern School between 1912 and 1920.

Dawkins saw service with the Fleet Air Arm between 1932 and 1938, becoming squadron leader on 1 October 1938. Shortly after the outbreak of World War II he was promoted to wing commander. For much of the war, he served with Coastal Command and ‘commanded several important stations at home and abroad’. In 1944 he was promoted to temporary group captain.

In 1947, Dawkins was made substantive group captain, and became superintendent of flying at the Aeroplane and Armament Experimental Establishment at Boscombe Down. In 1949 he was appointed deputy director of accident prevention at the Air Ministry.

In 1950, Group Captain Dawkins was put in command of the R.A.F. station at Tengah and in recognition of his operational achievements while holding that command he was made CBE. The citation for his CBE read that ‘by his sympathy, example and determination he had shown outstanding devotion to duty’.

In 1951 Dawkins returned to England and was made station commander at R.A.F. Hendon, a position he held until his retirement on 15 March 1955. Dawkins died in Newton Blossomville in 1985.
