= No. 14 Squadron RNZAF =

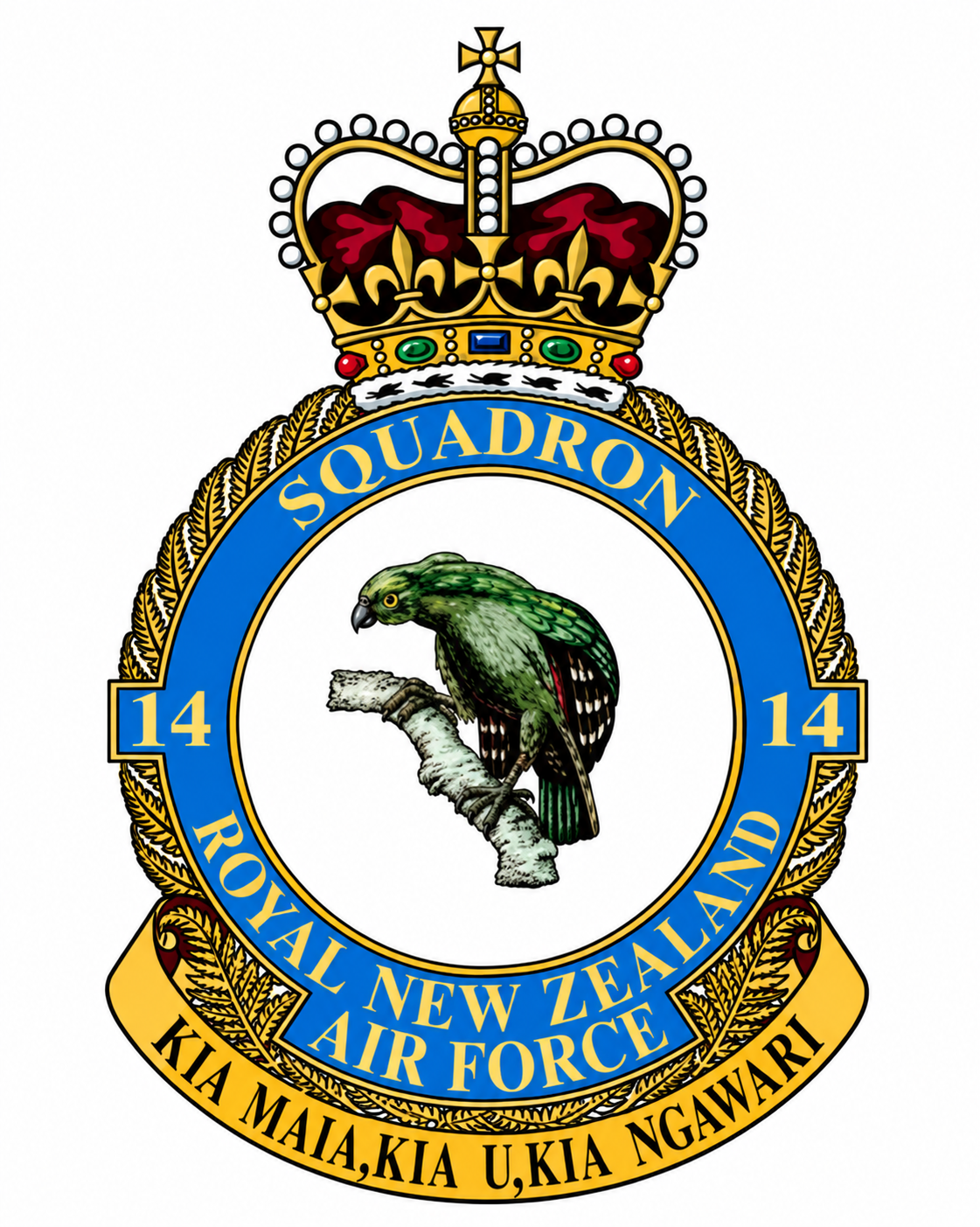
- Active: 25 April 1942 – January 1949; 3 September 1951 – 13 December 2001; 5 January 2015 – Present
- Country: New Zealand
- Branch: Royal New Zealand Air Force
- Type: Primary and Advanced Training
- Garrison/HQ: RNZAF Base Ohakea
- Mottos: Māori: Kia Maia, kia u, kia ngawari (Translation: Active, ardent, adaptable)
- Colors: Black and white
- Mascot: Kea
- Anniversaries: 25 April
- Equipment: Beechcraft T-6 Texan II
- Engagements: World War II; Solomon Islands campaign; Cold War; Malayan Emergency; Indonesia-Malaysia confrontation

Commanders
- Current commander: Squadron Leader Taylor Berriman

Insignia
- Squadron Badge: A kea in perching position
- Squadron Codes: HQ (Apr 1942 – 1944); AX (Apr 1949 – 1950)

No. 14 Squadron RNZAF is a squadron of the Royal New Zealand Air Force. Formed during the Second World War, it served in the Solomon Islands campaign and in the postwar occupation of Japan. During the Cold War the squadron was stationed in the Middle East for a time and later in Singapore during the Indonesia-Malaysia confrontation. It was disbanded in 2001 along with the rest of the RNZAF Strike Wing. In 2015 No. 14 Squadron was re-raised and equipped with 11 Beechcraft T-6 Texan II. A new aerobatic display team called the Black Falcons was also formed using the new aircraft. They replaced the RNZAF display team known as the Red Checkers.

== History ==
Until World War II, New Zealand's air force concentrated on training, transport and maritime attack. The vast distance of the Pacific Ocean seemed a defence against attack by air. Until 1938, only a handful of record breaking air flights had flown to New Zealand, where they were required to land and refuel, suggesting that an enemy attack could not both get to, attack, and then return from a mission to New Zealand. The New Zealand Permanent Air Force operated token numbers of Bristol Fighters and Gloster Grebes. As far as operations overseas went, it was assumed New Zealand would be embedded within Britain's Royal Air Force. In Europe, this was the case. During the 1930s New Zealanders joined the RAF through RAF scholarships and short service commissions, like the first RAF ace of WWII, 'Cobber' Kain. In the opening years of World War II, the RNZAF produced many pilots for the RAF, including fighter pilots. Many New Zealanders trained in Canada for the RAF with the Empire Air Training Scheme. Nos 485(NZ), 486(NZ) fighter squadrons fought in Europe. However there were no fighter units in New Zealand itself when war broke out with Japan.

In response to the rising threat from Japan, the pilots of 488(NZ) fighter squadron arrived in Singapore in November 1941, where they received Brewster Buffalos. Together with RAAF and RAF Buffalo units, including No. 453 Squadron RAAF (which was also partly manned by New Zealanders), they provided the Commonwealth's only fighter force in the region. While the Japanese army advanced down Peninsular Malaysia, these squadrons fought an unsuccessful defence. The Japanese were better trained and more numerous, and as numbers dwindled, the squadrons' aircraft eventually came to be amalgamated within 488 Squadron, before in January 1942 on the eve of Singapore's surrender 488 Squadron was withdrawn to Batavia (now Jakarta) and then New Zealand.

== Operational service ==
=== World War II ===
In 1942, the threat of attack seemed real; the city of Darwin was bombed, New Guinea invaded and Japanese reconnaissance aircraft overflew Auckland and Wellington. The New Zealand Government hurriedly formed 488's battle-experienced pilots into the RNZAF's first fighter unit. No. 14 Squadron formed under Squadron Leader John MacKenzie at Masterton on 25 April 1942, equipped with North American Harvards until P-40 Kittyhawks could be obtained.

The allied plan was for the Americans to defeat the Japanese by island hopping north across the Pacific. This plan involved bypassing major Japanese bases, which would continue to operate in the allied rear. The RNZAF was given the job of operating against these bypassed Japanese units. At first, maritime patrol and bomber units moved into the Pacific, followed by 15 Squadron with Kittyhawks. In April 1943, a year after forming, 14 Squadron moved to the rear base at Espiritu Santo to resume action against the Japanese.

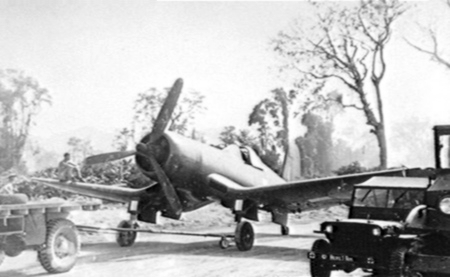
A 14 Sqn F4U-1 on Bougainville, 1944.

For the remainder of the war, 14 Squadron rotated between forward and rear bases in the Pacific and 6-week periods of home leave in New Zealand. On 11 June 1943, 14 Squadron moved to the forward base of Kukum Field on Guadalcanal—on its first contact with the enemy, the following day, six Japanese aircraft were destroyed. The five RNZAF P-40 squadrons went on to claim 99 Japanese aircraft (subsequent, possibly partisan, research raised the figure to a round 100). No. 14 Squadron claimed more than its share of the total, and one of its pilots, Geoff Fisken, became the top scoring Commonwealth ace in the Pacific (although half his victories were acquired with 243 Squadron).

The squadron deployed to different bases in the South Pacific as demanded. In November 1943, 14 Squadron moved for the first time to New Georgia, followed by Bougainville in February 1944, Green Island in December, and Emirau in July 1945. In 1944, 14 Squadron became one of 13 RNZAF squadrons re-equipped with Vought F4U Corsairs, but by this time the Japanese fighters had been all but eliminated and the unit increasingly attacked ground targets.

On 15 January 1945 during an attack on Toboi, southwest of Rabaul, by Corsairs from 14 and 16 Squadrons, a 14 Squadron Corsair was shot down and the pilot parachuted into Simpson Harbour. 14 and 16 Squadron Corsairs provided fighter cover for a possible rescue operation until the evening when, low on fuel they returned to Green Island. Encountering a tropical storm during their return flight, five Corsairs crashed into the sea, one crashed at Green Island while landing and a seventh disappeared in clouds with all seven pilots killed. The shot down pilot was captured by the Japanese and died in captivity.

The squadron was about to re-equip with P-51 Mustangs when Japan surrendered, and the P-51s were re-allocated to territorial units.

A P-40 flown in action by Fisken and two other New Zealand aces has been restored to flying condition and is privately owned in New Zealand.

=== Cold War ===
No 14 Squadron was reformed following the surrender of Japan, commanded by Squadron Leader Jesse de Willimoff, and later by Squadron Leader D.F St George. The squadron was outfitted with newer Corsair FG-1D fighter aircraft and the US extended its Lend-lease arrangement to over the cost. It became part of the British Commonwealth Occupation Force component of the J-Force occupational coalition. initially located in southern Honshu at the former Japanese naval air base at Iwakuni. The squadron flew armed patrols to protect armament and bomb dumps, to identify locations of hidden ammunition and check schoolyards for forbidden military parades. They undertook surveillance flights over the seas between Japan and Korea to identify and turn back boats smuggling Koreans into Japan.

The squadron stayed in Japan for a second year despite lacking a third of its ground staff due to the New Zealand Treasury Department refusing to fund recruiting advertisements. In February 1948 No. 14 Squadron moved to Hōfu Air Field to replace Australian Air Force Mustangs. After the decision was made to terminate J-Force, 20 Corsairs were stacked together at one end of the airfield in October 1949 and set alight. The air force considered the aircraft to be at the end of their useful life and couldn't justify the expense of returning them to New Zealand. The only casualty during the deployment involved Flight Lieutenant C.W. N Wright who was killed when his aircraft crashed on takeoff. Personnel departed Japan on 25 November 1948 on MV Westralia. During its 29 months tour of duty in Japan, 14 Squadron recorded 6225 hours flying time for 6109 sorties.

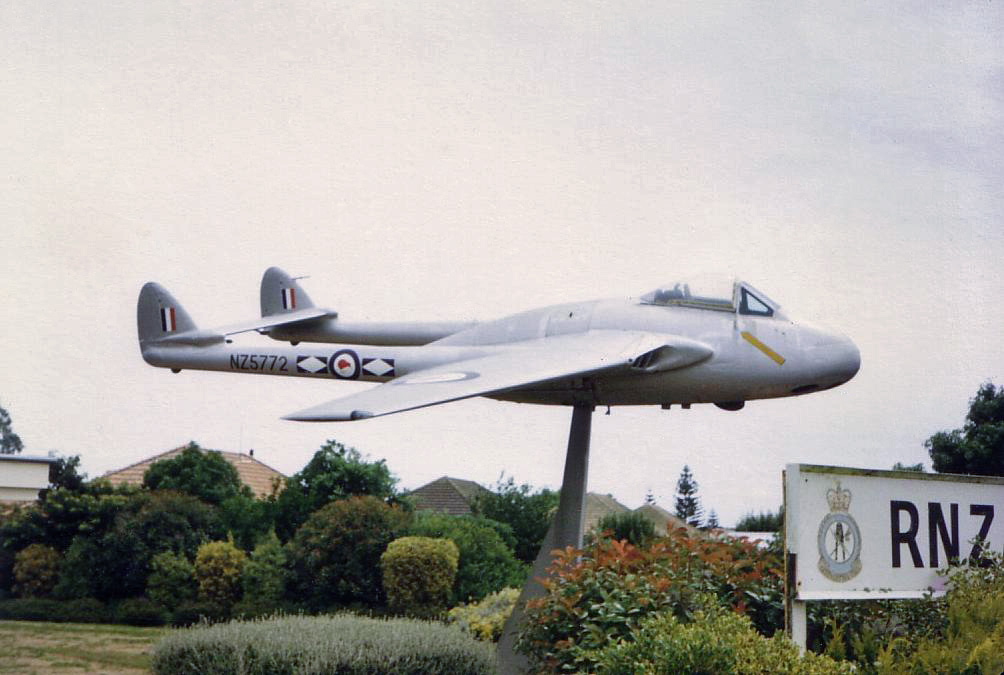
14 Squadron Vampire on gate duty at Ohakea

On return from Japan, the squadron briefly operated de Havilland Mosquitoes, converting pilots to the fighter bomber role. No. 14 Squadron re-equipped with sixteen de Havilland Vampire jets in 1952. It was based in Cyprus from 1952 to 1955 as part of RAF Middle East Air Force. There is a colourful account of Squadron Leader Max Hope, OC 14 Squadron, being cryptically told that the unit was being deployed to Cyprus by the Chief of the Air Staff via National Geographic Magazine, reported in Bentley's RNZAF - A Short History. It is reported that the unit traveled within Europe and Africa, providing a flypast on Queen Elizabeth II's accession, and being in Kenya at the time of the Mau Mau action. Flight, reporting the squadron's move to Singapore in its issue of 15 April 1955, said the squadron had visited many of the stations in the MEAF area. It had also gained a reputation for sports prowess: "..throughout its tour, its rugby team remained unbeaten." During its stay in Cyprus it was commanded by Squadron Leaders S.M. Hope and N.H. Bright.

A Vampire FB5 in 14 Squadron colours is displayed in the atrium of the Air Force Museum of New Zealand (Royal New Zealand Air Force Museum) in Wigram, Christchurch.

In May 1955 14 Squadron moved to Singapore and re-equipped with sixteen de Havilland Venoms, a development of the Vampire. No. 14 Squadron operated from Singapore against Indonesian-backed communist insurgents in what is now Malaysia until relieved by No. 75 Squadron RNZAF English Electric Canberras in May 1958. A privately owned Venom still flies in 14 Squadron colours.

After receiving nine B(I)12 and two T.13 English Electric Canberras at Ohakea in 1959, 14 Squadron deployed to Singapore in September 1964 to defend Singapore and Malaysia at the end of the Indonesia-Malaysia confrontation (following in the footsteps of No. 75 Squadron RNZAF's Canberra B.2s). No 14 Squadron operated from RAF Tengah with detachments to Labuan (North Borneo) October/November 1964, RAF Gong Kedak (Malayan Peninsular) June 1965 and RAF Kai Tak (Hong Kong) October 1966. The Squadron returned to Ohakea in November 1966. The Canberras were phased out of service in July 1970 and sold to the Indian Air Force.

One Canberra is stored at Wigram awaiting restoration.

=== Advanced training role ===
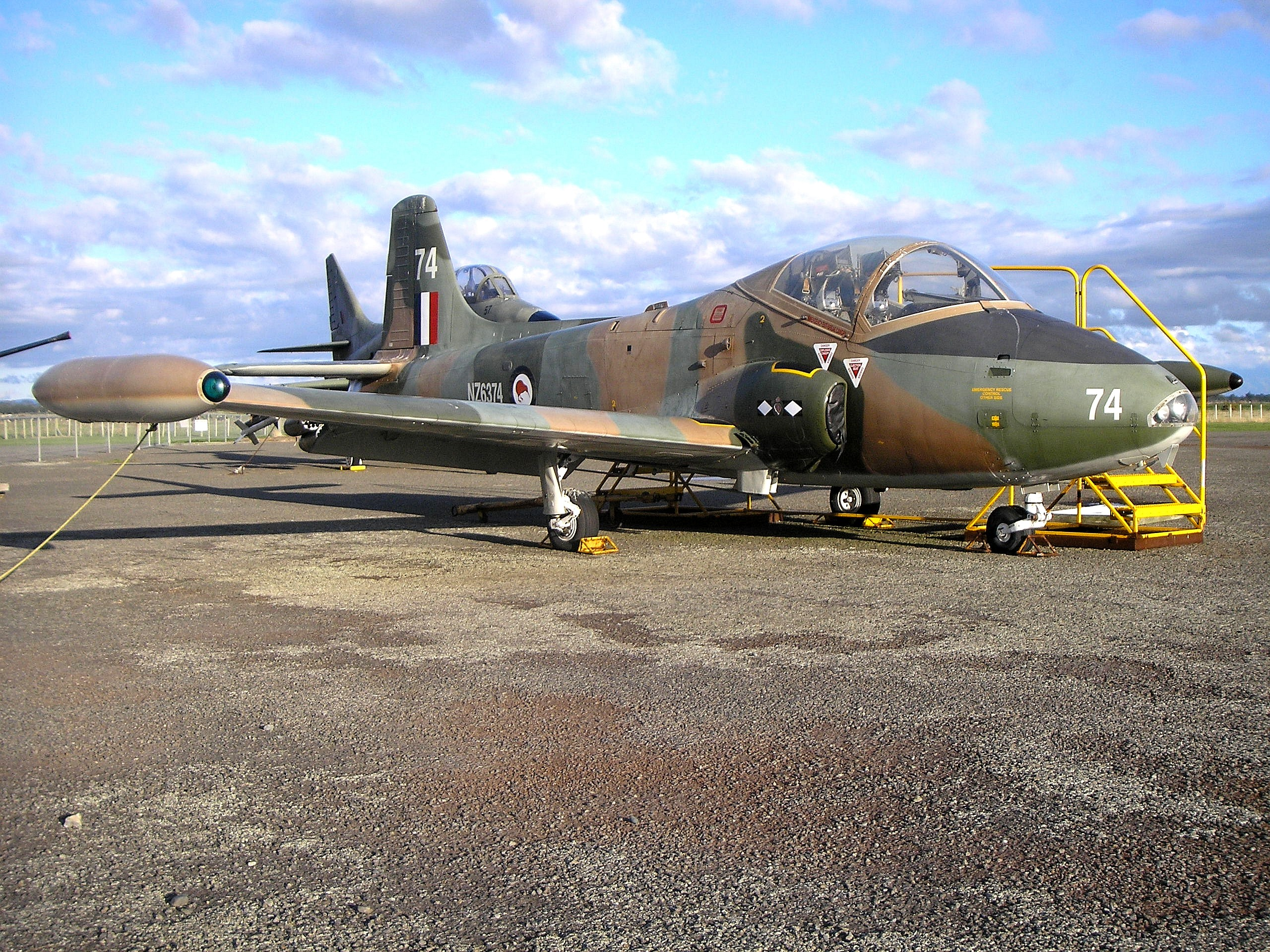
A BAC Strikemaster Mk.88 which served with 14 Squadron from 1975 to 1993. It was photographed in May 2007 at Ohakea.

No. 14 Squadron took up the role of advanced training. It briefly operated a small number (up to four) of two-seat A-4 Skyhawks and two-seat T.11 Vampires before re-equipping with 16 BAC Strikemasters (colloquially "Blunties," in comparison to the pointed nose of the Skyhawks) in 1972. The Strikemasters were replaced by 18 Aermacchi MB 339CBs in 1991. A Strikemaster was previously displayed at the Royal New Zealand Air Force Museum's Ohakea wing, but is currently stored in the 42 Squadron hangar at Ohakea with a TA-4K Skyhawk. Five more are held in storage.

New Zealand's defence budget was pressured by involvement in East Timor, and a decade of failing to match inflationary costs. The price of maintaining fast jets was increasingly criticised by Treasury and opposition political parties; prominent Labour politician Helen Clark was ideologically opposed to combat aircraft. On the election of the Fifth Labour Government, the purchase of 28 F-16 Fighting Falcons was scrapped, and the existing A4 Skyhawks and Aermacchis retired. Together with the other RNZAF fast jet units, No 14 Squadron was disbanded on 13 December 2001. A contract to sell the 17 surviving Aermacchis was signed in September 2005. The purchaser is a private US pilot training firm, which announced it will continue to operate them in their RNZAF squadron colours, sans national markings. A deal to sell the remaining Aermacchi trainers and A-4K Skyhawks was finally reached when Draken International purchased 8 Aermacchis and 9 Skyhawks in 2013. The remaining aircraft were given away to museums and collectors in both New Zealand and Australia.

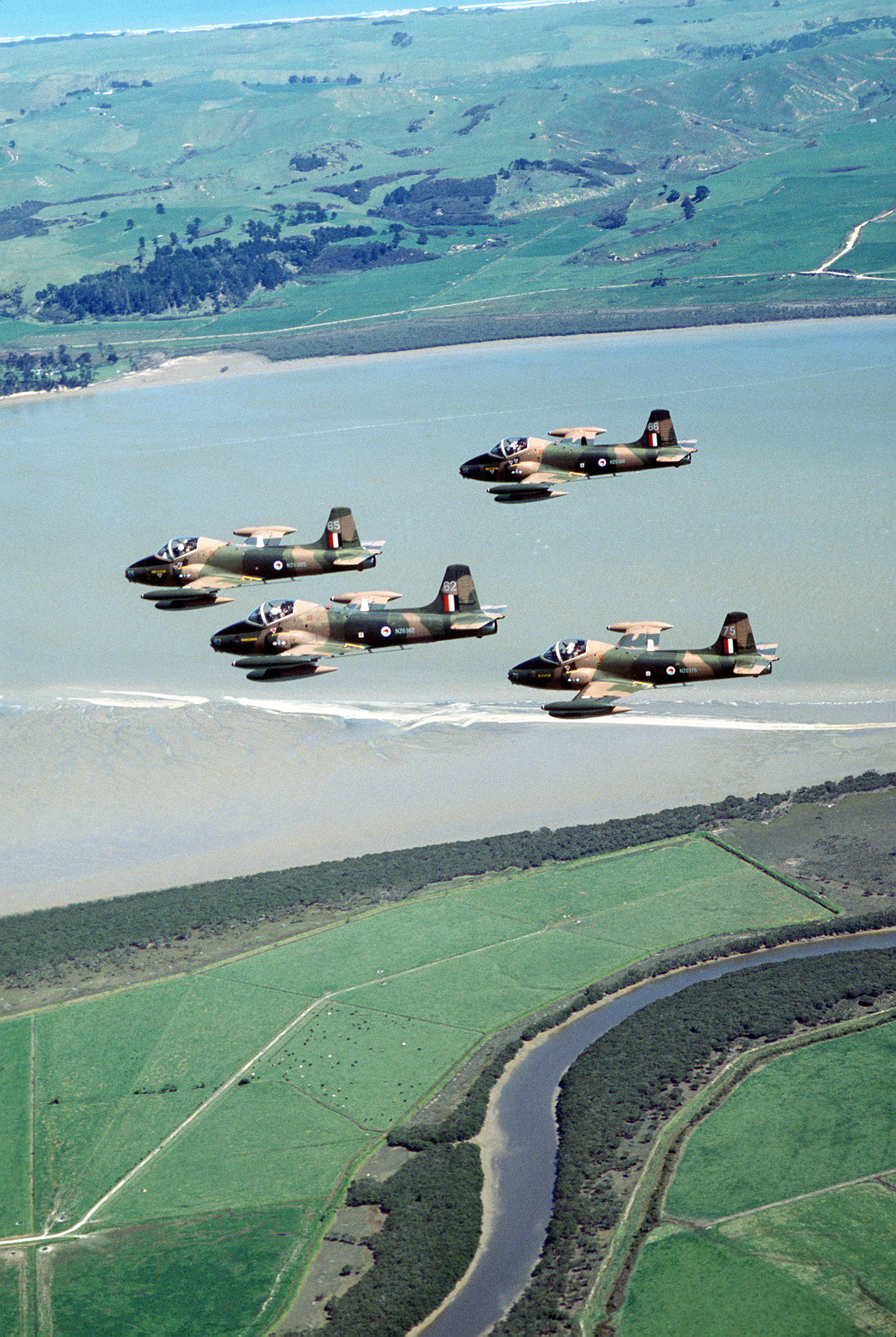
RNZAF Strikemasters in 1984

=== Reformation ===
The squadron was re-raised to operate the RNZAF's Beechcraft T-6C Texan II training aircraft. The previous training aircraft, the Airtrainer CT/4E, were operated by Pilot Training Squadron RNZAF, and the reformation of 14 Squadron meant the end to that unit. Deliveries of the type began in 2015, and No. 14 Squadron began its first pilot training course a year later.

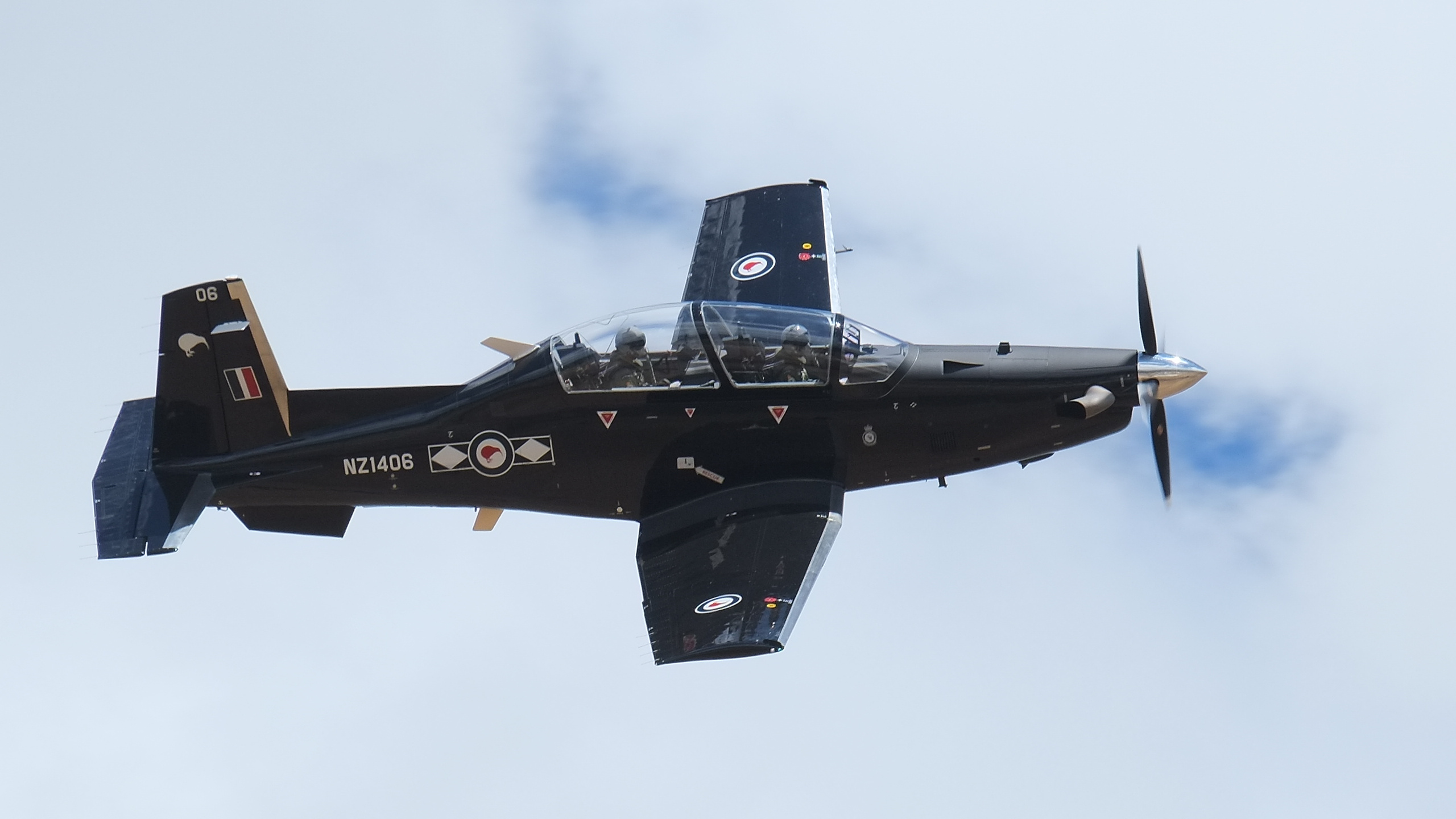
Beechcraft T-6 Texan II of No 14 Squadron

== Bibliography ==
- Bentley, Geoffrey (1969). RNZAF – A Short History (Hardback). Wellington: A.H. & A. W. Reed. pp. 268 pages.
- Ewing, Ross & MacPherson, Ross. The History of New Zealand Aviation. Auckland, New Zealand: Heinemann, 1986.
- Flintham, Vic and Andrew Thomas. Combat Codes: A full explanation and listing of British, Commonwealth and Allied air force unit codes since 1938. Shrewsbury, Shropshire, UK: Airlife Publishing Ltd., 2003. ISBN 1-84037-281-8.
- Halley, James J. The Squadrons of the Royal Air Force & Commonwealth 1918–1988. Tonbridge, Kent, UK: Air Britain (Historians) Ltd., 1988. ISBN 0-85130-164-9.
- Horn, Alex. Wings over the Pacific, The RNZAF in the Pacific Air War. Auckland, New Zealand: Random Century, 1992. ISBN 1-86941-152-8.
- McClure, Margaret (2012). Fighting Spirit – 75 Years of the RNZAF (Hardback). Auckland: Random House. pp. 336 pages. ISBN 978-1-86979-610-5.
- Stenman, Kari; Thomas, Andrew (2013). Brewster F2A Buffalo Aces of World War 2. 9781472804563. ISBN 978-1-84603-481-7.
