= Tengah Air Base =

Military airbase of the Republic of Singapore Air Force

Tengah Air Base Pangkalan Udara Tengah (Malay) 登加空軍基地 (Chinese) தெங்கா வான்படைத் தளம் (Tamil)
- Badge of the Tengah Air Base
- IATA: TGA; ICAO: WSAT

Summary
- Airport type: Military airbase
- Owner: Government of Singapore
- Operator: Republic of Singapore Air Force
- Location: Western Water Catchment, Singapore
- Elevation AMSL: 15.24 m (50.0 ft)
- Coordinates: 01°23′15″N 103°42′30″E
- Interactive map of Tengah Air Base

Runways
Direction	Length		Surface
Direction	m	ft	Surface
18/36	2,743	8,999	Asphalt
- Source: CAAS - Civil Aviation Authority of Singapore

Tengah Air Base (IATA: TGA, ICAO: WSAT) is a military airbase of the Republic of Singapore Air Force (RSAF) located at the Western Water Catchment in the western part of Singapore. It is the most significant airfield operated by the RSAF, as it hosts the bulk of its fixed wing frontline squadrons. The base is home to most of the RSAF's airborne early warning and control (AEWC) assets, its F-16C/D Fighting Falcons as well as a large proportion of its UAVs.

The air base carries the motto Always Vigilant, reflected in its primary motif of a black knight chess piece, which symbolises constant readiness and operational alertness. The accompanying sword represents the heraldic sword of war, while the castle signifies the state and its defence. Before Singapore's independence, the site operated as a flying Royal Air Force station known as RAF Tengah. The base is currently undergoing expansion to accommodate additional aircraft, equipment and infrastructure following the planned full decommissioning of Paya Lebar Airbase in the 2030s.

== History ==
=== RAF Tengah ===
RAF Tengah Station Badge

RAF Tengah was opened in 1939 with a grass landing ground. Tengah airfield was the target of carpet bombing when 17 Japanese Navy bombers conducted the first air raid on Singapore, shortly after the Battle of Malaya began. Construction of a 1,400 yard concrete began in 1941, and it was completed in January 1942. During the construction, it had been found that the ground was unstable where in the course of deep clay fill, lenses of water were trapped. As a result, the completion was delayed for establishing a firm subgrade for the runway and surrounding field. RAF Tengah had permanent accommodation for supporting two squadrons, and facilities including a sick quarters, permanent operations block, and temporary bomb and aviation petrol storage.

In a 1990 memoir, former Royal Air Force (RAF) pilot Terence O'Brien described leading (in late December 1941) a flight of Lockheed Hudsons from Britain to Singapore, which was already under attack by the time he and his aircrews arrived at Tengah. He noted that only eight "of us out of the twenty who set off" from Britain for Singapore survived the Far East campaign. Tengah had already been under air attack by the Japanese, but he said it was easy to imagine the once elegant, but now badly damaged, officers' mess just a few weeks before their arrival. He said it:

. . . stood proud on a grassy slope to the south of the field, from the terrace you looked over the lush green grass, then a smooth-topped expanse of rubber plantation stretched away to misty blue hills . . . You could picture officers and guests out there on mess nights chatting under the Southern Cross . . . the strains of a waltz coming from the dance band in the spacious lounge brilliantly lit and aswirl in colour. Now, a month later and into war, all that was gone forever. Many of the windows were now empty of glass, so the rain came misting through in the frequent tropical showers . . . There was no longer any door at all on the room allotted to Peter and me . . .

Not long after their arrival, O'Brien and his Hudsons departed Singapore just ahead of the conquering Japanese.

Tengah was the first airfield to be captured when Japanese forces invaded Singapore. After the Japanese completed their capture of Singapore, Tengah came under the control of the Imperial Japanese Army Air Force while the Imperial Japanese Navy Air Service took over the other two RAF stations of Sembawang Air Base and RAF Seletar as Singapore was split into north–south sphere of control. This effectively ensured that the Japanese Army took control of the south, including the administrative hub and population centre of Singapore City, while the Japanese Navy took command of the north, which included the Royal Navy dockyard at Sembawang.

The base was home to 11, 17, 20, 28, 32, 33, 34, 39, 45, 60, 62, 64, 74, 81, 84, 103, 136, 152, 155, 204, 242 & 258 RAF squadrons during its lifetime.

=== Malayan Emergency ===
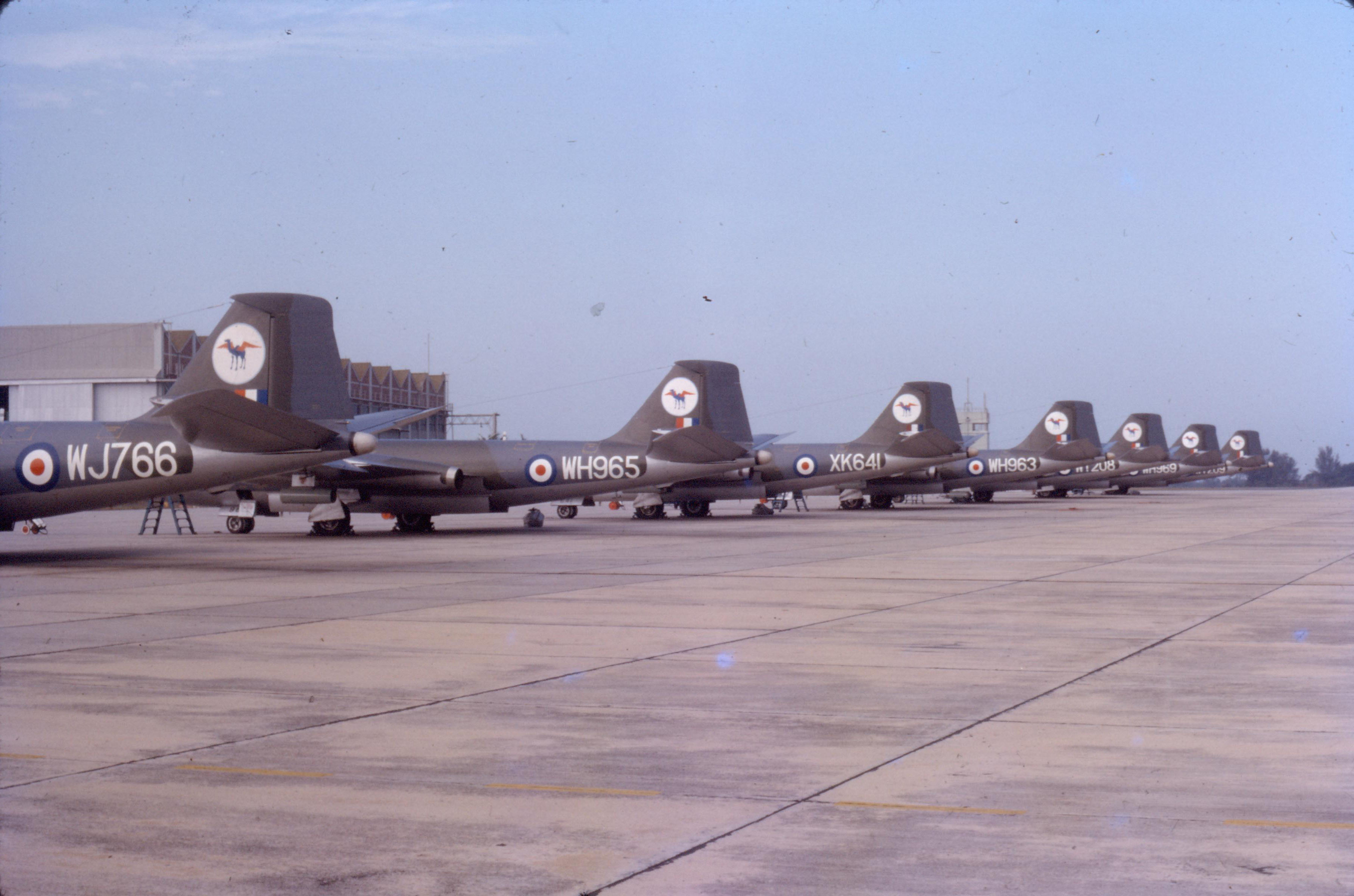
A fleet of English Electric Canberra operated by No. 45 Squadron RAF at Tengah

During the Malayan Emergency, Tengah was used to house Avro Lincolns of the RAF and Royal Australian Air Force and Bristol Brigands of No. 84 Squadron RAF which performed bombing sorties against pro-independence forces led by the Malayan National Liberation Army (MNLA), led by the Malayan Communist Party (MCP) deep in the jungles of Peninsular Malaysia. In 1952 45 Squadron was equipped with de Havilland Hornets and re-equipped with Venoms in 1955 at RAF Butterworth when it was amalgamated with 33 Squadron T.11's of 60 Squadron, joined by 14 Squadron of the Royal New Zealand Air Force. In 1958 they were joined by 45 Squadron and No. 75 Squadron RNZAF, both equipped with English Electric Canberra B.2. The RAAF retained their Lincolns, with 1 Squadron, until the end of the emergency.

=== Konfrontasi ===
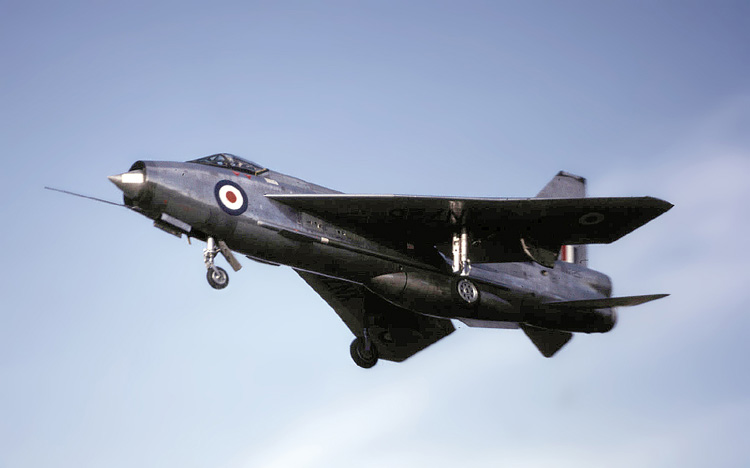
An English Electric Lightning F.3 similar to those operated by No. 74 Squadron RAF at Tengah

During the period of Indonesia–Malaysia confrontation, 20 Squadron with its Hawker Hunter fighter aircraft in addition to the Gloster Javelins of 60 Squadron and 64 Squadron, were based on the airfield to help upgrade the air defence of Singapore and Peninsula Malaysia against infrequent air incursions from the Mikoyan-Gurevich MiG-21s and North American P-51 Mustangs of the Indonesian Air Force. 74 Squadron English Electric Lightnings were deployed following Confrontation to replace the Javelins of 64 Squadron.

On 3 September 1964, an Indonesian Air Force Lockheed C-130 Hercules crashed into the Straits of Malacca while trying to evade interception by a Javelin FAW.9 of No 60 Squadron. On 30 April 1968, the Gloster Javelins of No 60 Squadron flew their last RAF operational sorties from Tengah and the squadron was disbanded the same day.

=== V bomber detachment ===
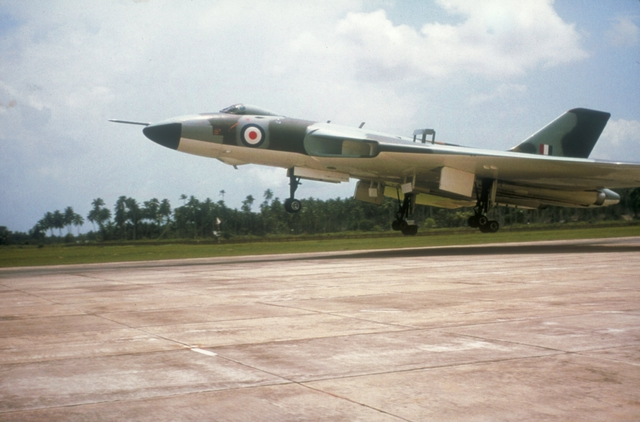
An Avro Vulcan B.2 bomber touching down, a detachment of these bombers were deployed to Tengah and Butterworth during the period of Indonesia–Malaysia confrontation

As a show of force to deter the Indonesian President Sukarno from launching an all-out war during this period, the RAF also deployed a V bomber force detachment to Tengah in the form of Handley Page Victor B.1A bombers from 15 Squadron in August 1963, which was rotated with those dispersed to RAAF Butterworth in Malaysia. The detachment of Victor bombers was replaced in October 1964 by a detachment of Avro Vulcan B.2 bombers from 12 Squadron, these were subsequently pulled back to RAF Cottesmore in December that same year. In August 1965, 9 Squadron resumed RAF's Vulcan bomber detachment to Tengah, followed by 35 Squadron in December 1965, these were in turn replaced by 9 Squadron again in February 1966. After June 1966, 9 Squadron returned to Cottesmore following the end of the confrontation.

According to British MoD documents declassified in 2000, up to 48 Red Beard tactical nuclear weapons were secretly stowed in a highly secured weapons storage facility at Tengah, between 1962 and 1970, for possible use by the V bomber force detachment and 45 Sqn Canberras for Britain's military commitment to South East Asia Treaty Organization (SEATO).

=== British withdrawal ===
The RAF station closed at the end of March 1971 and Tengah was handed over to the Singapore Air Defence Command (later the Republic of Singapore Air Force) by 1973, after the British withdrawal following its defence cuts. Despite this, the airfield continued to host British and Commonwealth air forces and troops under the auspices of the Five Power Defence Arrangements (FPDA) until 1976. The RAAF completely pulled out of Tengah in 1983.

=== Tengah Air Base ===
It was renamed RSAF Tengah in 1971 (then it became Tengah Air Base (TAB)), when it was handed over to the Singapore Air Defence Command (SADC). Currently, the air base houses aircraft such as the Lockheed Martin F-16C/D Fighting Falcons and will house the F-35As and F-35Bs by the 2030s.

In 2017, it was announced that all RSAF assets and equipment located in Paya Lebar Air Base will be moved to Tengah Air Base. Tengah Air Base will be expanded by acquiring 50,000 graves in the Choa Chu Kang Cemetery and 80 neighbouring farms/agricultural businesses. Military training areas* will be rationalised, such as the closure of Murai Urban Training Facility. A new runway will be built on the expanded portion of the base.

A RSAF50 parade took place on 1 September 2018 at TAB. The parade featured almost 500 personnel in a march-past, mobile column and a Salute-to-the-Nation flypast involving 20 aircraft. The new Multi-Role Tanker Transport (MRTT) aircraft made its maiden public appearance. The static display also showcased both retired and present aircraft.

On 8 May 2024, an F-16 crashed shortly after takeoff, the pilot ejected with minor injuries. It was later determined that the crash was caused by an extremely rare malfunction of the pitch rate gyroscopes.

On 8 June 2025, the adjacent Lim Chu Kang Road was closed for the base expansion. It was replaced by a new stretch of Lim Chu Kang Road further west.

== Organisation ==
Emblem of the RSAF Black Knights.

=== Flying Squadrons ===
The Flying Squadrons based in Tengah Air Base are:

- 111 Squadron with 4 G550 CAEW
- 140 Squadron with 12 F-16C/D
- 143 Squadron with 12 F-16C/D
- 145 Squadron with 20 F-16D+ BLK 52
- RSAF Black Knights – the official RSAF Aerobatic team with F-16Cs from various squadrons.

=== UAV Squadrons ===
The Flying Squadrons based in Tengah Air Base are:

- 116 Squadron with H-450

=== Support Squadrons ===
The Support Squadrons based in Tengah Air Base are:

- Flying Support Squadron – 205 Squadron
- Airbase Civil Engineering Squadron – 505 Squadron
- Field Defence Squadron – 605 Squadron
- Air Base Sustainment Squadron – 705 Squadron
- Aircraft Operational Maintenance Squadron – 805 Squadron
- Aircraft Specialist Maintenance Squadron – 815 Squadron

=== Former Flying Squadrons ===
- 142 Squadron with 16 A-4SU Super Skyhawk before the squadron was disbanded in 1997. The squadron was reestablished in 2016 at Paya Lebar Air Base.

== Exercises ==
The RSAF regularly conducts Exercise Torrent which converts the neighboring Lim Chu Kang road into an alternative runway since its inception in April 1986. Its purpose is to demonstrate the RSAF capability of generating air power in the shortest time from public roads. The seventh and last edition was held from the 10 to 13 November 2016.

== Gallery ==
An aerial view of the RAF Tengah taken in 1953

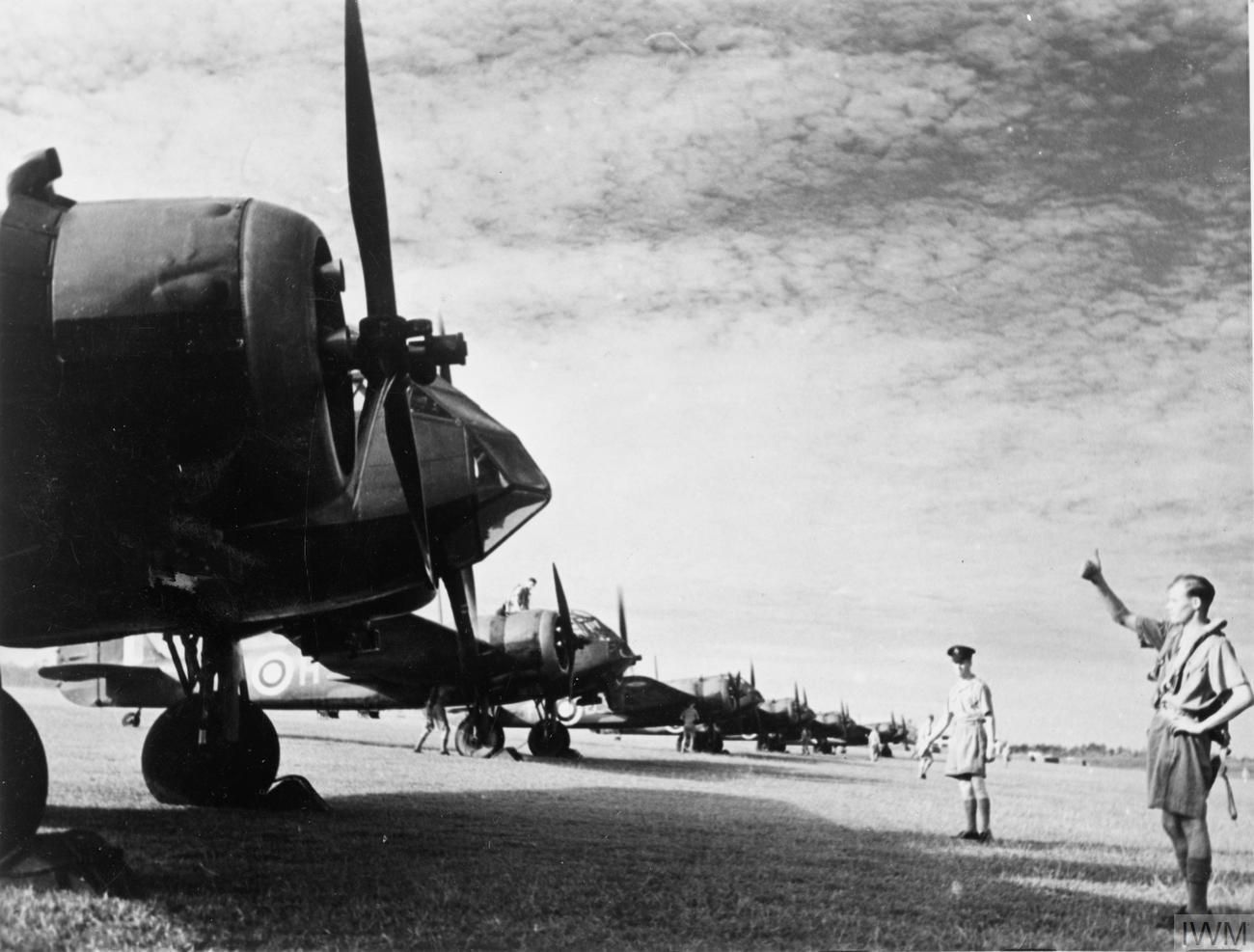
Bristol Blenheim Mk Is of No. 62 Squadron RAF lined up at RAF Tengah, February 1941

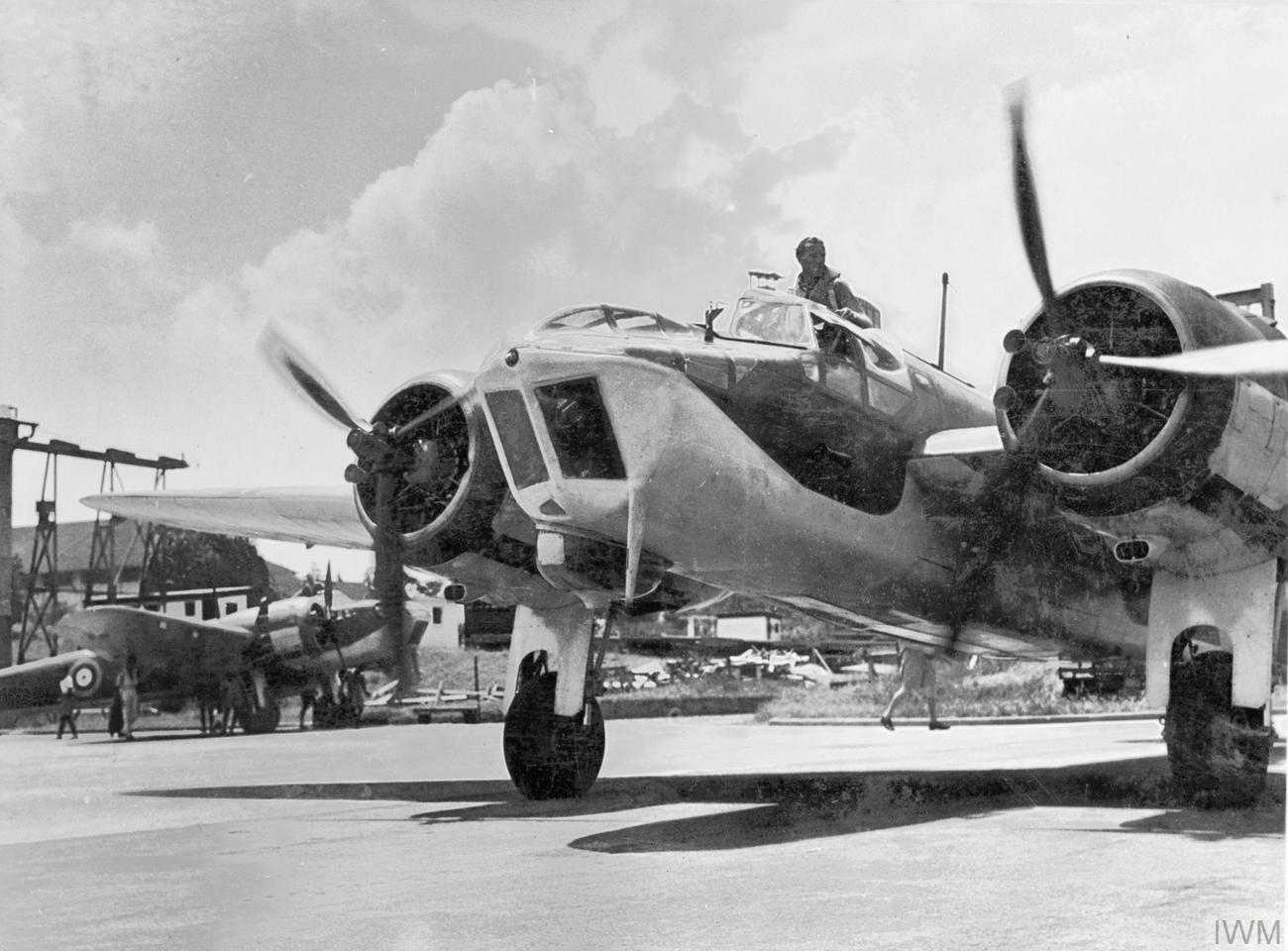
Bristol Blenheim Mk IV bombers at RAF Tengah, June 1941

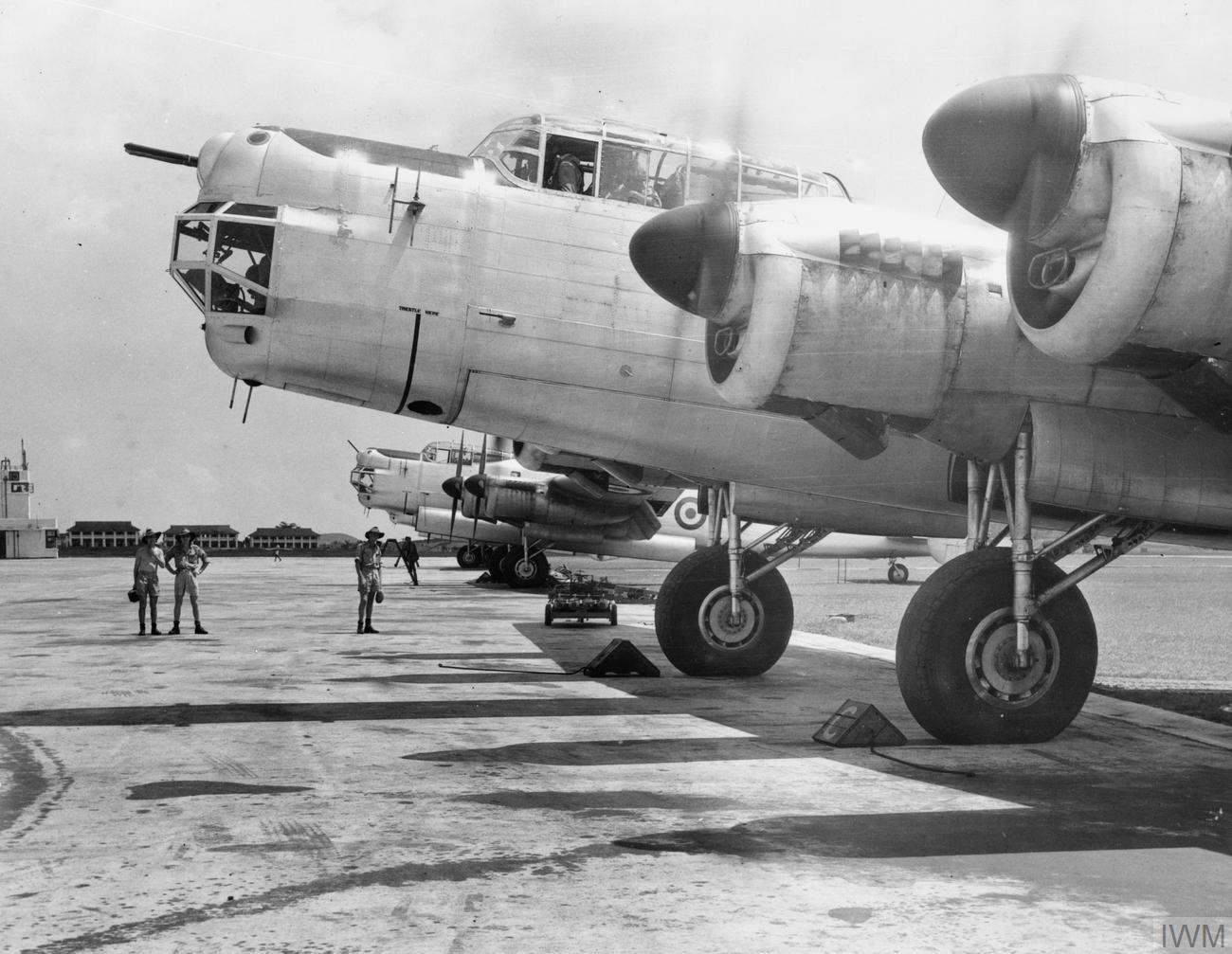
The first operation of No. 1 Squadron, Royal Australian Air Force from RAF Tengah, August 1950

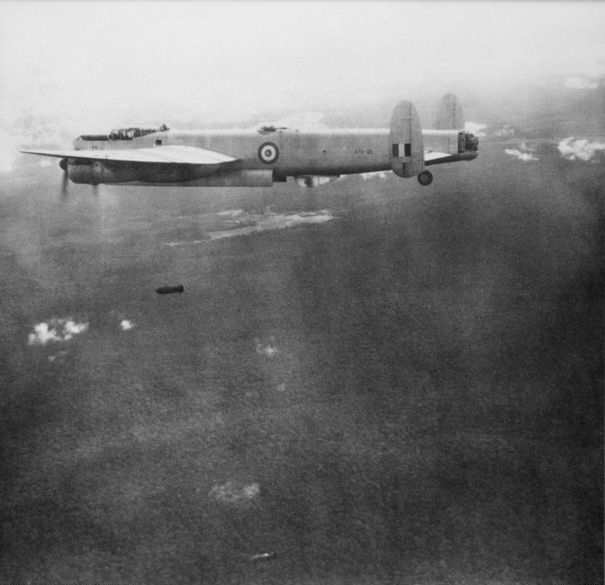
An Avro Lincoln bomber of No 1(B) Bomber squadron dropping 500-pound (230 kg) bombs on Communist targets during the Malayan Emergency

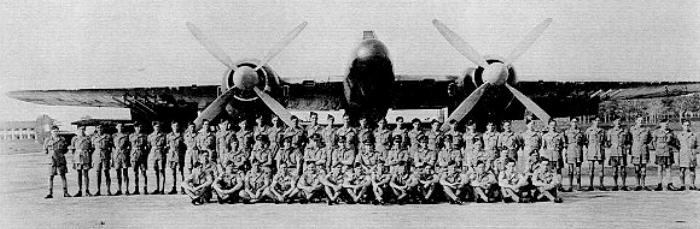
Members of No. 45 Squadron RAF posing for the camera in front of a Bristol Brigand at RAF Tengah, in 1950

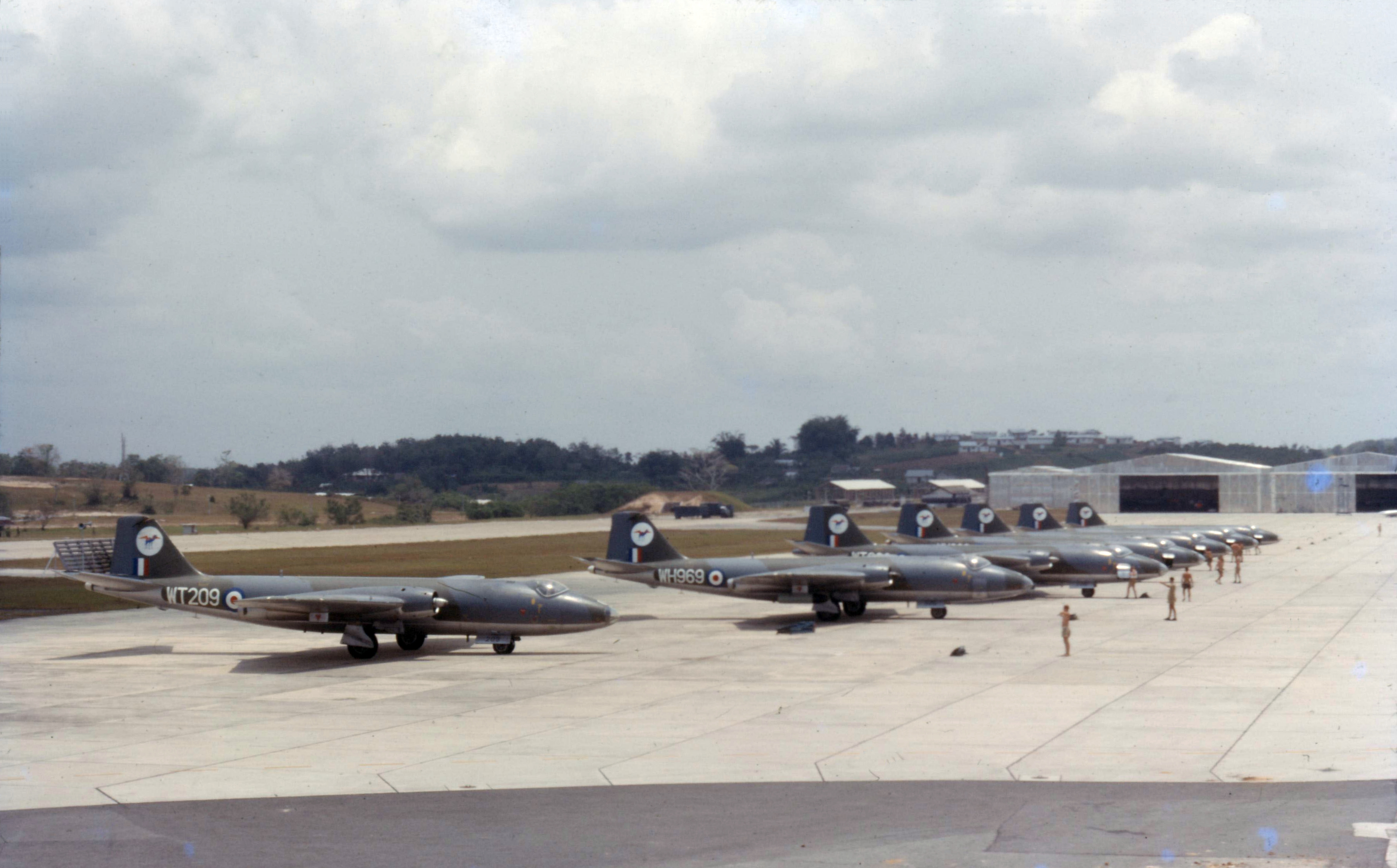
English Electric Canberra B.15 of No. 45 Squadron at RAF Tengah, Singapore, in 1963

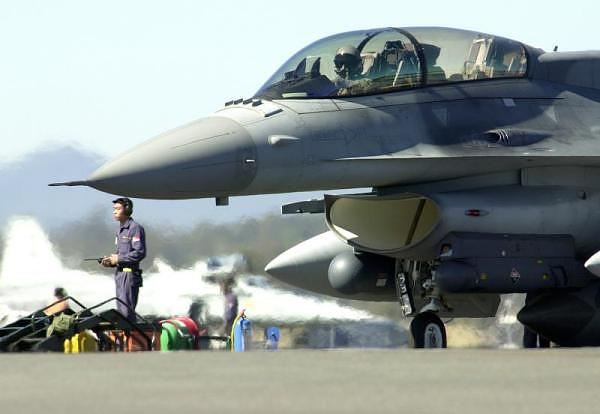
RSAF F-16D prepares for flight

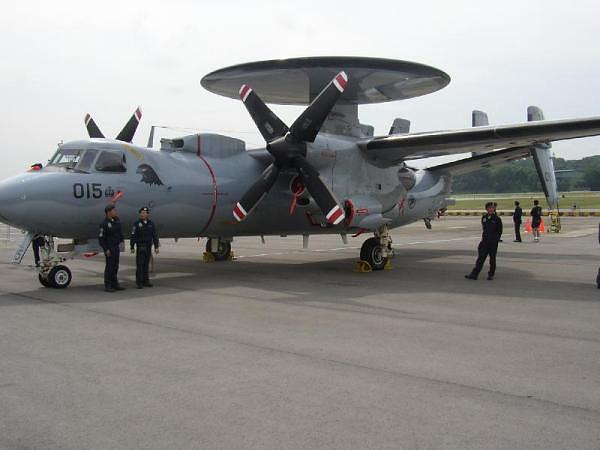
RSAF 111Sqn's E-2C Hawkeye

== See also ==
- Republic of Singapore Air Force
- Singapore strategy
- British Far East Command
- Far East Air Force (Royal Air Force)
- Far East Strategic Reserve
- Former overseas RAF bases
- Battle of Singapore
- Malayan Emergency
- Bristol Brigands - No 84 Squadron at RAF Tengah during the Malayan Emergency
- Indonesia–Malaysia confrontation
