= No. 75 Squadron RNZAF =

New Zealand air combat squadron

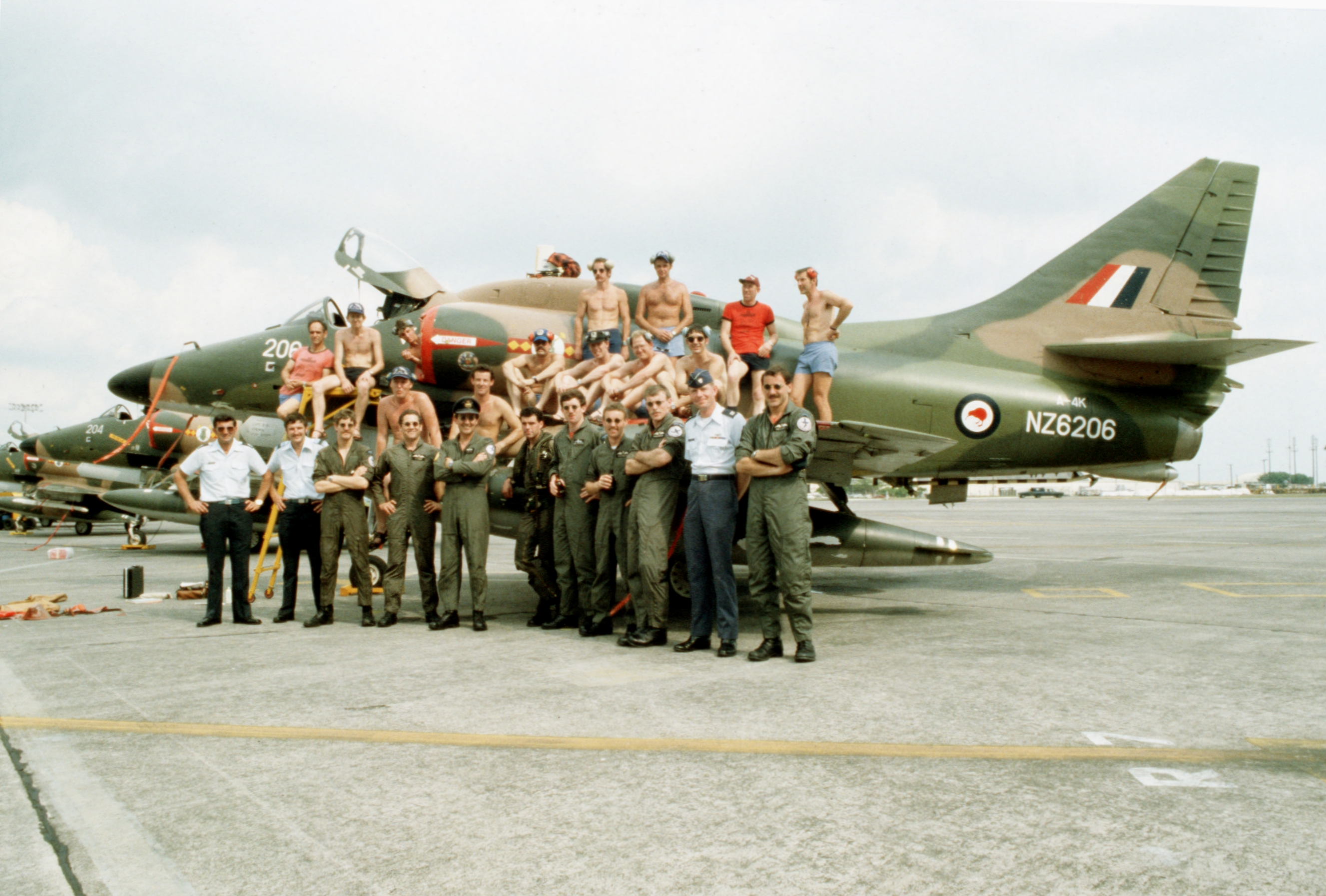
- Members of No. 75 Squadron RNZAF with one of the unit's A-4K Skyhawks in the Philippines during Cope Thunder in 1982
- Active: 1 October 1946 – 13 December 2001
- Country: New Zealand
- Branch: Royal New Zealand Air Force
- Role: Bomber; Fighter-attack
- Garrison/HQ: RNZAF Base Ohakea
- Mottos: Ake Ake Kia Kaha (For ever and ever be strong)
- Colours: Yellow and red
- Mascot: Tiki
- Anniversaries: 1 October 1946
- Equipment: A-4 Skyhawk
- Engagements: World War II; Malayan Emergency

Insignia
- Squadron Badge: Tiki in front of two crossed mining hammers in saltire

No. 75 Squadron RNZAF was an air combat squadron of the Royal New Zealand Air Force (RNZAF). It was formed from the RAF's World War II bomber squadron, No. 75 Squadron, which had been initially equipped by the New Zealand government and was largely manned by New Zealanders. The squadron was created when, in a unique gesture, the squadron number, colours and battle honours were transferred to the RNZAF in 1946. It had flown more sorties and suffered more casualties than any other in the European theatre.

The squadron ceased to exist on 13 December 2001, when the RNZAF Air Combat Force, comprising Nos 2, 14, and 75 Squadrons, was officially disbanded.

== History ==
=== No. 75 RFC / RAF History ===
No. 75 Squadron Royal Flying Corps (later RAF) was formed as a home defence fighter unit on 1 October 1916 but disbanded in June 1919 following the end of World War I. The squadron reformed at RAF Feltwell in Norfolk on 15 March 1937 as part of the RAF expansion in the mid-1930s, with transfer of pilots from No. 215 Squadron RAF, being equipped with four Vickers Virginias and seven Avro Ansons for bomber training. The squadron later operated Handley Page Harrows which were replaced by Ansons in 1939, operating again in a training role alongside No 15 Operational Training Unit. Meanwhile, the New Zealand government had ordered 30 modern Vickers Wellington bombers to replace its Vickers Vildebeests in New Zealand. Aircrew were sent to England to train on these new aircraft under the supervision of a RNZAF officer, Wing Commander Maurice Buckley, before flying them back to New Zealand.

=== 75 (NZ) Squadron ===
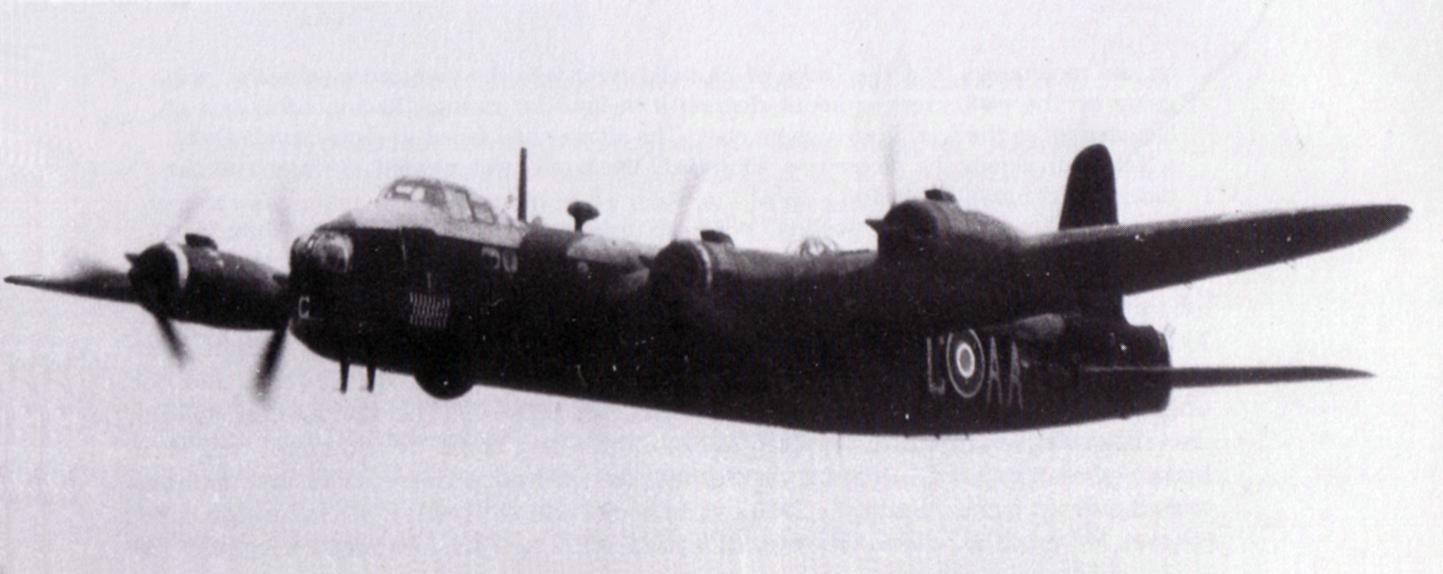
Short Stirling marked with No.75 Squadron code 'AA-C'

In August 1939, with war seeming increasingly likely, the New Zealand government offered to place both men and machines at the disposal of Britain. They were allocated the "75" squadron number and the squadron officially became No. 75 (New Zealand) Squadron, RAF on 4 April 1940. It was one of the first of the "bracket" squadrons. Ultimately, six other New Zealand Article XV squadrons, as well as many from other countries, were formed within the RAF, until the practice ceased in 1942. These squadrons were usually formed around aircrews from a particular allied or exile state, replacement aircrew where possible coming from that state as well, although most ground crew were British.

=== World War II ===
The squadron was progressively equipped with Wellingtons, Short Stirlings, Avro Lancasters and finally Avro Lincolns, which it was preparing to take to the Far East as part of Tiger Force when Japan surrendered. Some have claimed that No 75 Squadron it to be the only squadron engaged constantly against Germany from 1939 to VE day. However, as the 75 (NZ) Sqn only stood up in April 1940, this is not correct. It flew more sorties than any other RAF heavy bomber unit, suffered more casualties than any other squadron, and dropped the second-largest weight of bombs. A pilot of the Squadron was awarded a VC in 1941, Sergeant James Allen Ward climbed along the wing of a Wellington in flight, in an attempt to extinguish a fire from an engine after a night fighter attack.

No 75(NZ) Squadron RAF saw action early over France, Norway and most other European nations, but principally against Germany. The squadron was part of the first major bombing raid on Germany, a night raid on oil infrastructure in the Ruhr on 15 May 1940. In September that year the squadron took part in the first large-scale bombing of Berlin.

In March 1944, No. 75(NZ) Sqn began to exchange its Stirlings for Lancaster III's and was ready in time to participate in preparation and support of the Allied invasion, the bombing of flying-bomb sites and close-support of the armies. A Lancaster, (ND917), a Mark III captained by Squadron Leader N A Williamson, RNZAF, on 30 June 1944 became the first British heavy bomber to land in Normandy after the invasion began. The Lancaster was returning from an attack on Villers Bocage in support of the Army when Williamson landed on one of the newly laid landing strips on the beach-head to seek medical aid for his flight engineer who had been wounded by flak.

An unusual sortie for 75(NZ) Squadron was the high altitude run over The Hague in March 1945 by a lone Lancaster piloted by Flight Lieutenant H W Hooper. He dropped thousands of leaflets containing an apology from the British government for the earlier Allied bombing of the city which had been an error.

=== 75 Squadron RNZAF ===
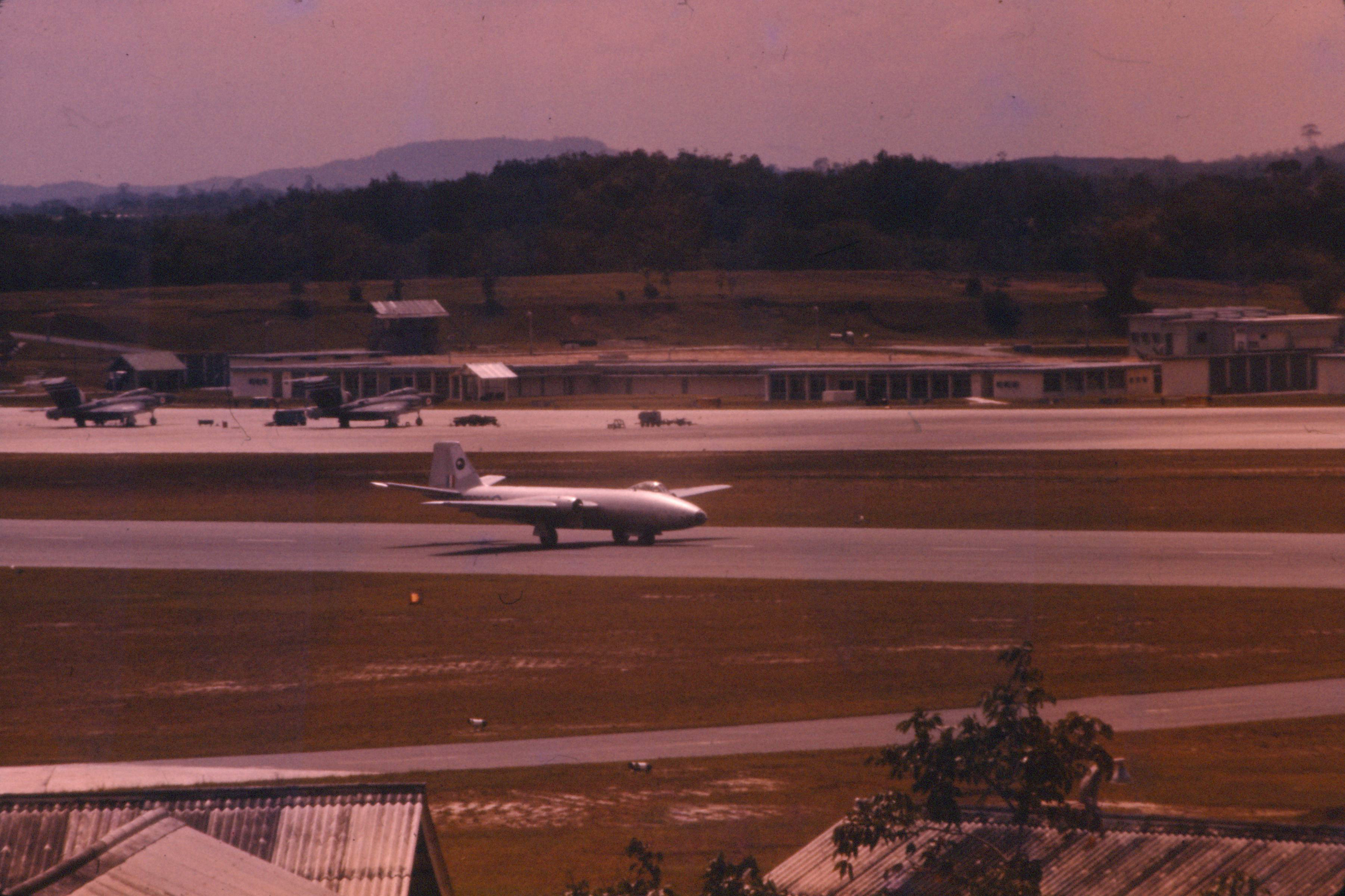
Undated photo of 75 Squadron Canberra B(I).12 at Tengah in Singapore (after 1964). RAF Javelin fighters visible in the background.

In recognition of their wartime record, in October 1946 the RAF officially handed over the 75 Squadron title and badge to the RNZAF. This is the only occasion that the RAF has “gifted” a Squadron title and badge to another Commonwealth Air Force and is a tribute to the sacrifices and contribution made by all New Zealanders in the RAF during World War II.

The post-World War II squadron reformed at RNZAF Base Ohakea from No. 2 Squadron RNZAF. It was initially equipped with twin-engine de Havilland Mosquito fighter/bombers. In 1950 and 1952 the squadron's Mosquito's sank two ships (for target practice), the barque Lutterworth with bombs in 1950 and the Arahura with rockets in 1952. The unit operated de Havilland Vampires from 1951 to 1970 out of Ohakea.

In February 1958 Her Majesty Queen Elizabeth the Queen Mother presented No. 75 Squadron with its Squadron Standard, the squadron having earned the Sovereign's appreciation for outstanding service. Fourteen Battle Honours were awarded, eight of which are depicted on the Standard.

From 1958 to 1962 the squadron operated nine English Electric Canberras, on loan from the RAF, out of RAF Tengah, Singapore. They were used to attack communist guerrillas of the Malayan National Liberation Army during the Malayan Emergency.

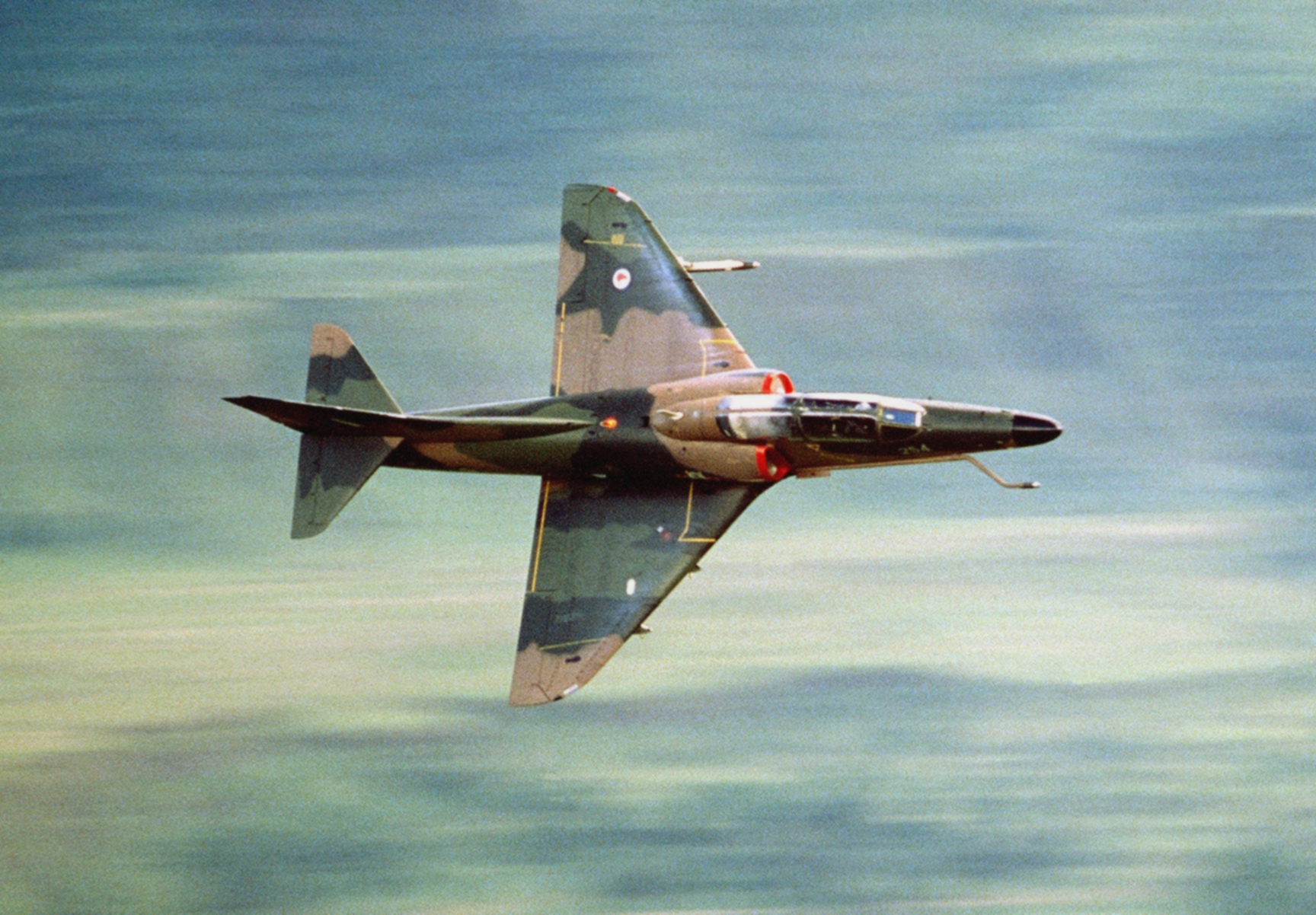
No. 75 Sqn. TA-4K in 1984 during Exercise Cope Thunder

In 1970 14 McDonnell Douglas A-4 Skyhawks were purchased to replace the Vampire FB5s of 75 Sqn – which was the primary attack squadron for the RNZAF. Ten were single-seat A-4Ks, and four twin-seat TA-4Ks. Early in their life all of the aircraft were modified with cranked refuelling probes. In 1984, the NZ Government bought another 10 A-4s from the Australian Navy, and in 1988–89, the Skyhawk fleet underwent Project KAHU which upgraded the avionics systems. The squadron's former Royal Australian Navy A-4G aircraft were then re-designated A-4K/TA-4K. In 1994 a major escape system change was initiated to fit the UPCO SIII3S-ER ejection seat to replace the MDD EScapac1G3.

In 1998, the National Party under Prime Minister Jenny Shipley then decided to replace the A-4 Skyhawks with 28 General Dynamics F-16 Fighting Falcon Block 15 surplus aircraft from the US in 1998. However, in 1999, a year later, the Fifth Labour Government of New Zealand under Prime Minister Helen Clark was elected. Clark had totally different views on defence policy, having been an anti-war protester herself. Her government decided to remove all attack aircraft from the RNZAF, and the Skyhawks were removed from service and the squadron disbanded in December 2001.

A small number of 75 Squadron personnel deployed to Vietnam and flew with a US Marine Corps Squadron VMA-311.

The Squadron deployed to Clark Air Base, in the Philippines and Hawaii with the Skyhawks several times from 1971 to exercise with the United States Air Force as part of Exercise Cope Thunder. The annual deployments as part of the Five Power Defence Arrangements called Exercise Vanguard, had the Squadron visit Singapore, Malaysia and Thailand to exercise with those countries, Australia, and the United Kingdom until 2001.

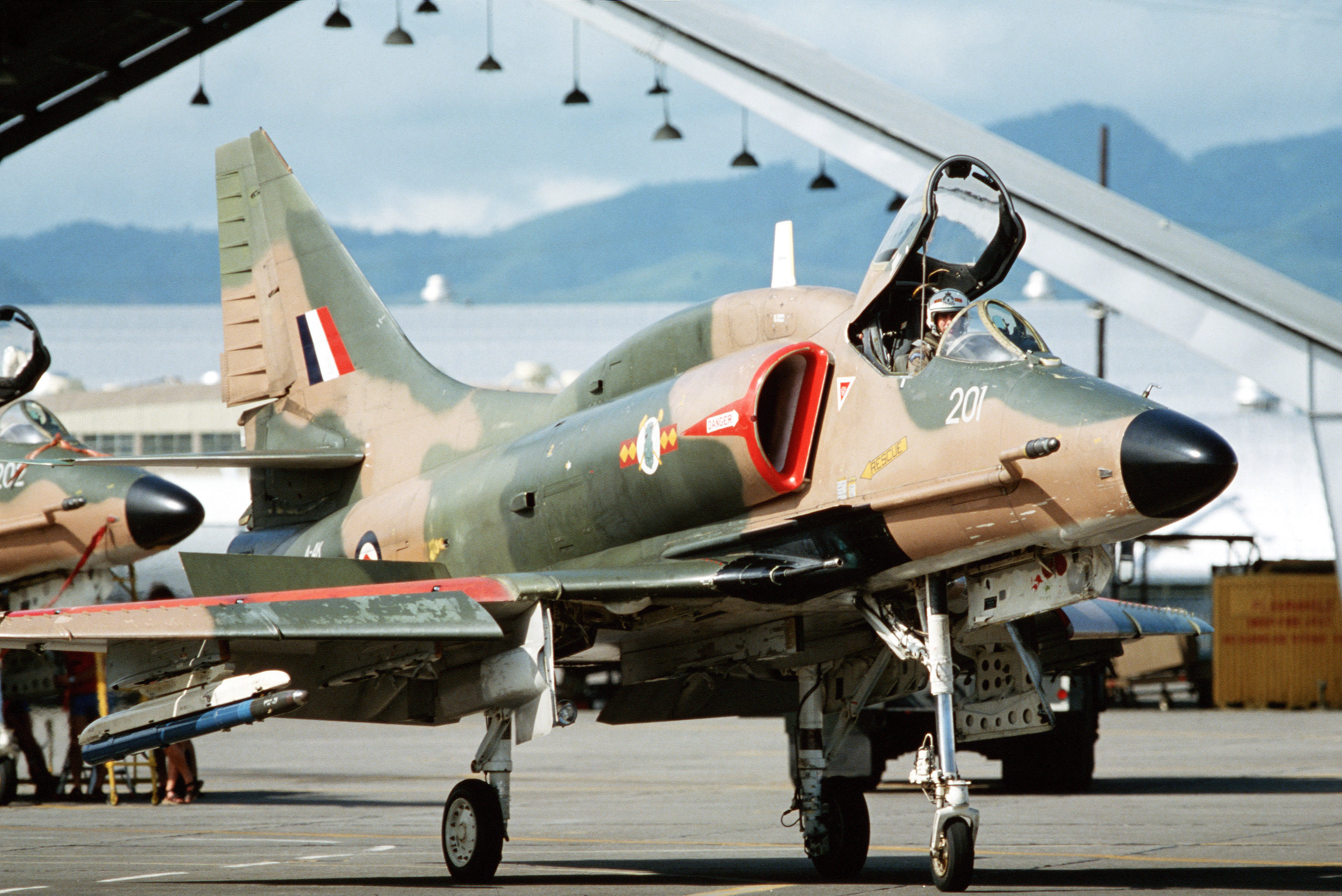
A RNZAF A-4K in 1982

=== Disbandment ===
The RNZAF Air Combat Force, comprising Nos 2, 14, and 75 Squadrons, was officially disbanded on 13 December 2001. The disbandment day parade marched the three squadron standards to the Base Ohakea chapel of St Mark and were laid up there to hang from the rafters, until such time as the squadron(s) are reinstated.

A political group of concerned civilians and ex-serviceman, called "Save Our Squadrons" was formed to protest the move, and took High Court action in an attempt to prevent its loss. The court action was not successful. The New Zealand National Party at the time had promised to re-establish an air combat force if it was re-elected, however in later years statements from their defence spokesperson suggested the cost to do so might be prohibitive. In November 2008, the Labour Government was defeated by the National Party led by John Key. Reinstatement of the air combat capability is very unlikely, although it has been discussed in the media from time to time.

In 2011 eight former RNZAF A-4K and TA-4K Skyhawks were sold to Draken International. The Skyhawks are preserved in their RNZAF colour schemes and are used as adversary training aircraft against USAF and US Navy fighter aircraft. Draken International also bought eight former RNZAF Aermacchi MB-339 training jets.

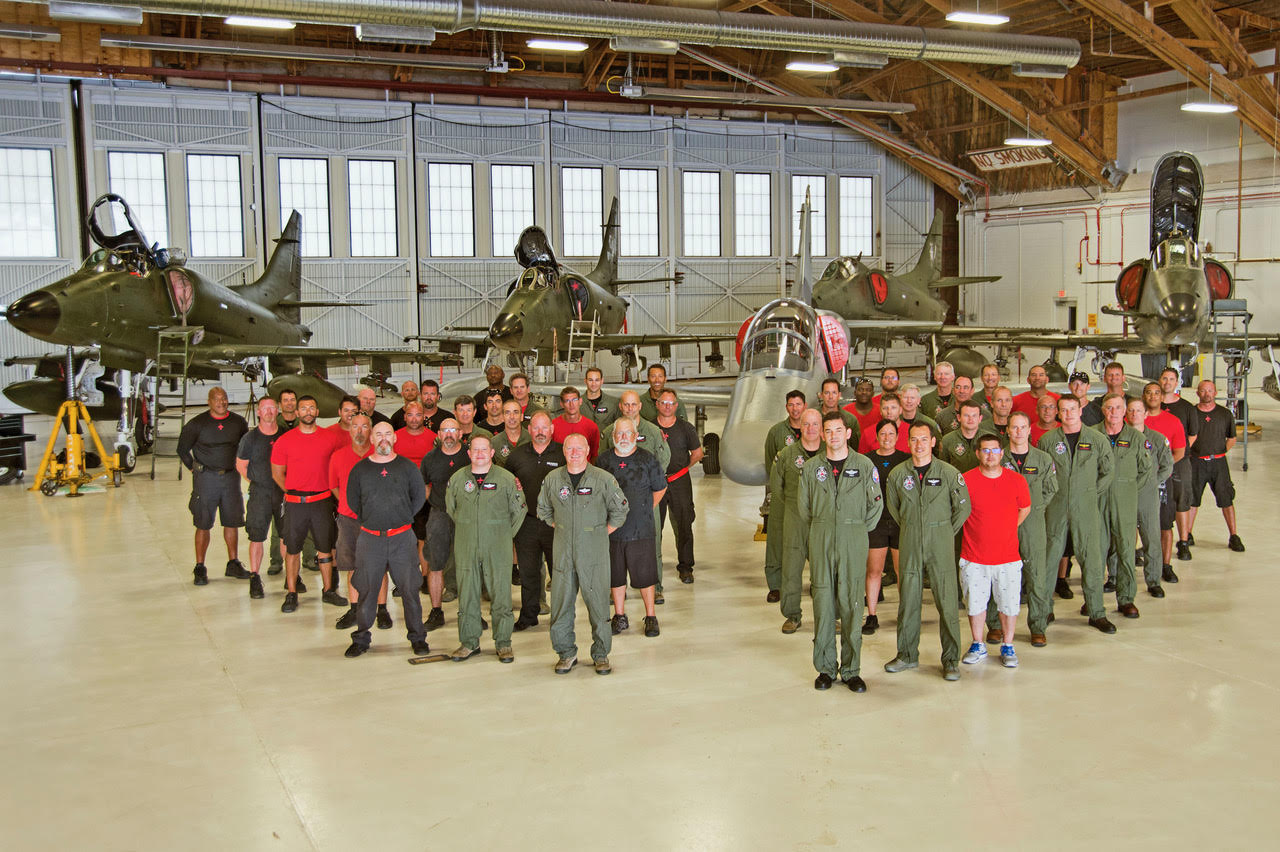
Draken International team with former RNZAF A-4K Skyhawks

== Media ==
A Squadron History by Norman Franks was published in 1991, titled Forever Strong (a translation of the squadron's Maori motto, Ake Ake Kia Kaha). A pictorial history of the final days of 2, 14 and 75 Squadron has been published, as has a children's book about a Skyhawk serving with the squadron. Aircraft of the Squadron featured in the film Sleeping Dogs and the Disney movie The Rescue.

The National Archives schools web-site features an interview with Gordon Ford, a British wireless operator who served with 75 Squadron.

== Preserved aircraft ==
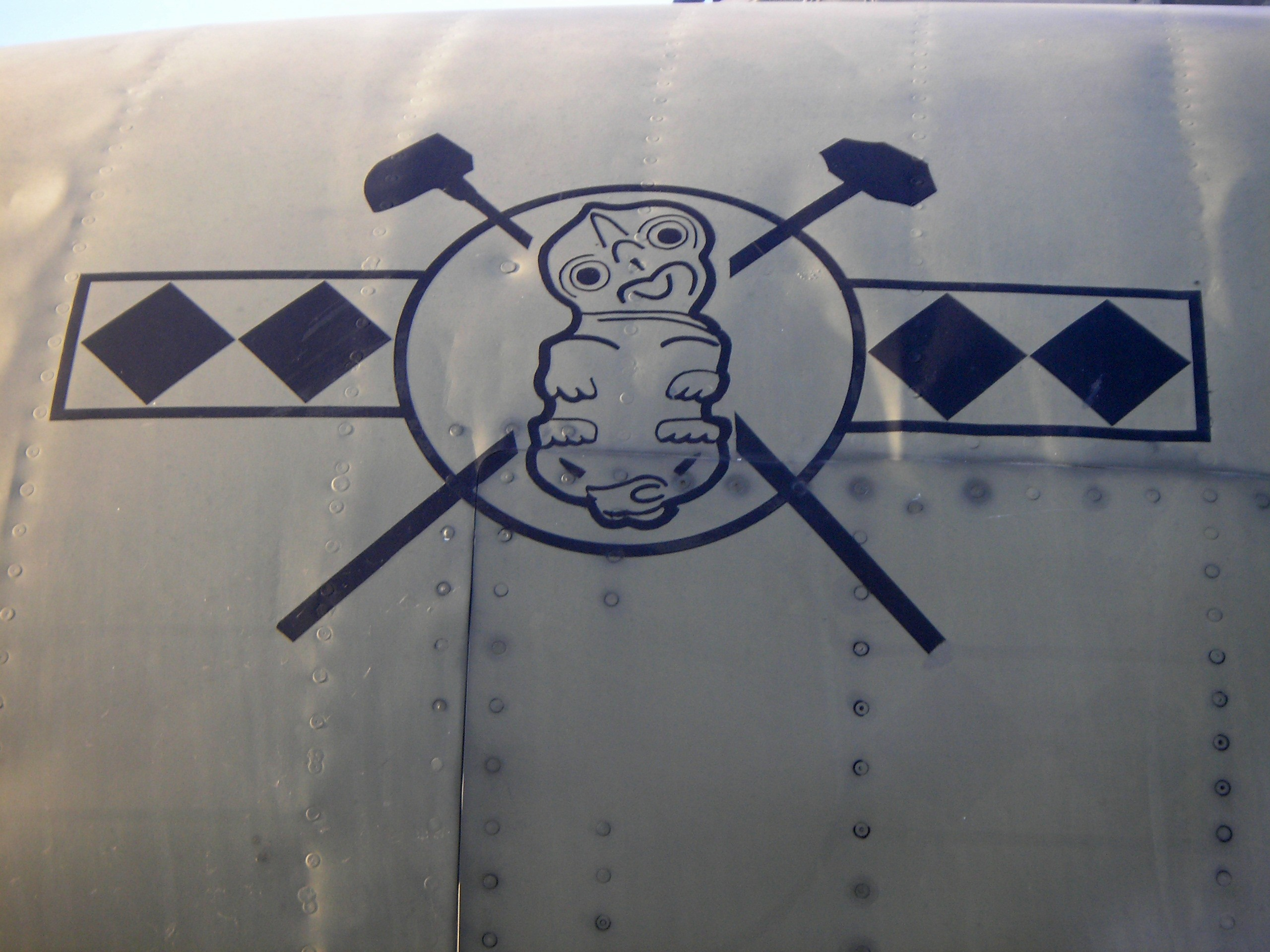
Badge of 75 Squadron on reconstructed TA-4K Kahu Skyhawk at the Ohakea wing of the RNZAF Museum in 2007

The biggest concentration of aircraft wearing 75 Squadron markings including some veterans is at the Museum of Transport and Technology in Auckland, New Zealand. Former WU13 L’Aeronavale (Maritime) Avro Lancaster NX665 1945 RAF Bomber Command Heavy Bomber that has been restored and is wearing 75 Squadron colours on one side with the nose art of 100+ mission veteran NE181 "The Captain's Fancy", which was scrapped and the colours of an RAF squadron with New Zealand aircrew on the other side. Adjacent is de Havilland Mosquito FB.40 NZ2305 from the Bankstown de Havilland Australia factory 1946. RAAF A52-19. Modified to T43 serial number A52-1053. To the RNZAF 75 Squadron as NZ2305 in 1947. Retired as farm shed prior to recovery. Nearby is De Havilland Vampire FB.9 c/n v1043 1950s jet fighter. 1952 RAF WR202. RNZAF Tengah 1955. Instructional airframe Hobsonville INST171 until 1962 now at MOTAT in Auckland, which never flew with the RNZAF in NZ but was used as a painting dolly, has 75 Squadron markings presumably painted by trainees at an RNZAF Station.

Preserved A-4K Skyhawks are at Classic Flyers Museum, Tauranga, Wheels and Wings Museum Wanaka, the Ashburton Aviation Museum, MoTaT, Warbirds at Ardmore, Omaka Aviation Heritage Centre, Fleet Air Arm Museum, Nowra, and the RNZAF Museum Wigram which has an A-4K, TA-4K and the replica, under.

Another Skyhawk in 75 Squadron markings is preserved (in the original RNZAF A-4 colour scheme, circa early 1970s) at the Royal New Zealand Air Force Museum at Wigram. Originally an early model US aircraft, this was gifted to NZ by an American movie company and assembled by the museum with straight refuelling probe and typical bomb and missile load for display. Hanging from the roof alongside is a De Havilland Vampire FB5 in 75 Squadron colours.

A TA-4K Skyhawk 'replica' assembled from parts in the late 1990s at Ohakea and carrying the fictitious tail number of NZ6257 also carries 75 Squadron low visibility markings on one side, with 2 Squadron markings on the other. This is the scheme applied to all Skyhawks in the late 1990s to 2001, to simplify the rotation of aircraft between 75 Squadron at Ohakea and 2 Squadron at NAS Nowra. This aircraft was positioned outside the Ohakea Museum, but when the Museum was closed in 2007 it was moved into No.2 Hangar. In 2018 the replica TA-4K Skyhawk was moved from storage and placed on permanent display in front of the Ohakea Officers Mess.

== 75 Squadron Association of New Zealand ==
The 75 Squadron Association of New Zealand, was created in 1955 to maintain the comradeship and associations that have been made through membership of 75 Squadron RAF, 75(NZ) Squadron RAF, and 75 Squadron RNZAF. It also was to maintain a link with between all former members of "75 Squadrons" and "75 Squadron Associations", both in NZ and overseas.

The 75 Squadron Association NZ is currently assembling the history of 75 Squadron from 1916 to 2001 for publication in two Volumes that includes stations, bases, countries, battles, honours, aircraft and listing all personnel.

== Bibliography ==
- Norman L. R Franks, Forever Strong: The Story of 75 Squadron RNZAF, 1916–1990, Random Century 1991. ISBN 978-1-86941-102-2
- Geoff Bentley and Maurice Conly, Portrait Of An Air Force, Grantham House Publishing 1987, ISBN 1-86934-010-8
