= List of Republic of Singapore Air Force squadrons =

This is a list of Republic of Singapore Air Force squadrons.

== Squadrons by alphabetical order ==
- 101 Squadron, Republic of Singapore Air Force
- 102 Squadron, Republic of Singapore Air Force
- 103 Squadron, Republic of Singapore Air Force
- 111 Squadron, Republic of Singapore Air Force
- 112 Squadron, Republic of Singapore Air Force
- 116 Squadron, Republic of Singapore Air Force
- 119 Squadron, Republic of Singapore Air Force
- 120 Squadron, Republic of Singapore Air Force
- 121 Squadron, Republic of Singapore Air Force
- 122 Squadron, Republic of Singapore Air Force
- 123 Squadron, Republic of Singapore Air Force
- 124 Squadron, Republic of Singapore Air Force
- 125 Squadron, Republic of Singapore Air Force
- 126 Squadron, Republic of Singapore Air Force
- 127 Squadron, Republic of Singapore Air Force
- 128 Squadron, Republic of Singapore Air Force
- 130 Squadron, Republic of Singapore Air Force
- 131 Squadron, Republic of Singapore Air Force
- 140 Squadron, Republic of Singapore Air Force
- 141 Squadron, Republic of Singapore Air Force
- 142 Squadron, Republic of Singapore Air Force
- 143 Squadron, Republic of Singapore Air Force
- 144 Squadron, Republic of Singapore Air Force
- 145 Squadron, Republic of Singapore Air Force
- 149 Squadron, Republic of Singapore Air Force
- 150 Squadron, Republic of Singapore Air Force
- 160 Squadron, Republic of Singapore Air Force
- 163 Squadron, Republic of Singapore Air Force
- 165 Squadron, Republic of Singapore Air Force
- 200 Squadron, Republic of Singapore Air Force
- 201 Squadron, Republic of Singapore Air Force
- 202 Squadron, Republic of Singapore Air Force
- 203 Squadron, Republic of Singapore Air Force
- 205 Squadron, Republic of Singapore Air Force
- 206 Squadron, Republic of Singapore Air Force
- 207 Squadron, Republic of Singapore Air Force
- 208 Squadron, Republic of Singapore Air Force
- 505 Squadron, Republic of Singapore Air Force
- 506 Squadron, Republic of Singapore Air Force
- 507 Squadron, Republic of Singapore Air Force
- 508 Squadron, Republic of Singapore Air Force
- 605 Squadron, Republic of Singapore Air Force
- 606 Squadron, Republic of Singapore Air Force
- 607 Squadron, Republic of Singapore Air Force
- 608 Squadron, Republic of Singapore Air Force
- 705 Squadron, Republic of Singapore Air Force
- 706 Squadron, Republic of Singapore Air Force
- 707 Squadron, Republic of Singapore Air Force
- 708 Squadron, Republic of Singapore Air Force
- 805 Squadron, Republic of Singapore Air Force
- 806 Squadron, Republic of Singapore Air Force
- 807 Squadron, Republic of Singapore Air Force
- 808 Squadron, Republic of Singapore Air Force
- 809 Squadron, Republic of Singapore Air Force
- 815 Squadron, Republic of Singapore Air Force
- 816 Squadron, Republic of Singapore Air Force
- 817 Squadron, Republic of Singapore Air Force
- 819 Squadron, Republic of Singapore Air Force
- RSAF Black Knights

== Squadrons by Air Base ==
=== Changi Air Base ===
- 112 Squadron, Republic of Singapore Air Force
- 121 Squadron, Republic of Singapore Air Force
- 145 Squadron, Republic of Singapore Air Force
- 208 Squadron, Republic of Singapore Air Force
- 508 Squadron, Republic of Singapore Air Force
- 608 Squadron, Republic of Singapore Air Force
- 708 Squadron, Republic of Singapore Air Force
- 808 Squadron, Republic of Singapore Air Force

=== Paya Lebar Air Base ===
- 122 Squadron, Republic of Singapore Air Force
- 142 Squadron, Republic of Singapore Air Force (disbanded in 2005 at TAB and reestablished in 2016 at PLAB)
- 149 Squadron, Republic of Singapore Air Force
- 207 Squadron, Republic of Singapore Air Force
- 507 Squadron, Republic of Singapore Air Force
- 607 Squadron, Republic of Singapore Air Force
- 707 Squadron, Republic of Singapore Air Force
- 807 Squadron, Republic of Singapore Air Force
- 817 Squadron, Republic of Singapore Air Force

=== Sembawang Air Base ===
- 1 Medical Squadron, Republic of Singapore Air Force
- 120 Squadron, Republic of Singapore Air Force
- 123 Squadron, Republic of Singapore Air Force
- 124 Squadron, Republic of Singapore Air Force
- 125 Squadron, Republic of Singapore Air Force
- 126 Squadron, Republic of Singapore Air Force
- 127 Squadron, Republic of Singapore Air Force
- 206 Squadron, Republic of Singapore Air Force
- 506 Squadron, Republic of Singapore Air Force
- 606 Squadron, Republic of Singapore Air Force
- 706 Squadron, Republic of Singapore Air Force
- 806 Squadron, Republic of Singapore Air Force
- 816 Squadron, Republic of Singapore Air Force

=== Tengah Air Base ===
- 111 Squadron, Republic of Singapore Air Force
- 116 Squadron, Republic of Singapore Air Force
- 119 Squadron, Republic of Singapore Air Force
- 140 Squadron, Republic of Singapore Air Force
- 143 Squadron, Republic of Singapore Air Force
- 205 Squadron, Republic of Singapore Air Force
- 505 Squadron, Republic of Singapore Air Force
- 605 Squadron, Republic of Singapore Air Force
- 705 Squadron, Republic of Singapore Air Force
- 805 Squadron, Republic of Singapore Air Force
- 815 Squadron, Republic of Singapore Air Force
- RSAF Black Knights

=== Overseas detachments ===
- 130 Squadron, Republic of Singapore Air Force
- 150 Squadron, Republic of Singapore Air Force
- Peace Carvin II detachment
- Peace Carvin V detachment
- Peace Vanguard detachment
- Oakey detachment

== Air Support/Air Defence ==
- 128 Squadron, Republic of Singapore Air Force
- 160 Squadron, Republic of Singapore Air Force
- 163 Squadron, Republic of Singapore Air Force
- 165 Squadron, Republic of Singapore Air Force
- 200 Squadron, Republic of Singapore Air Force
- 201 Squadron, Republic of Singapore Air Force
- 202 Squadron, Republic of Singapore Air Force
- 203 Squadron, Republic of Singapore Air Force
- 3rd Divisional Air Defence Artillery Battalion, Republic of Singapore Air Force
- 6th Divisional Air Defence Artillery Battalion, Republic of Singapore Air Force
- 9th Divisional Air Defence Artillery Battalion, Republic of Singapore Air Force
- 18th Divisional Air Defence Artillery Battalion, Republic of Singapore Air Force
