= Singapore Armed Forces Best Unit Competition =

Annual military tournament

The Singapore Armed Forces Best Unit Competition is an annual competition which confers awards of recognition to the most outstanding units of the Singapore Armed Forces (SAF) in combat readiness, operational proficiency and administrative excellence. Besides encouraging the above, the award also seeks to promote esprit-de-corps and camaraderie among participating Army, Air Force and Navy units through friendly competition.

The assessment factors of the competition are:

- Combat Proficiency Test
- Marksmanship Test
- Individual Physical Proficiency Test
- Standard Obstacle Course
- Unarmed Combat
- Security
- Manpower Matters
- Logistics Readiness Inspection
- Vehicle State
- Training Safety

The competition was started for active SAF units in 1969, before being extended to the reservist units (now known as NS units) in 1993. These units are conferred their awards at the annual Singapore Armed Forces Day parade.

The types of units that participate include:

- Singapore Infantry Regiment (SIR)
- Singapore Combat Engineers (SCE)
- Ordnance Supply Base (OSB), the Kranji base

== Past active unit winners ==
=== Active Army units ===
The 1st Commando Battalion has won the Best Combat Unit for an unprecedented 39 times since the award was launched in 1969, and for 22 consecutive years since 2004.

Year	Best Army Units							
Year	Combat	Combat Support	Infantry/Guards	Armour	Artillery	Engineers	Signals/C4I	Combat Service Support
1969	1 SIR	Not contested	Not contested	Not contested	Not contested	Not contested	Not contested	Not contested
1970	1 SIR	Not contested	Not contested	Not contested	Not contested	Not contested	Not contested	Not contested
1971	3 SIR	Not contested	Not contested	Not contested	Not contested	Not contested	Not contested	Not contested
1972	4 SIR	GEB	Not contested	Not contested	Not contested	Not contested	Not contested	Not contested
1973	2 SIR	1 SIB	Not contested	Not contested	Not contested	Not contested	Not contested	Not contested
1974	1 CDO BN	1 SIB	Not contested	Not contested	Not contested	Not contested	Not contested	Not contested
1975	1 CDO BN	30 SCE	Not contested	Not contested	Not contested	Not contested	Not contested	Not contested
1976	1 CDO BN	30 SCE	Not contested	Not contested	Not contested	Not contested	Not contested	Not contested
1977	1 CDO BN	36 SCE	1 SIR	41 SAR	24 SA	36 SCE	Not contested	Not contested
1978	41 SAR	1 SIG	4 SIR	41 SAR	24 SA	35 SCE	1 SIG BN	Not contested
1979	42 SAR	SAFPU	6 SIR	42 SAR	160 BN	38 SCE	2 SIG BN	Not contested
1980	7 SIR	SAFPU	7 SIR	41 SAR	160 BN	38 SCE	1 SIG BN	Not contested
1981	3 GDS	2 SIG	3 GDS	46 SAR	22 SA	38 SCE	2 SIG	Not contested
1982	42 SAR	SAFPU	3 GDS	42 SAR	23 SA	38 SCE	2 SIG	GSMB
1983	3 GDS	2 SIG	3 GDS	46 SAR	25 SA	35 SCE	2 SIG	OSB
1984	41 SAR	40 SAR	3 GDS	40 SAR	22 SA	35 SCE	1 SIG	OSB
1985	1 CDO BN	40 SAR	1 CDO BN	41 SAR	22 SA	35 SCE	1 SIG	OSB
1986	5 SIR	40 SAR	5 SIR	40 SAR	23 SA	36 SCE	1 SIG	1 TPT BN
1987	1 CDO BN	SAFPU	6 SIR	40 SAR	24 SA	36 SCE	-	OSB
1988	1 CDO BN	20 SA	5 SIR	40 SAR	20 SA	35 SCE	-	OSB
1989	1 CDO BN	20 SA	2 SIR	41 SAR	20 SA	36 SCE	-	OSB
1990	1 CDO BN	24 SA	5 SIR	41 SAR	24 SA	36 SCE	-	6 DSMB
1991	3 GDS	24 SA	3 GDS	46 SAR	24 SA	35 SCE	-	GSMB
1992	1 CDO BN	22 SA	1 GDS	42 SAR	22 SA	36 SCE	-	GSMB
1993	1 CDO BN	23 SA	5 SIR	42 SAR	23 SA	36 SCE	-	GSMB
1994	1 CDO BN	20 SA	5 SIR	40 SAR	20 SA	36 SCE	3 SIG	1 TPT BN
1995	1 CDO BN	22 SA	3 GDS	42 SAR	22 SA	36 SCE	1 SIG	1 TPT BN
1996	1 CDO BN	36 SCE	1 GDS	42 SAR	23 SA	36 SCE	1 SIG	1 TPT BN
1997	3 SIR	36 SCE	3 SIR	40 SAR	21 SA	36 SCE	2 SIG	9 DSMB
1998	1 SIR	36 SCE	1 SIR	40 SAR	21 SA	36 SCE	1 SIG	9 DSMB
1999	1 CDO BN	21 SA	1 SIR	40 SAR	21 SA	36 SCE	2 SIG	1 TPT BN
2000	1 CDO BN	20 SA	3 GDS	40 SAR	20 SA	36 SCE	2 SIG	3 DSMB
2001	1 CDO BN	2 SIG	3 GDS	40 SAR	24 SA	35 SCE	2 SIG	9 DSMB
2002	40 SAR	20 SA	1 SIR	40 SAR	20 SA	35 SCE	2 SIG	3 TPT BN
2003	1 GDS	3 SIG	1 GDS	46 SAR	24 SA	35 SCE	3 SIG	GSMB
2004	1 CDO BN	3 TPT	3 SIR	46 SAR	24 SA	35 SCE	3 SIG	3 TPT
2005	1 CDO BN	23 SA	1 SIR	41 SAR	23 SA	35 SCE	3 SIG	3 TPT
2006	1 CDO BN	3 SIG	5 SIR	46 SAR	23 SA	36 SCE	3 SIG	GSMB
2007	1 CDO BN	3 SIG	2 SIR	40 SAR	24 SA	36 SCE	3 SIG	1 AMB
2008	1 CDO BN	24 SA	3 GDS	40 SAR	24 SA	30 SCE	2 SIG	3 TPT BN
2009	1 CDO BN	39 SCE	3 SIR	42 SAR	23 SA	39 SCE	3 SIG	3 TPT BN
2010	1 CDO BN	39 SCE	3 GDS	42 SAR	21 SA	39 SCE	1 SIG	3 TPT BN
2011	1 CDO BN	24 SA	3 SIR	48 SAR	24 SA	39 SCE	1 SIG	3 TPT BN
2012	1 CDO BN	11 C4I	3 SIR	48 SAR	24 SA	35 SCE	11 C4I	6 AMB
2013	1 CDO BN	1 SIG	4 SIR	40 SAR	24 SA	35 SCE	1 SIG	6 AMB
2014	1 CDO BN	1 SIG	4 SIR	40 SAR	24 SA	38 SCE	1 SIG	6 AMB
2015	1 CDO BN	38 SCE	1 GDS	48 SAR	24 SA	38 SCE	1 SIG	6 AMB
2016	1 CDO BN	38 SCE	3 GDS	40 SAR	24 SA	38 SCE	1 SIG	GSAB
2017	1 CDO BN	38 SCE	1 GDS	48 SAR	24 SA	38 SCE	1 SIG	6 AMB
2018	1 CDO BN	38 SCE	3 GDS	48 SAR	24 SA	38 SCE	11 C4I	6 AMB
2019	1 CDO BN	38 SCE	3 SIR	41 SAR	24 SA	38 SCE	17 C4I	6 AMB
2020	1 CDO BN	38 SCE	1 GDS	40 SAR	24 SA	38 SCE	11 C4I	6 AMB
2021	1 CDO BN	35 SCE	3 SIR	41 SAR	24 SA	35 SCE	16 C4I	6 AMB
2022	1 CDO BN	39 SCE	1 SIR	41 SAR	21 SA	39 SCE	10 C4I	6 AMB
2023	1 CDO BN	38 SCE	1 GDS	41 SAR	23 SA	38 SCE	16 C4I	6 AMB
2024	1 CDO BN	30 SCE	2 SIR	42 SAR	24 SA	30 SCE	10 C4I	6 AMB
2025	1 CDO BN	17 C4I	1 GDS	40 SAR	24 SA	35 SCE	17 C4I	3 AMB
2026	1 CDO BN	35 SCE	3 GDS	40 SAR	24 SA	35 SCE	10 C4I	6 AMB
Year	Combat	Combat Support	Infantry/Guards	Armour	Artillery	Engineers	Signals/C4I	Combat Service Support

==== Retired award ====
Year	Best Army Units
Year	Minor (1974–1976)
1974	OMB
1975	SAFPU
1976	36 SCE

=== Active Navy units ===
Two new awards in maritime security and in naval engineering and logistics were introduced in 2015.

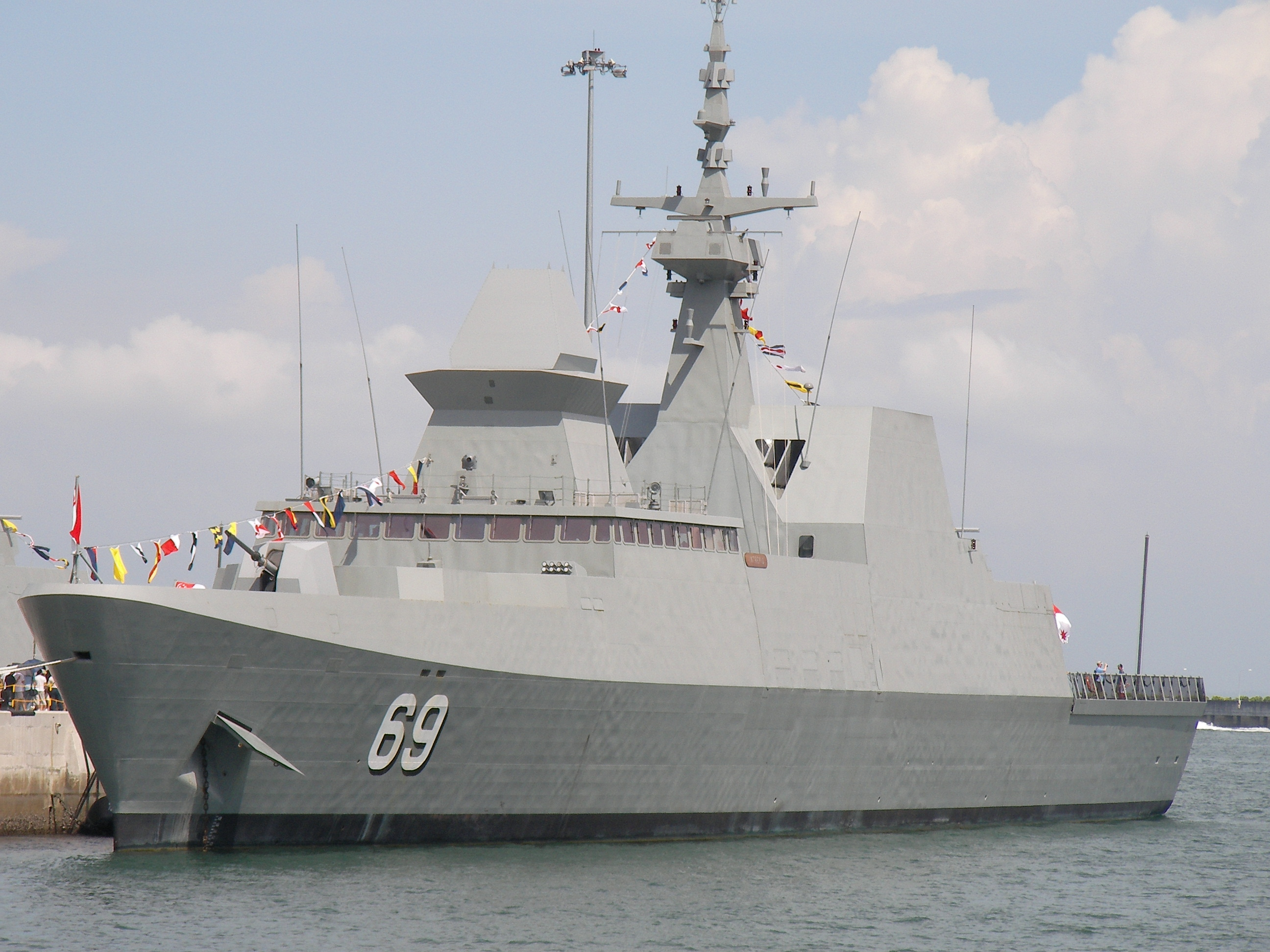
RSS Intrepid (Formidable-class frigate), winner of Best Ship Award in 2013

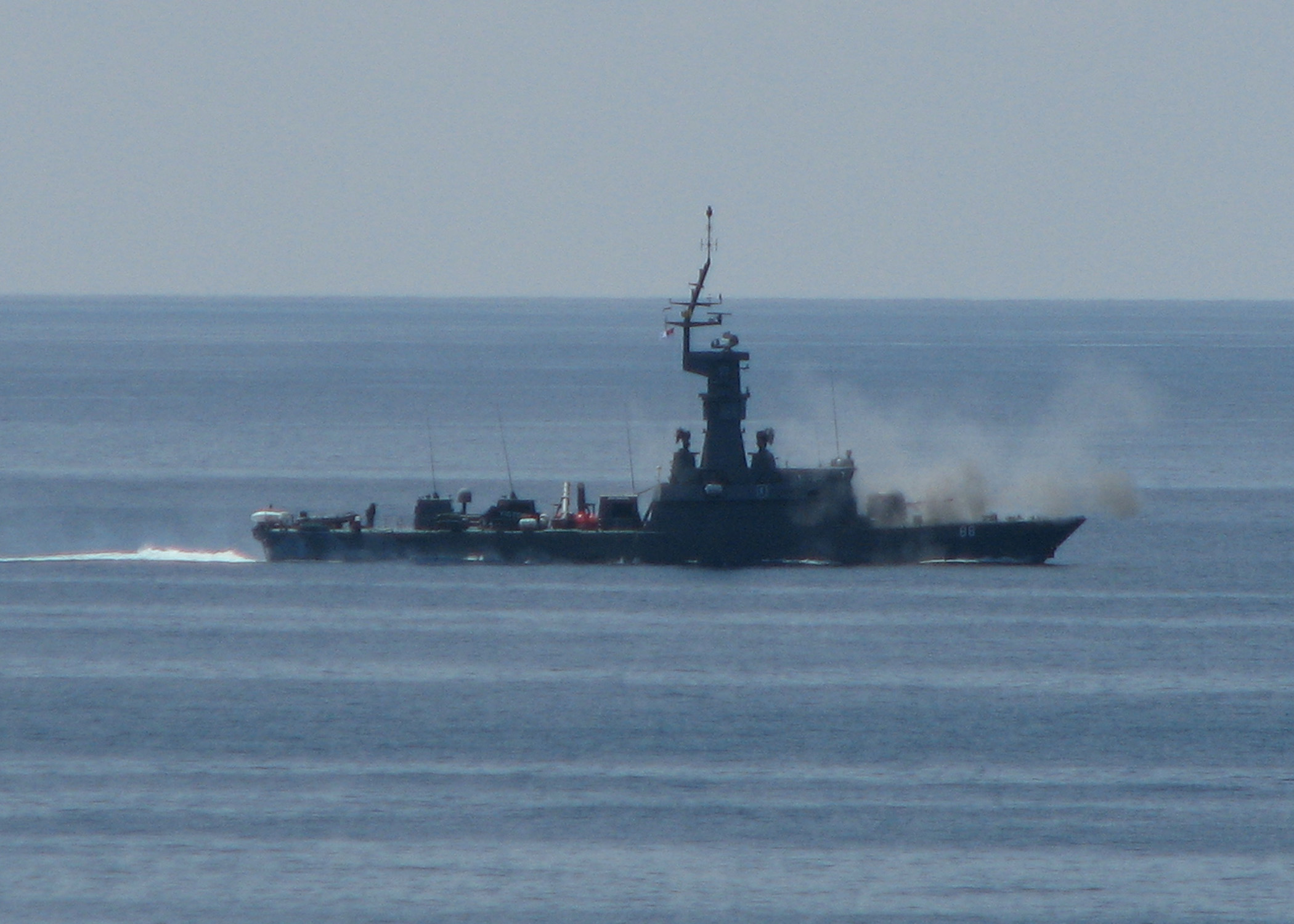
RSS Victory

Year	Best Navy Units		
Year	Fleet	Maritime Security	Naval Engineering & Logistics
1981	RSS Independence (Fast patrol craft)	Not contested	Not contested
1982	RSS Sea Scorpion (Sea Wolf-class gunboat)	Not contested	Not contested
1983	RSS Justice (Fast patrol craft)	Not contested	Not contested
1984	RSS Dauntless (Fast patrol craft)	Not contested	Not contested
1985	RSS Persistence (County-class LST)	Not contested	Not contested
1986	RSS Swift Archer (Coastal patrol craft)	Not contested	Not contested
1987	RSS Sea Scorpion (Sea Wolf-class gunboat)	Not contested	Not contested
1988	RSS Sea Hawk (Sea Wolf-class gunboat)	Not contested	Not contested
1989	RSS Sea Wolf (Sea Wolf-class gunboat)	Not contested	Not contested
1990	RSS Sea Dragon (Sea Wolf-class gunboat)	Not contested	Not contested
1991	RSS Sea Scorpion (Sea Wolf-class gunboat)	Not contested	Not contested
1992	RSS Vigilance (Victory-class corvette)	Not contested	Not contested
1993	RSS Valiant (Victory-class corvette)	Not contested	Not contested
1994	RSS Sea Hawk (Sea Wolf-class gunboat)	Not contested	Not contested
1995	RSS Victory (Victory-class corvette)	Not contested	Not contested
1996	RSS Victory (Victory-class corvette)	Not contested	Not contested
1997	RSS Sea Dragon (Sea Wolf-class gunboat)	Not contested	Not contested
1998	RSS Sea Lion (Sea Wolf-class gunboat)	Not contested	Not contested
1999	RSS Victory (Victory-class corvette)	Not contested	Not contested
2000	RSS Victory (Victory-class corvette)	Not contested	Not contested
2001	RSS Vigour (Victory-class corvette)	Not contested	Not contested
2002	RSS Vigour (Victory-class corvette)	Not contested	Not contested
2003	RSS Vigilance (Victory-class corvette)	Not contested	Not contested
2004	RSS Vengeance (Victory-class corvette)	Not contested	Not contested
2005	RSS Resolution (Endurance-class Landing Ship Tank)	Not contested	Not contested
2006	RSS Vengeance (Victory-class corvette)	Not contested	Not contested
2007	RSS Vengeance (Victory-class corvette)	Not contested	Not contested
2008	RSS Formidable (Formidable-class frigate)	Not contested	Not contested
2009	RSS Victory (Victory-class corvette)	Not contested	Not contested
2010	RSS Stalwart (Formidable-class frigate)	Not contested	Not contested
2011	RSS Chieftain (Challenger-class submarine)	Not contested	Not contested
2012	RSS Valiant (Victory-class corvette)	Not contested	Not contested
2013	RSS Intrepid (Formidable-class frigate)	Not contested	Not contested
2014	RSS Formidable (Formidable-class frigate)	Not contested	Not contested
2015	RSS Tenacious	RSS Resilience	Systems Readiness Engineering Centre (Weapons)
2016	RSS Vigour	RSS Bedok	Systems Readiness Engineering Centre (Networks and Sensors)
2017	RSS Steadfast	RSS Resilience	Ship Superintending Engineering Centre
2018	RSS Stalwart	RSS Daring	Systems Readiness Engineering Centre (Weapons)
2019	RSS Formidable	RSS Independence	Systems Readiness Engineering Centre (Weapons)
2020	RSS Vigour	RSS Independence	Ship Superintendent Engineering Centre
2021	RSS Conqueror	RSS Fortitude	Systems Readiness Engineering Centre (Weapons)
2022	RSS Tenacious	RSS Fearless	Systems Readiness Engineering Centre (Weapons)
2023	RSS Valiant	RSS Dauntless	Systems Readiness Engineering Centre (Weapons)
2024	RSS Tenacious	RSS Indomitable	Systems Readiness Engineering Centre (Weapons)
2025	RSS Supreme	RSS Indomitable	Base Facilities and Services Centre
2026	RSS Formidable	RSS Punggol	Ship Superintending Engineering Centre
Year	Fleet	Maritime Security	Naval Engineering & Logistics

=== Active Air Force units ===
The Best Helicopter Squadron award was introduced in 2010 to recognise the contributions of the RSAF helicopter squadrons. In 2014, two new awards in Control and Air Engineering were introduced. A new award in air logistics was introduced in 2015. 140 SQN currently holds the record for clinching the Best fighter Squadron 12 times.

Year	Best Air Force Units						
Year	Fighter Squadron	Helicopter Squadron	Ground Based Air Defence	Air Combat Support	Control Squadron	Air Engineering	Air Base Operability
1985	145 SQN (A-4S Skyhawk)	Not contested	165 SADA	Not contested	Not contested	Not contested	Not contested
1986	140 SQN (Hawker Hunter)	Not contested	165 SADA	Not contested	Not contested	Not contested	Not contested
1987	149 SQN (F-5E/F Tiger II)	Not contested	165 SADA	Not contested	Not contested	Not contested	Not contested
1988	149 SQN (F-5E/F Tiger II)	Not contested	160 SADA	Not contested	Not contested	Not contested	Not contested
1989	143 SQN (A-4SU Super Skyhawk)	Not contested	160 SADA	120 SQN (UH-1H)	Not contested	Not contested	Not contested
1990	143 SQN (A-4SU Super Skyhawk)	Not contested	165 SADA	122 SQN (C-130 Hercules)	Not contested	Not contested	Not contested
1991	140 SQN (F-16A/B Fighting Falcon)	Not contested	160 SADA	111 SQN (E-2C Hawkeye)	Not contested	Not contested	Not contested
1992	140 SQN (F-16A/B Fighting Falcon)	Not contested	165 SADA	120 SQN (UH-1H)	Not contested	Not contested	Not contested
1993	140 SQN (F-16A/B Fighting Falcon)	Not contested	160 SADA	125 SQN (Super Puma)	Not contested	Not contested	Not contested
1994	140 SQN (F-16A/B Fighting Falcon)	Not contested	160 SADA	126 SQN (Cougar)	Not contested	Not contested	Not contested
1995	144 SQN (F-5S/T Tiger II)	Not contested	160 SQN	120 SQN (UH-1H)	Not contested	Not contested	Not contested
1996	140 SQN (F-16A/B Fighting Falcon)	Not contested	3 DA BN	120 SQN (UH-1H)	Not contested	Not contested	Not contested
1997	145 SQN (A-4SU Super Skyhawk)	Not contested	165 SQN	121 SQN (Fokker F-50 MPA/UTL)	Not contested	Not contested	Not contested
1998	145 SQN (A-4SU Super Skyhawk)	Not contested	165 SQN	122 SQN (C-130 Hercules)	Not contested	Not contested	Not contested
1999	140 SQN (F-16A/B Fighting Falcon)	Not contested	160 SQN	125 SQN (Super Puma)	Not contested	Not contested	Not contested
2000	145 SQN (A-4SU Super Skyhawk)	Not contested	163 SQN	120 SQN (UH-1H)	Not contested	Not contested	Not contested
2001	142 SQN (A-4SU Super Skyhawk)	Not contested	163 SQN	111 SQN (E-2C Hawkeye)	Not contested	Not contested	Not contested
2002	149 SQN (F-5S/T Tiger II)	Not contested	3 DA BN	121 SQN (Fokker F-50 MPA/UTL)	Not contested	Not contested	Not contested
2003	140 SQN (F-16C/D Fighting Falcon)	Not contested	18 DA BN	121 SQN (Fokker F-50 MPA/UTL)	Not contested	Not contested	Not contested
2004	149 SQN (F-5S/T Tiger II)	Not contested	160 SQN	120 SQN (UH-1H)	Not contested	Not contested	Not contested
2005	144 SQN (F-5S/T Tiger II)	Not contested	160 SQN	122 SQN (C-130 Hercules)	Not contested	Not contested	Not contested
2006	140 SQN (F-16C/D Fighting Falcon)	Not contested	160 SQN	112 SQN (KC-135 Stratotanker)	Not contested	Not contested	Not contested
2007	140 SQN (F-16C/D Fighting Falcon)	Not contested	3 DA BN	127 SQN (CH-47SD Chinook)	Not contested	Not contested	Not contested
2008	149 SQN (F-5S/T Tiger II)	Not contested	3 DA BN	121 SQN (Fokker F-50 MPA/UTL)	Not contested	Not contested	Not contested
2009	144 SQN (F-5S/T Tiger II)	Not contested	3 DA BN	112 SQN (KC-135 Stratotanker)	Not contested	Not contested	Not contested
2010	140 SQN (F-16C/D Fighting Falcon)	127 SQN (CH-47SD Chinook)	3 DA BN	121 SQN (Fokker F-50 MPA/UTL)	Not contested	Not contested	Not contested
2011	149 SQN	120 SQN	165 SQN	121 SQN (Fokker F-50 MPA/UTL)	Not contested	Not contested	Not contested
2012	145 SQN (A-4SU Super Skyhawk)	126 SQN	163 SQN	111 SQN	Not contested	Not contested	Not contested
2013	149 SQN (F-15SG Strike Eagle)	126 SQN	163 SQN	116 SQN	Not contested	Not contested	Not contested
2014	145 SQN (A-4SU Super Skyhawk)	125 SQN	163 SQN	122 SQN	203 SQN	807 SQN	Not contested
2015	144 SQN (F-5S/T Tiger II)	126 SQN	163 SQN	112 SQN	206 SQN	807 SQN	Air Force Supply Centre
2016	140 SQN	127 SQN	6 DA BN	121 SQN	208 SQN	807 SQN	707 SQN
2017	143 SQN	125 SQN	165 SQN	121 SQN	205 SQN	811 SQN	Air Force Supply Centre
2018	149 SQN	125 SQN	165 SQN	112 SQN	207 SQN	817 SQN	706 SQN
2019	142 SQN	125 SQN	3 DA BN	119 SQN	206 SQN	811 SQN	707 SQN
2020	143 SQN	125 SQN	163 SQN	122 SQN	206 SQN	816 SQN	706 SQN
2021	143 SQN	120 SQN	3 DA BN	112 SQN	206 SQN	816 SQN	706 SQN
2022	143 SQN	120 SQN	6 DA BN	119 SQN	206 SQN	811 SQN	608 SQN
2023	143 SQN	120 SQN	3 DA BN	111 SQN	201 SQN	816 SQN	707 SQN
2024	142 SQN	120 SQN	163 SQN	111 SQN	205 SQN	817 SQN	707 SQN
2025	142 SQN	120 SQN	165 SQN	122 SQN	206 SQN	811 SQN	505 SQN
2026	145 SQN	126 SQN	163 SQN	122 SQN	206 SQN	811 SQN	505 SQN
Year	Fighter Squadron	Helicopter Squadron	Ground Based Air Defence	Air Combat Support	Control Squadron	Air Engineering	Air Base Operability

== Past National Service unit winners ==
=== Army NS units ===
Year	Best Army NS Units						
Year	Infantry / Guards	Armour	Artillery	Combat engineers	Signals/C4I	Combat Service Support	Combat Support
1994	67 GDS / 88 GDS / 187 SIR	422 SAR	211 SA	307 SCE	6 SIG BN	9 DS MED BN	Not contested
1995	514 SIR / 543 SIR / 70 GDS / 91 GDS	432 SAR	204 SA	307 SCE	8 SIG BN	9 DS MED BN	Not contested
1996	184 SIR / 188 SIR / 504 SIR / 514 SIR / 543 SIR / 70 GDS	423 SAR	265 SA	307 SCE	6 SIG BN	6 DS MED BN	Not contested
1997	83 SIR / 188 SIR / 525 SIR / 541 SIR / 70 GDS / 550 GDS	423 SAR	204 SA	321 SCE	6 SIG BN	6 DS MED BN	Not contested
1998	184 SIR / 514 SIR / 525 SIR / 542 SIR / 531 GDS / 549 GDS	416 SAR	204 SA	308 SCE	6 SIG BN	6 DS MED BN	Not contested
1999	185 SIR / 187 SIR / 523 SIR / 573 SIR / 531 GDS / 548 GDS	425 SAR	211 SA	322 SCE	6 SIG BN	6 DS MED BN	Not contested
2000	85 SIR / 187 SIR / 524 SIR / 573 SIR / 595 SIR / 548 GDS	466 SAR	211 SA	323 SCE	6 SIG BN	6 DS MED BN	Not contested
2001	516 SIR / 542 SIR / 557 SIR / 602 SIR / 86 GDS / 90 GDS	466 SAR	274 SA	326 SCE	6 SIG BN	6 DS MED BN	Not contested
2002	652 SIR / 621 SIR / 596 SIR / 550 GDS / 86 GDS / 524 SIR	466 SAR	254 SA	324 SCE	6 SIG BN	6 DS MED BN	Not contested
2003	652 SIR / 652 SIR / 595 SIR / 550 GDS / 90 GDS / 548 GDS	466 SAR	271 SA	327 SCE	9 SIG BN	6 DS MED BN	Not contested
2004	652 SIR / 657 SIR / 596 SIR / 543 SIR / 566 SIR / 583 GDS	424 SAR	278 SA	328 SCE	6 SIG BN	6 DS MED BN	Not contested
2005	588 SIR / 596 SIR / 657 SIR / 682 SIR / 550 GDS	466 SAR	275 SA	324 SCE	6 SIG BN	9 DS MED BN	Not contested
2006	626 SIR / 657 SIR / 596 SIR / 581 SIR / 609 SIR	442 SAR	278 SA	324 SCE	6 SIG BN	6 DS MED BN	Not contested
2007	652 SIR / 622 SIR / 596 SIR / 609 SIR / 566 SIR	466 SAR	256 SA	328 SCE	6 SIG BN	31 FCCS BN	Not contested
2008	652 SIR / 622 SIR / 596 SIR / 634 GDS / 663 SIR	442 SAR	280 SA	327 SCE	6 SIG BN	31 FCCS BN	Not contested
2009	652 SIR / 622 SIR / 696 SIR / 685 GDS / 628 SIR	442 SAR	282 SA	329 SCE	6 SIG BN	31 FCCS BN	Not contested
2010	588 SIR / 700 SIR / 720 SIR / 685 GDS / 663 SIR	442 SAR	280 SA	329 SCE	9 SIG BN	31 FCCS BN	Not contested
2011	688 SIR / 700 SIR / 720 SIR / 724 GDS / 693 SIR	453 SAR	282 SA	329 SCE	9 SIG BN	31 FCCS BN	Not contested
2012	778 SIR / 700 SIR / 803 SIR / 745 GDS / 747 GDS	452 SAR	282 SA	329 SCE	6 SIG BN	31 FCCS BN	Not contested
2013	688 SIR / 755 SIR / 720 SIR / 745 GDS / 747 GDS	430 SAR	287 SA	321 SCE	6 SIG BN	3 CSH	Not contested
2014	688 SIR / 755 SIR / 787 SIR / 734 GDS / 611 SIR	483 SAR	289 SA	324 SCE	6 SIG BN	32 CSS BN	Not contested
2015	688 SIR / 700 SIR / 787 SIR / 740 GDS / 611 SIR	485 SAR	289 SA	321 SCE	9 SIG BN	8 CSH	Not contested
2016	754 SIR / 772 SIR / 787 SIR / 735 GDS / 611 SIR	485 SAR	288 SA	324 SCE	9 SIG BN	3 CSH	Not contested
2017	733 SIR / 769 SIR / 788 SIR / 740 GDS / 812 SIR	474 SAR	289 SA	327 SCE	9 SIG BN	2 CSH	Not contested
2018	746 SIR / 772 SIR / 788 SIR / 740 GDS / 612 SIR	473 SAR	288 SA	324 SCE	9 SIG BN	63 CSS BN	Not contested
2019	746 SIR / 769 SIR / 790 SIR / 745 GDS / 792 SIR	474 SAR	267 SA	327 SCE	9 SIG BN	63 CSS BN	Not contested
2020	786 SIR / 797 SIR / 790 SIR / 737 GDS / 792 SIR	474 SAR	228 SA	351 SCE	9 SIG BN	63 CSS BN	Not contested
2021	746 SIR / 783 SIR / 793 SIR / 737 GDS / 716 SIR	484 SAR	295 SA	351 SCE	Not contested	38 CSS BN	351 SCE
2022	786 SIR / 783 SIR / 791 SIR / 758 GDS / 716 SIR	474 SAR	295 SA	351 SCE	9 SIG BN / 167 C4I	61 CSS BN	Not contested
2023	776 SIR / 783 SIR / 791 SIR / 758 GDS / 909 SIR	489 SAR	295 SA	351 SCE	6 SIG BN / 167 C4I	33 CSS BN	Not contested
2024	776 SIR / 794 SIR / 763 SIR / 757 GDS / 909 SIR	489 SAR	244 SA	391 SCE	9 SIG BN / 167 C4I	2 CSS BN	Not contested
2025	773 SIR / 794 SIR / 780 SIR / 756 GDS / 909 SIR	489 SAR	267 SA	391 SCE	9 SIG BN / 114 C4I	3 CSH	Not contested
Year	Infantry / Guards	Armour	Artillery	Combat engineers	Signals/C4I	Combat Service Support	Combat Support

==== Retired award ====
Year	Best Army NS Units
Year	People's Defence Force Command
1994	73 SIR / 184 SIR
1995	63 SIR / 504 SIR

=== Naval NS units ===
A new Best Naval NS Unit award was introduced from 2015.

Year	Best Naval NS Units
2015	RSS Vigilance (Victory-class missile corvette)
2016	RSS Vengeance Team 1
2017	RSS Vengeance Team 1
2018	RSS Vengeance Team 1
2019	RSS Vengeance
2020	RSS Vengeance
2021	RSS Vengeance
2022	RSS Vigilance
2023	RSS Vigilance
2024	3rd Flotilla - Support Group 1
2025	3rd Flotilla Support Group

== Controversies ==
In 2003, the 1st Commando Battalion was barred from the competition after it was found guilty of doctoring score-keeping records and fitness test results.

In 2009, three regulars from the 24th Battalion Singapore Artillery were convicted of falsifying their unit's test scores. Soldiers' results for the standard obstacle were doctored. As a result, the unit was disqualified that year and the trio were convicted and fined by the General Court Martial.
