= 144 Squadron =

144 Squadron may refer to:

- 144 Squadron (Israel)
- 144 Squadron, Republic of Singapore Air Force
- No. 144 Squadron RAF, United Kingdom
- 144th Aero Squadron, Air Service, United States Army; see list of American aero squadrons
- 144th Airlift Squadron, United States Air Force
- VAQ-144, United States Navy
- VMA-144, United States Marine Corps
