= 126 Squadron =

126 Squadron may refer to:

- 126 Squadron, Republic of Singapore Air Force
- No. 126 Squadron RAF, United Kingdom
- 126th Air Refueling Squadron, United States Air Force
- VAW-126, United States Navy
- VF-126, United States Navy
