= Oakey Army Aviation Centre =

Australian Army Aviation training establishment and airport in Oakey, Queensland

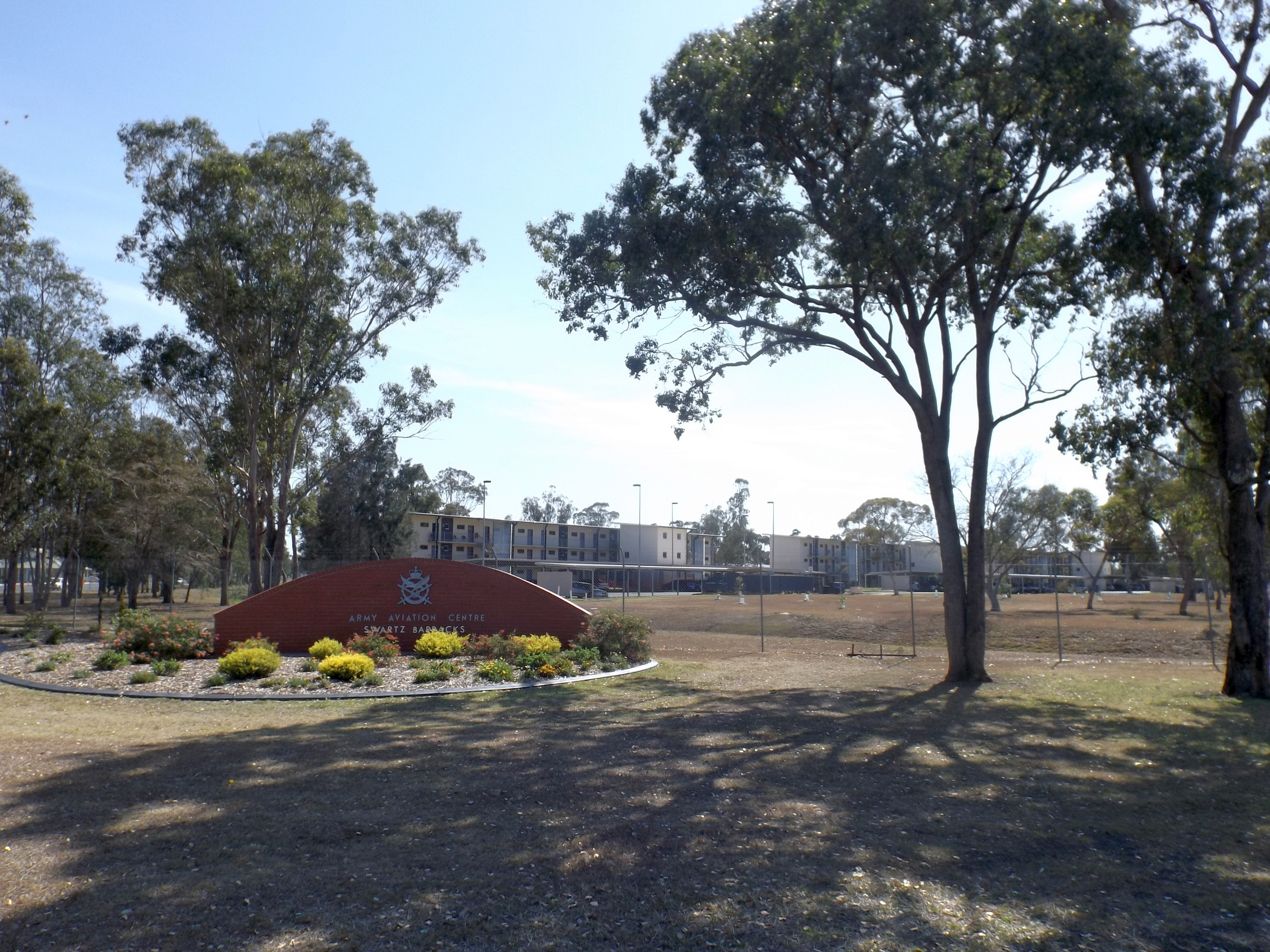
- Swartz Barracks, 2014
- IATA: OKY; ICAO: YBOK

Summary
- Airport type: Military
- Operator: Australian Army, Republic of Singapore Air Force Squadron 126
- Location: Oakey, Queensland
- Elevation AMSL: 1,335 ft (407 m)
- Coordinates: 27°24′41″S 151°44′07″E

Map
- Location in Queensland

Runways
Direction	Length		Surface
Direction	m	ft	Surface
05/23	914	2,999	Asphalt
09/27	1,089	3,573	Asphalt
14/32	1,649	5,410	Asphalt
- Sources: Australian AIP and aerodrome chart

Oakey Army Aviation Centre (IATA: OKY, ICAO: YBOK) is situated approximately 3 km (1.9 mi) from the town centre of Oakey in Queensland, Australia. It provides a training establishment for Australian Army Aviation, and also hosts the Republic of Singapore Air Force's 127 Squadron. The Defence name for the facility is Swartz Barracks, named for prominent politician, Army Aviation advocate, and ex-POW Sir Reginald Swartz.

== History ==
The base was constructed in 1943 by the Royal Australian Air Force as RAAF Base Oakey. It was a training facility, for No. 6 Aircraft Depot and an overflow aircraft maintenance depot for RAAF Base Amberley. It stored surplus aircraft after the war.

In July 1968, the Australian Army Aviation Corps was formed, with the Department of Civil Aviation aerodrome at Oakey transferred to Army control in July 1969 for the Corps base.

The 6 Aviation Squadron (Reconnaissance) relocated from RAAF Amberley. Army Aviation units were raised, including the Headquarters Army Aviation Centre to control the airfield, and the Army Aviation Centre Base Squadron. By the end of 1973, the remainder of 1st Aviation Regiment had relocated, including the School of Army Aviation formed from the Training Squadron, and the 5 Base Workshop Battalion of the Royal Australian Electrical and Mechanical Engineers (RAEME) to provide fleet maintenance.

173 General Support Squadron and 171 Command and Liaison Squadron were formed at Oakey. During the period up to the early 1990s, aircraft types operating from the base included Bell OH-58 Kiowa, Bell UH-1 Iroquois, Sikorsky S-70A-9 Black Hawk, Pilatus Porter, and GAF Nomad.

In 1998, the Army Aviation Training Centre (AAvnTC) was formed at Oakey to command the School of Army Aviation (SAA), the Australian Defence Force Helicopter School, later renamed the Army Helicopter School (AHS) and the RAEME Aircraft Maintenance School, later renamed the Rotary Wing Aircraft Maintenance School (RAMS).

In 2001, the Army Helicopter School was moved from RAAF Fairbairn to Oakey. In 2004, the Iroquois helicopters from the 1st Aviation Regiment at Oakey were moved to the 5th Aviation Regiment in Townsville.

During 2005–06, the 1st Aviation Regiment moved its Headquarters, technical and logistic support squadrons and other elements to Robertson Barracks in Darwin. In 2006, a disbandment parade was held at Oakey for the last independent RAEME Workshop.

In 2007, Boeing Australia was given the Army Aviation Training and Training Support (AATTS) contract, and commenced providing pilot, aircrew and technician training for the Kiowa and Black Hawk helicopters and operational fleet maintenance. In 2010, a new expanded contract was awarded to include most facets of the military rotary wing flying training for Kiowa, Black Hawk and Chinook helicopters.

In 2009, the 173rd Aviation Squadron ceased operations at Oakey, transferring the unit's Beechcraft King Air 350s to the RAAF. In 2010, with the realignment of the Army Chain of Command, the base units of the Army Aviation Training Centre came under the control and responsibility of the Army Forces Command. In 2021, the Army Aviation Training Centre transferred from Forces Command to the newly established Army Aviation Command.

In 2021, the Australian 5th Aviation Regiment and Singaporean 127 Squadron formed Multinational Task Group Chinook, with each providing 3 CH-47F Chinook (a total of 6) in support of the 2021–2022 eastern Australia floods. Aircraft flew daily sorties in support of flood affected areas such as Lismore, Murwillumbah and Ballina by transporting food, water, personnel and construction equipment.

In April 2024 110 fire ant nests were detected at the base. This infestation raised concerns as it was one of the first times that the insects had been detected in the Murray-Darling Basin system.

== Units ==
Australian Defence Force (ADF) units currently based at Oakey include:

- Army Aviation Training Centre (AAvnTC)
- School of Army Aviation (SAA)
- 5th Aviation Regiment - B Squadron
- No. 44 Wing Air Traffic Control Detachment
- 1MP Military Police (detachment, including dogs)
- Health Centre Oakey (Primary Health/Emergency Response/Crash Rescue/Aeromedical Evacuation)
- Rotary-wing Aircraft Maintenance School (RAMS)

Republic of Singapore Airforce (RSAF) units currently based at Oakey include:

- 127 Squadron (CH-47D and CH-47F)

== Aircraft ==
The base currently utilises the following aircraft types:

- Sikorsky UH-60M Black Hawk
- Airbus H135 T3H
- Boeing CH-47D/F (RSAF)
- Leonardo AW139 (Toll)

Visiting types include:

- Alenia C-27J Spartan (No. 35 Squadron RAAF)
- Agusta A109
- Boeing CH-47F Chinook
- Pacific Aerospace CT4B
- Lifeflight Bell 412

Warbirds:

- Various warbird types visit the airfield as part of the Army Aviation Museum Annual Fly-In.

== Facilities ==
The base facilities include accommodation for students attending courses and single members working on the base. Other facilities include tennis courts, squash courts, basketball and netball court, football ovals, heated 25 m (82 ft) indoor swimming pool, an equipped gymnasium, defence banking and credit union branches, and a AAFCANS kiosk (with ATM), as well as messing facilities for Soldiers, SNCO, and Officers.

== Australian Army Flying Museum ==
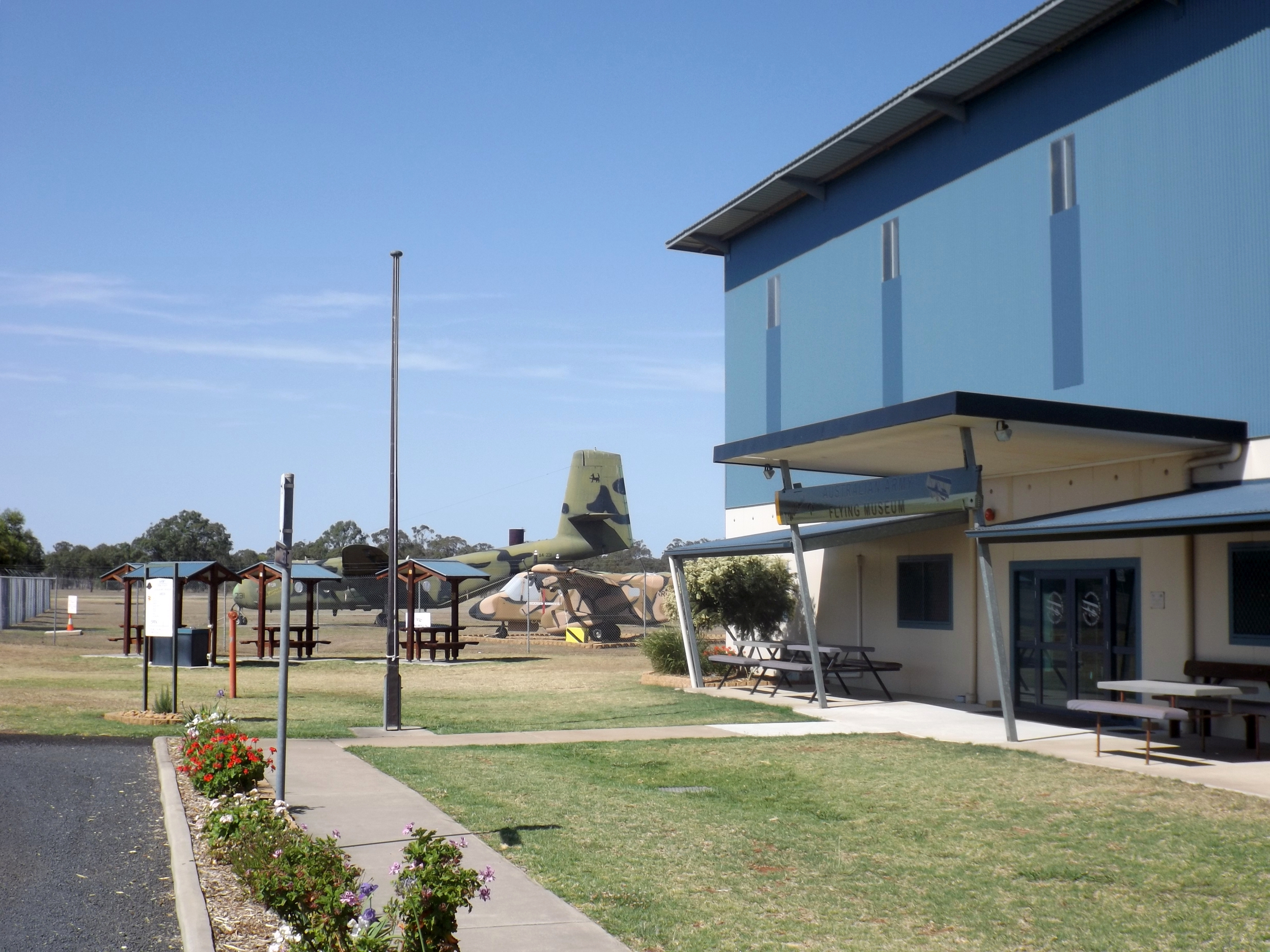
Museum entrance, 2014

The Australian Army Flying Museum reopened in September 2005 in new buildings on land adjacent to the airport, after a grant was provided by the Australian Government. Distinguished guests included national and local dignitaries, including well-known aviation identity Dick Smith. The purpose-built facility includes many historical aircraft tracing the history of the Aviation Corps in the Australian Army and back to the Australian Flying Corps during World War I.

Featured aircraft in the collection include Bell 47, Bell OH-58 Kiowa, GAF Nomad, Pilatus PC-6 Porter, and Cessna 180. The museum maintains a significant collection of artefacts dating from the inception of the Army Flying Corps and WWI to the present day.

The Australian Army Flying Museum is a sub-unit of the Army History Unit, a direct command unit of the Australian Army Headquarters.

== Airlines, facilities and destinations ==
=== Domestic ===
Whilst the airfield is military-controlled and regulated, a small civil terminal has been maintained on the airfield for many years. The current terminal structure was built at the same time as the new buildings for the Army Flying Museum refurbishment in 2005 and shares the access road to this facility.

The airfield does not cater for Regular Public Transport (RPT) airline services, however, it does provide an emergency alternative in the event of adverse weather.

=== Satellite sites ===
Associated with military training at OAAC are two satellite site airfields. Located 22 kilometres north-west is Brymaroo. Further west is Wyoming airfield. Both fields are for military use only.

== See also ==
- List of airports in Queensland
