= 140 Squadron, Republic of Singapore Air Force =

Republic of Singapore Air Force fighter unit

RSAF 140 Squadron
- Active: 1970-present
- Role: Multi-role fighter
- Garrison/HQ: Tengah Air Base
- Motto: "Stand Firm in Defence"
- Equipment: 12 F-16C/D Fighting Falcons

Commanders
- Notable commanders: Goh Yong Siang; Shawn Huang

Insignia
- Identification symbol: Osprey legs over the silhouette of Singapore

The 140 Squadron "Osprey" of the Republic of Singapore Air Force currently operates twelve F-16 Fighting Falcon of the F-16C/D Block 52 version. Based in Tengah Air Base, the squadron goes by the motto "Stand Firm in Defence" with the Osprey adopted as its mascot.

== History ==
The Squadron was set up in September 1970 as Singapore's first Air Defence Fighter Squadron and received their first aircraft - twenty refurbished Hawker Hunters aircraft in July 1970. The Hawker Hunters served faithfully for twenty years, after which they were replaced by the F-16A/Bs in 1990. These were, in turn, replaced by newer F-16C/Ds in 2000 and were subsequently transferred to Royal Thai Air Force the same year.

The Squadron celebrated its 50th anniversary in 2020.

== Information ==
The tail is adorned with a red checkered tailband. The squadron's logo is centered with the serial number on the base of the tail. This scheme was already applied during the F-16A/B era.

== Achievements ==
140 Squadron is also a consistent winner in the annual Singapore Armed Forces Best Unit Competition for the Air Force, having emerged as the Best Fighter Squadron since the competition's inception back in 1985. Namely: 1985, 1987, 1991, 1992, 1993, 1994, 1996, 1999, 2003, 2006, 2007, 2009, 2016.

140 Squadron won the Best Squadron for the Hotshot Challenge 2016. It celebrated its 45th anniversary in 2015 and won the Best Fighter Squadron.

== Aircraft operated ==
1. 46× Hawker Hunters (1970–1992)
2. 8× F-16A/B Fighting Falcons (1990–2004)
3. 12× F-16C/D Fighting Falcons (2003–present)

== Latest photo ==
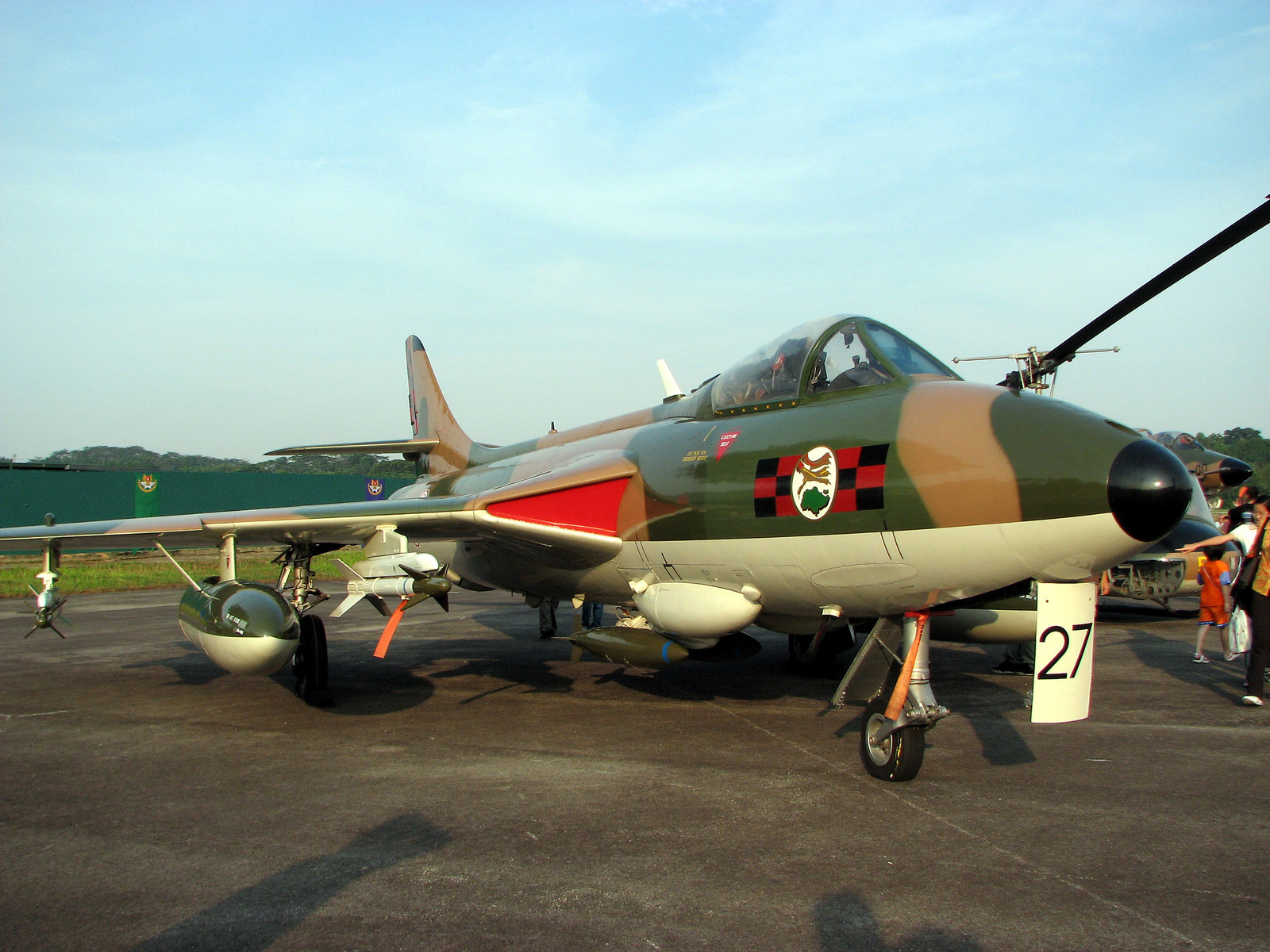
A retired 140 Sqn Hawker Hunter FGA.74S - serial number 527, parked outside the RSAF Museum.

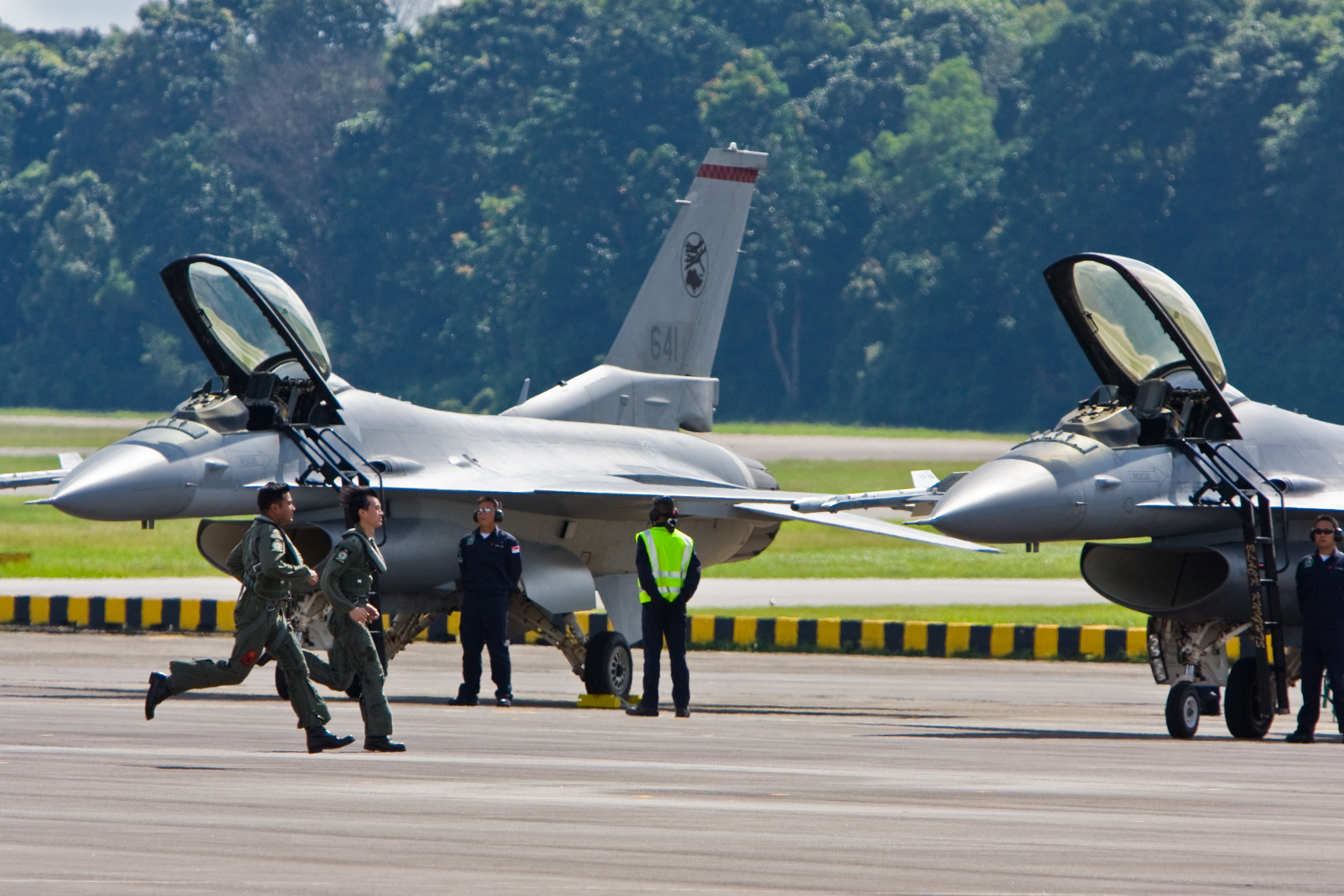
Pilots of 140 Sqn responding to a simulated quick reaction alert (QRA) to scramble their F-16Cs.

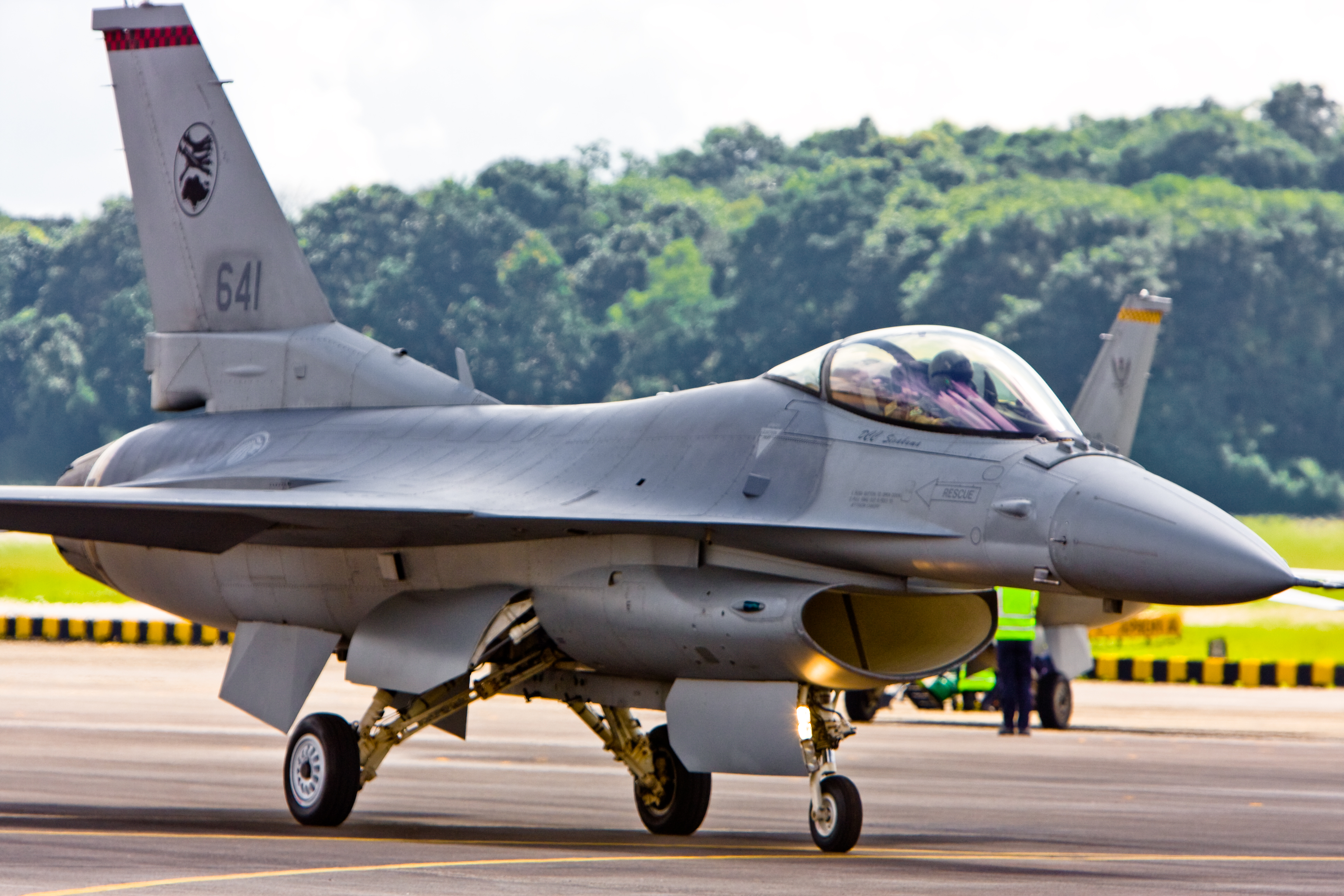
F-16C clearing out from the flight-line for taxi-ing.

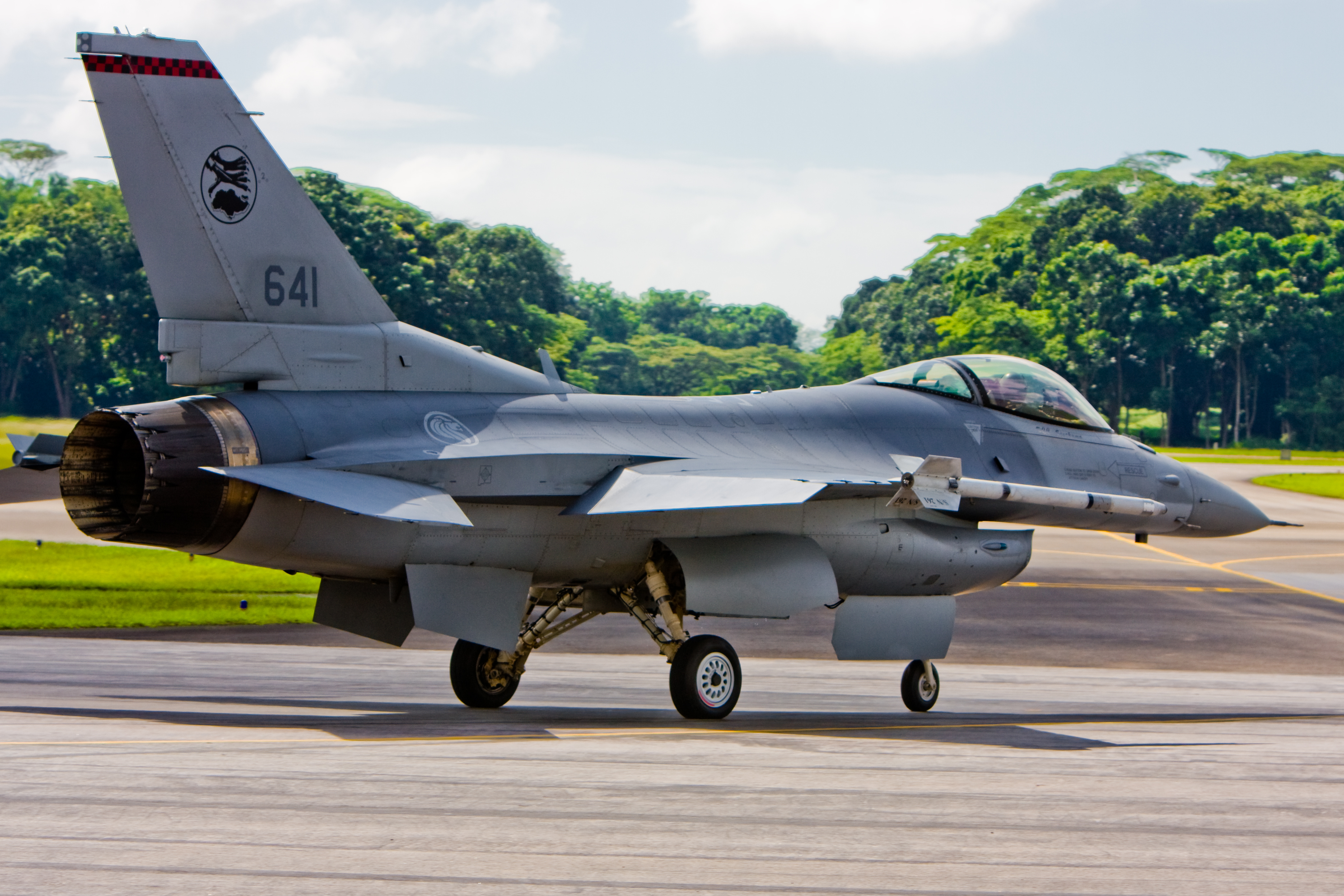
Same F-16C taxi-ing towards the runway for take-off.
