= 145 Squadron, Republic of Singapore Air Force =

Republic of Singapore Air Force fighter unit

RSAF 145 Squadron
- Active: 1984-present
- Role: Strike fighter
- Garrison/HQ: Tengah Air Base
- Mottos: "Swift & Valiant"
- Equipment: 20 F-16D+ Fighting Falcons

Insignia
- Identification symbol: A Hornet which is poised to sting.

The 145 Squadron "Hornet" is a strike fighter squadron of the Republic of Singapore Air Force based currently at Changi Airbase (East) which is a new airbase, opened in 2004, to the east of Singapore Changi Airport on reclaimed land. Due to ongoing construction works for Changi Airport Terminal 5 & runway expansion, this flight squadron is based at Tengah Airbase. With the hornet as its mascot, the squadron's motto is "Swift & Valiant".

== History ==
First formed on 1 April 1984 at Tengah Air Base, the founding CO was Capt Chir C. P " Hawkeye ", the squadron flew the A-4S Skyhawk and later, the locally upgraded A-4SU Super Skyhawk, along with her sister squadron, the 142 Squadron. When the A-4SU was retired from active combat service, however, 142 Squadron was disbanded, while the 145 Squadron was retained to operate the newly upgraded F-16Ds from the new air base, an unsurprising decision considering the fact that the 145 Squadron had emerged as the best fighter squadron for five consecutive years since the year 2000 in the annual Singapore Armed Forces Best Unit Competition.

== New role ==
The twenty aircraft of the squadron are upgraded versions of the F-16D Block 52, hence known as the Block 52+ or F-16D+, are equipped with state-of-the-art Conformal Fuel Tanks, an enhanced radar with greater detection range and improved mapping capabilities, and an improved targeting pod, this enables the squadron to conduct precision day and night operations at a greater combat range and duration. This made it a unique squadron within the RSAF as all its aircraft are tandem seaters and every mission is flown with a Pilot and Weapon System Officer (WSO), until the arrival of the F-15SG Eagles with 142 and 149 Squadrons.

== Information ==
The tail is adorned with a toned down squadron logo in the center of the tail with the serial number on the base and a blue checkered tailband. It is the only fighter squadron which chose an insect as its mascot.

== Achievements ==
The squadron has won the Best Fighter Squadron award in the following years: 1998, 2000, 2012, 2014, and 2026.

== Aircraft operated ==
1. 16× T/A-4SU Super Skyhawks (1984–2004)
2. 32× F-16Cs/Ds&D+sFighting Falcons (2004–present)

== Latest photo ==
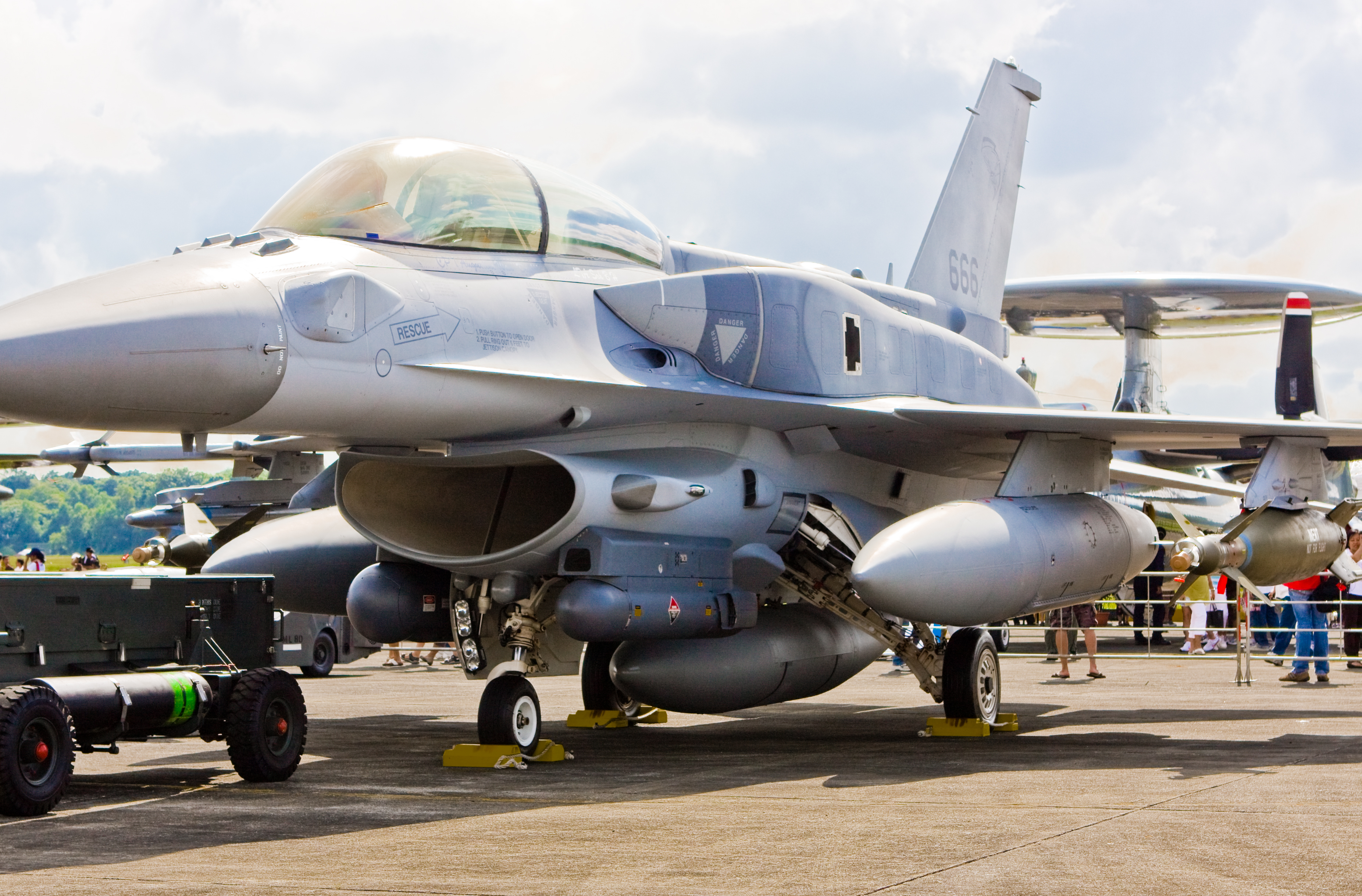
A fully bombed-up F-16D Block 52+ of 145 Sqn on static display during RSAF Open House 2008

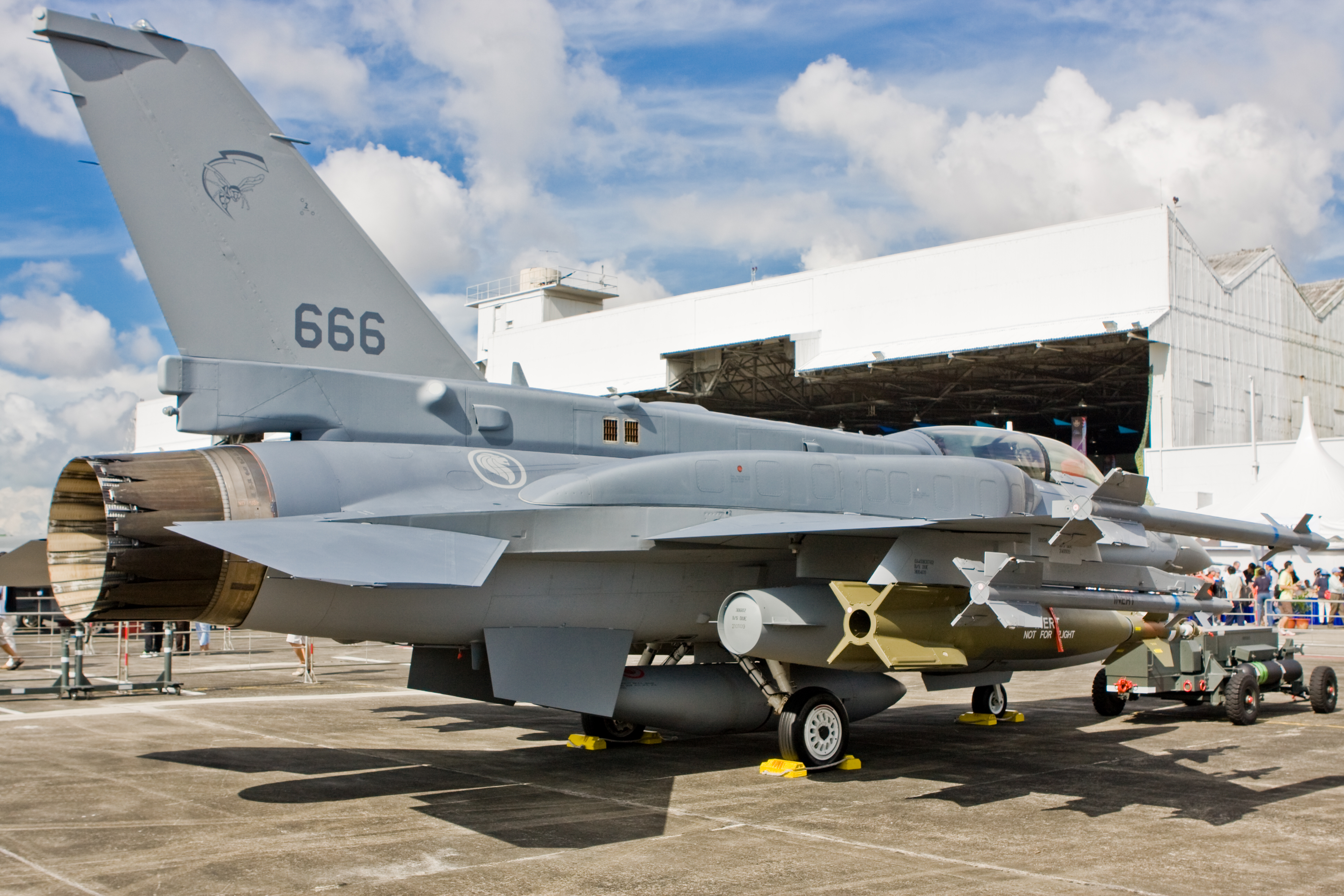
Rear view of the same aircraft

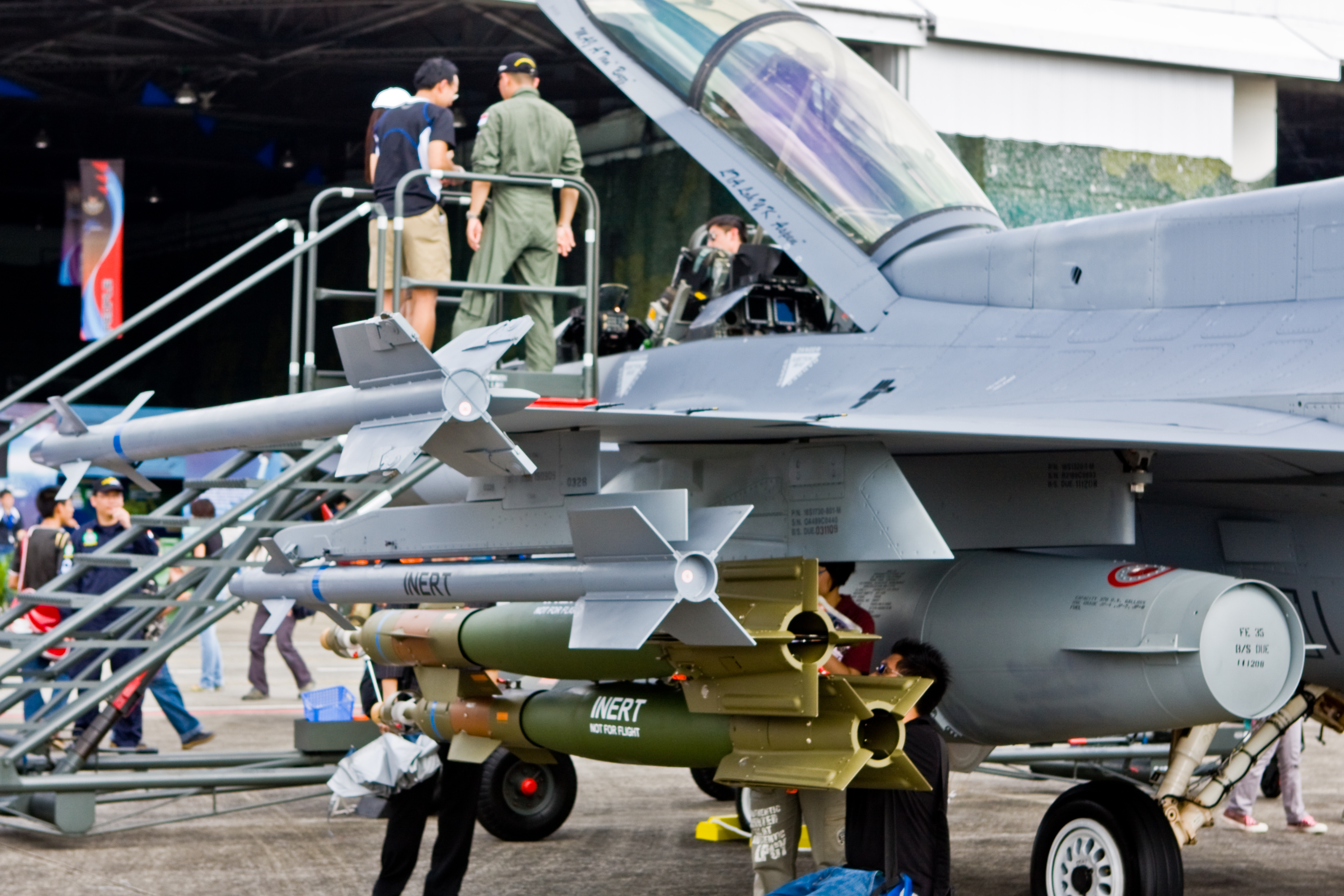
Another view, note the inert Sidewinder missiles and Paveway II LGBs
