= 127 Squadron, Republic of Singapore Air Force =

Singapore Air Force squadron

RSAF 127 Squadron
- Active: 1996-present
- Role: Transport, Search and rescue
- Garrison/HQ: Sembawang Air Base
- Mottos: "Strength, Courage, Swiftness"
- Equipment: CH-47F/CH-47SD Chinooks

Insignia
- Identification symbol: A white horse in full battle armour

The 127 Squadron is a helicopter squadron of the Republic of Singapore Air Force. The squadron goes by the motto of "Strength, Courage, Swiftness", the motto is supported by the squadron motif, a white horse in full battle armour.

== Unit history ==
Formed at Sembawang Air Base in 1996, the 127 Squadron consisted of six newly purchased CH-47D initially with another ten CH-47SD Chinooks added to the squadron strength by 1999. The squadron was set up to provide the RSAF with much needed help in the heavylift/support role of troop-lift and equipment transportation. Occasionally, the squadron's Chinooks are used to augment 125 Sqn & 126 Sqn in Search & Rescue (SAR) operations.

One such incident happened on 18 December 2008 at 1612hrs (Singapore Standard Time), when a multi-role survey vessel of the Royal Navy— HMS Echo, made a call for assistance to the RSAF's Air operation centre (AOC) requesting for emergency evacuation of an unconscious crew. As HMS Echo was then outside the normal operational range of 125 Sqn's SAR Super Pumas, LTC Vincent Chin of AOC decided to launch one of 127 Sqn's Chinook helicopter to undertake the task of long-range medical evacuation (Medevac). Within 45 minutes from the time of activation, the squadron's commanding officer—LTC Low Chung Guan along with co-pilot MAJ Andy Lim and Medical Officer CPT (Dr) Charles Goh was in the air. The unconscious casualty, Leading rating (LH) Cleary, was subsequently airlifted to National University Hospital in Singapore for medical treatment, whereupon he made a full recovery. On 29 December 2008, while docked at Singapore, Commander Gary Brooks of HMS Echo commented that "if LH Cleary had not received medical attention for just another four to six hours, he might not have survived."; Commander Brooks then thanked the RSAF and 127 Sqn for their prompt response and professionalism demonstrated during this medical emergency.

During Singapore's annual National Day Parade, the Chinooks of 127 Sqn have flown the national flag over the parade venue since 2000.

=== Training detachment ===
From 1996 until 2018, the squadron maintained a training detachment (Peace Prairie CH-47 Training) at Redmond Taylor AHP in (Grand Prairie, Texas) with six CH-47Ds.

In June 2018, the entire detachment was relocated to Oakey Army Aviation Centre in Queensland, Australia following a decision by the Singaporean Ministry of Defence (MINDEF) to consolidate and enhance the training process between the RSAF and the Singapore Army in Shoalwater Bay training area.

=== Replacement ===
On 7 November 2016, a press release by MINDEF was issued after a decision was made to acquire ten new build CH-47Fs to replace the six older D-models which has been in service since 1996. Concurrently, the ten CH-47SDs were to undergo a modernisation process to bring them up to the same standard as the CH-47Fs. In 2024, CH-47Fs attained full operational capability. Previously operated CH-47SDs and the newly acquired CH-47Fs are split between 126 and 127 Squadron.

== Aircraft operated ==
1. 6× CH-47D (1996–2022)
2. ??× CH-47SD Chinooks (1999–present)
3. ??× CH-47F Chinooks (2023–present)
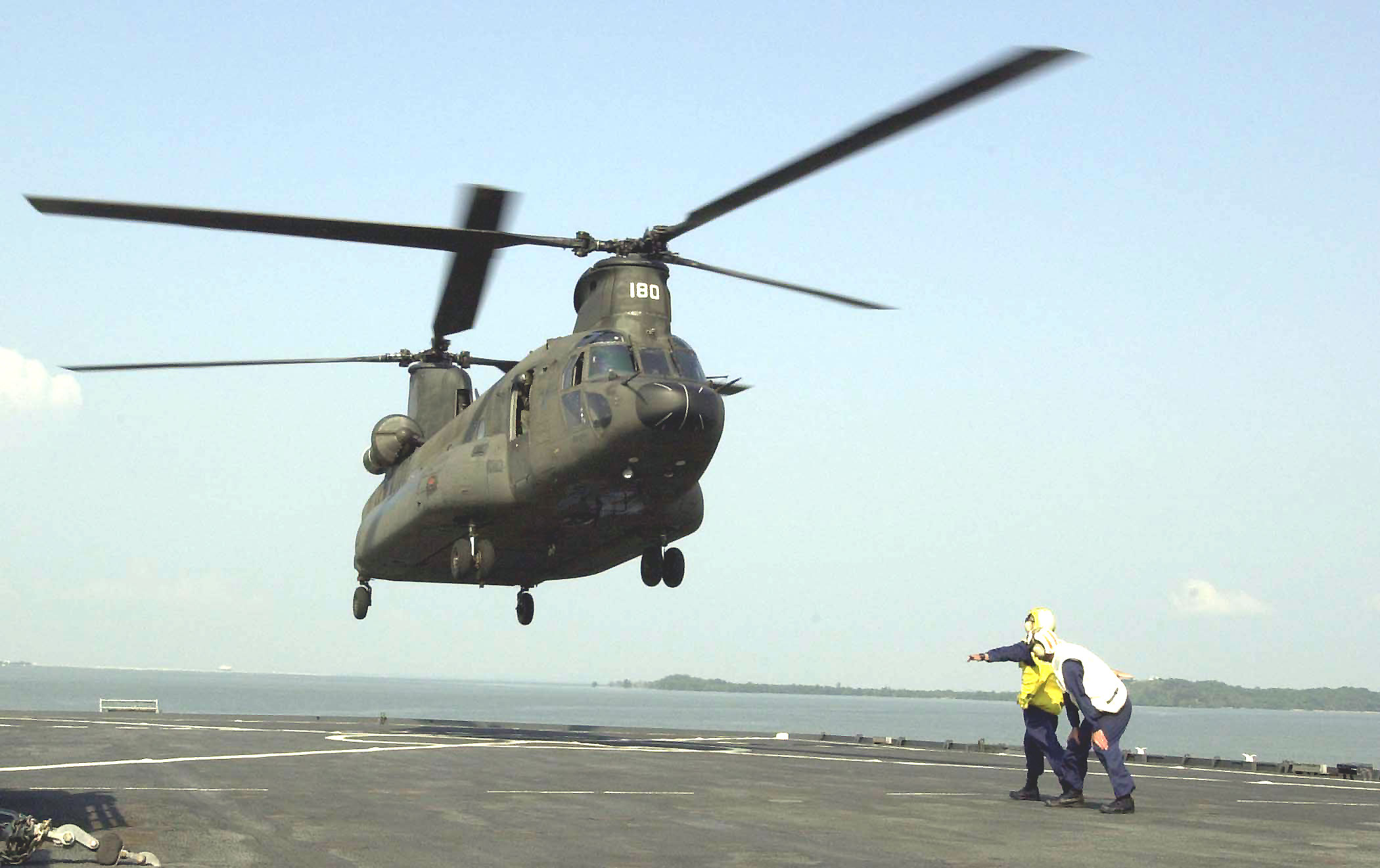
127 Sqn's CH-47SD lands aboard USS Rushmore during Exercise CARAT 2001

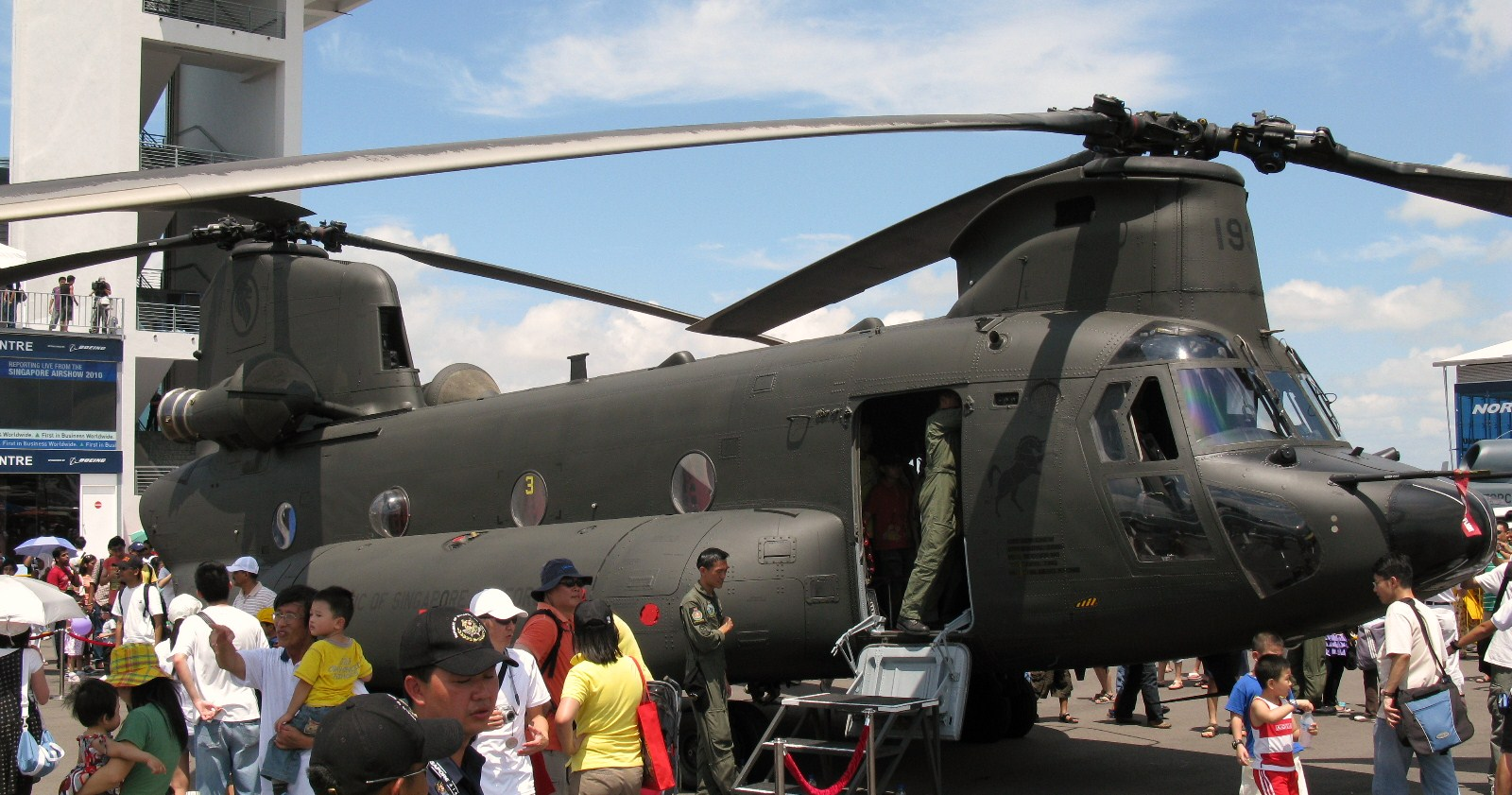
Singapore Airshow 2010: A CH-47SD of 127 Sqn on static display
