= 120 Squadron, Republic of Singapore Air Force =

Singapore Air Force squadron

RSAF 120 Squadron
- Active: 1969-present
- Role: Anti-Armour & Ground support
- Garrison/HQ: Sembawang Air Base
- Motto: "Strive To Achieve"
- Equipment: AH-64D Apache Longbow

Insignia
- Identification symbol: Kestrel

The 120 Squadron "Kestrel" (also known as the "Red Hawks") is a helicopter squadron of the Republic of Singapore Air Force based at Sembawang Air Base. First formed in 1969, it is the first and oldest RSAF operational squadron in service. The squadron goes by the motto of "Strive To Achieve". Since 2006, it operates the AH-64D Apache Longbow attack helicopter and has participated in Singapore's National Day Parade together with 127 Squadron CH-47SD Chinook for the traditional National Flag Fly Pass.

== Roles and missions ==
The AH-64D Apache Longbows of the squadron, armed with its varied payload of AGM-114 Hellfire missiles, Hydra 70 rockets and a single 30 mm M230 Chain Gun, can be called upon in support of the SAF in any operations that requires it. Provisions has also been made to integrate the helicopters into the SAF's Integrated Knowledge-based Command and Control network, a concept similar to the United States Department of Defense's network-centric warfare doctrine. This locally developed Combat Management System integrates all the sensors and weapon systems on board, increases battlespace awareness and allows little time for the enemy to react due to the short sensor-to-shooter loops as it effectively shares information between its army and navy counterparts.

== Unit history ==
When the British decided in 1967 to withdraw their forces from the Far East, Singapore saw the need to build up its own armed forces. The Singapore Air Defence Command (SADC) was formed as part of the initial set-up. The Alouette Squadron, established in September 1969, thus lay the foundation for RSAF's helicopter force.

=== Alouette Squadron ===
External image
- 1971, an Alouette III of the squadron on detachment to Changi Air Base

The Alouette Squadron was initially based at the Seletar Airfield, occupying the Lockheed (now ST Aerospace) hangar. In January 1971, the Squadron became the first SADC unit to be deployed overseas when four of her aircraft participated in the Kuantan flood relief operation in Malaysia. Shortly thereafter, the Alouette Squadron gained operational status becoming the first operational unit in the SADC. Relocated to Changi Air Base shortly after New Year's Day 1972, the Squadron's main roles included search-and-rescue, air recce, internal security, rappelling, trooplift and logistics support.

=== New designation ===
On 16 December 1973, the squadron's designation was changed to 120 Squadron (120 SQN). The squadron continued to operate the Alouette IIIs until 1977, when the aircraft were no longer able to meet the SAF's growing needs. In 1977, three Bell 212s and seventeen UH-1Hs were acquired, and the helicopters joined the squadron in February and August respectively.

120 SQN initiated the RSAF's first permanent overseas detachment in September 1978, when three UH-1Hs were deployed to Brunei for the first time. Their role was primarily to support the SAF's jungle training conducted there.

Tasked with the duty of airborne Search and rescue around Singapore and parts of South China Sea, the Bell 212s operated from 1977 to 1985 when Super Puma helicopters of the 125 Squadron took over the duty.

In 1983, the squadron relocated for the last time and settled down at Sembawang Air Base as the helicopters had vacated Changi and settled in Kangaw Camp. Kangaw was then used as an artillery base, although it was previously a British airfield – RAF Sembawang or better known as HMS Simbang. When the Singapore Artillery shifted to Khatib Camp in 1983, Kangaw Camp was handed over to the RSAF and renamed as Sembawang Air Base (SBAB). Since then, SBAB became the focal point of helicopter operations and one of the five formations in the RSAF.

=== Notable deployments ===
In the 1980s, three dramatic events thrust 120 SQN into the headlines. In October 1980, the squadron starred in a high-rise rescue drama at the unfinished Raffles Tower in Battery Road. A Bell 212 was sent to rescue a crane operator from the roof of the building after a fire on the 18th floor had trapped him.

Then, in January 1983, three people had to be winched to safety from the Singapore Cable Car by a Bell 212 after a drill-ship accidentally ploughed into and severed the cables off the waters of World Trade Centre, Singapore.

The third occasion was the Hotel New World disaster in March 1986. After the hotel collapsed, 120 SQN deployed three UH-1Hs to the disaster site to provide round-the-clock casualty evacuation.

=== Other recognitions ===
As recent as October 2002, 120 SQN deployed a detachment of four UH-1H to East Timor in support of the UN peace keeping mission there.

Also amongst its achievements, the 120 SQN won several ASEAN Helicopter championships; and has been winning the best tactical support SQN for the years 88/89, 91/92, 94/95, 95/96 and 99/00.

== Aircraft operated ==
1. 8× SA316B Alouette III (1968–1978, subsequently transferred to Royal Malaysian Air Force)
2. 3× Bell 212 (1978–1985, subsequently sold to Sri Lanka Air Force)
3. 24× UH-1H (1978–2005) 17× UH-1H delivered in 1978 with another 2× UH-1D (later modernised to UH-1H standard) and 5× UH-1H supplied in 1984. In 2003, 7 airframes was modernised and sold to Philippine Air Force in a US$12 million deal.
4. 19× AH-64D (2006–present)

== Photo gallery ==
The old 120Sqn shoulder patch with the Skylark (Alouette in French) as the centerpiece.

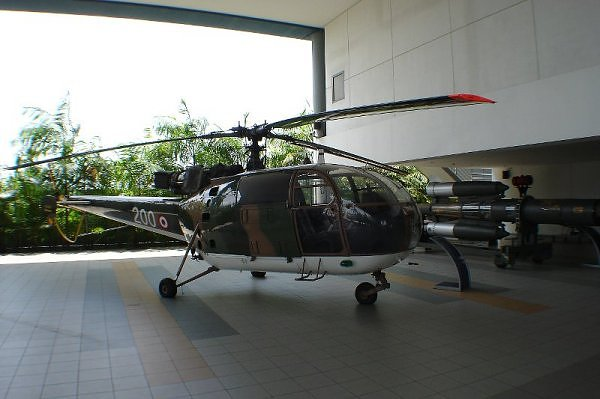
RSAF 1st helicopter in service - the Aérospatiale Alouette III (phased out of service in 1978) with 1st generation RAF styled roundels.

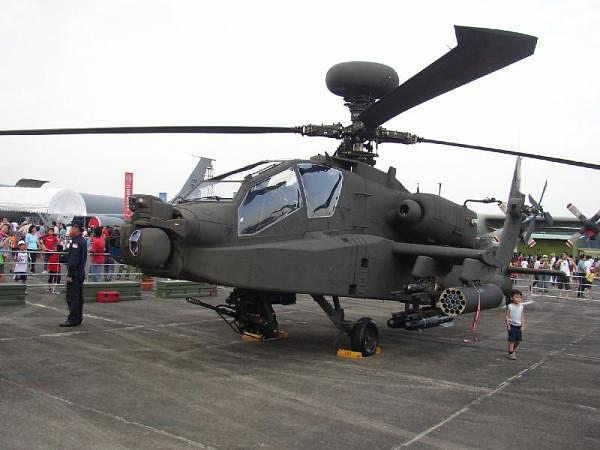
Static display of RSAF AH-64D Longbow Apache during open house.

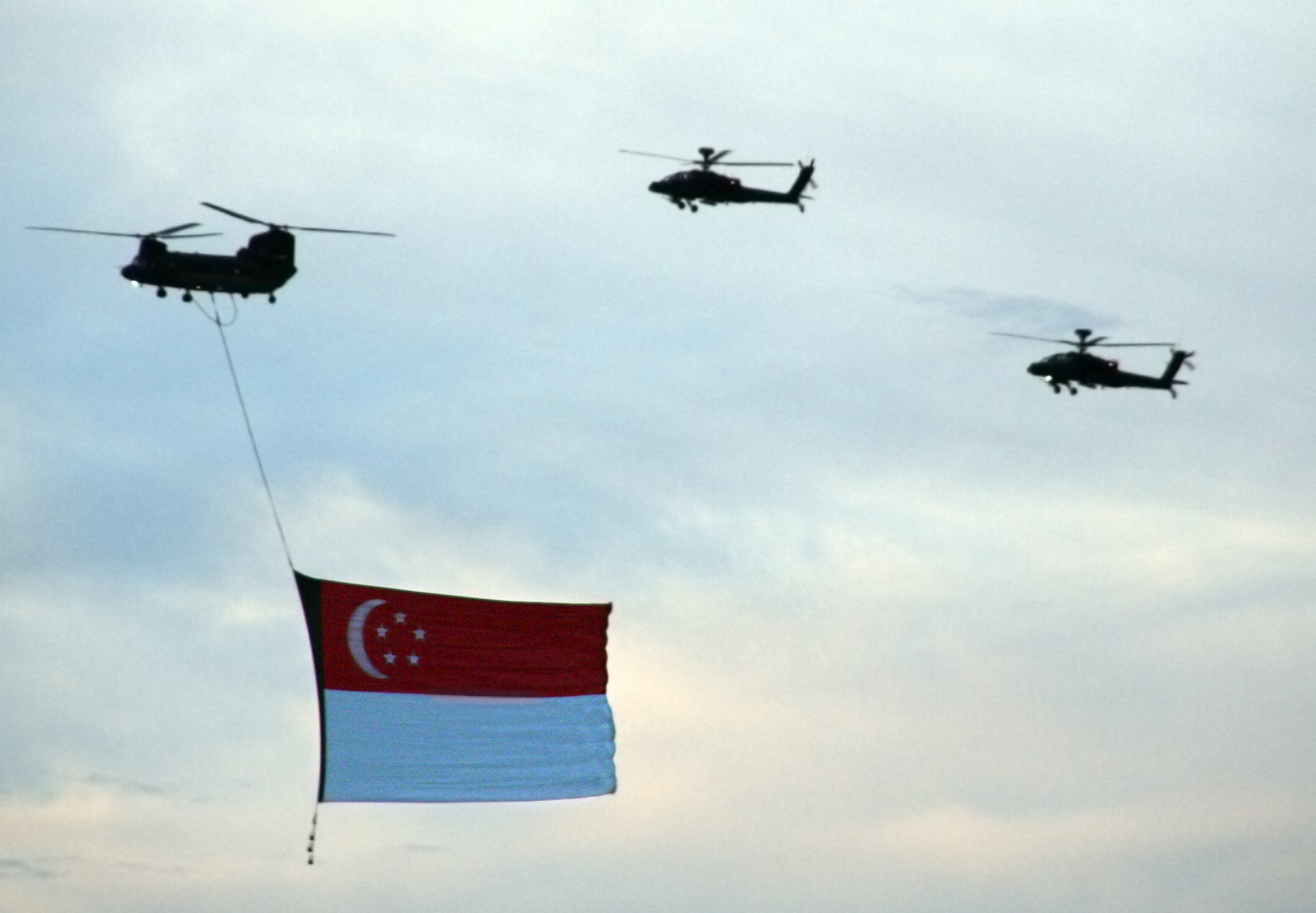
Two of 120 Sqn's AH-64D Apaches escorting a 127 Sqn's CH-47SD Chinook helicopter during the rehearsal for NDP 2006.
