= 121 Squadron, Republic of Singapore Air Force =

RSAF 121 Squadron
- Active: 1973
- Role: Maritime Patrol and Utility Transport
- Garrison/HQ: Changi Air Base
- Mottos: "Seek and Destroy"
- Equipment: Fokker 50

Insignia
- Identification symbol: Gannet: 1973-1994; Brahminy kite: 1994-present

The 121 Squadron "Brahminy Kite" ("Gannet" before 1994) of the Republic of Singapore Air Force (RSAF) currently operates the Fokker 50 Utility Aircraft (UTA) and Maritime Patrol Aircraft (MPA) based at Changi Airbase (West). The squadron goes by the motto of "Seek and Destroy" and the mascot is the brahminy kite.

== History ==
Set up in 1973 with the commissioning of the SH 7 Skyvan 3M into the service of SADC. In 1993, the squadron found a new chapter to their successful career when they began operating the Fokker F50 MPA and UTL. With this move, the squadron's mascot was changed from the gannet to the brahminy kite, which is also reflected as the current centerpiece of the squadron's crest. As of September 2008, the Squadron has maintain an impressive safety record of over 124,000 accident-free flying hours, spanning a period of 35 years since the squadron's inception.

== Roles and missions ==
The primary role of the F-50 is to provide dedicated wide area maritime air surveillance for search and rescue operations, aeromedical evacuations and the transportation of personnel. The 121Sqn is unique in the RSAF, it is the first RSAF squadron to be crewed by both RSAF and RSN personnels as the pilots are drawn from the RSAF while the equipment/system specialists are from the RSN. As such, the F-50 MPA is part of a MINDEF system that comprises both Republic of Singapore Air Force and Republic of Singapore Navy assets that are capable of operations in tandem for seeking out and destroying a naval surface or sub-surface target, they can be quickly re-armed with the Harpoon Anti-ship missiles or EuroTorp A244/S ASW torpedoes as and when they are required to. The other squadron which integrate both Naval and Air operations are personnel from 123 Squadron with the Seahawks.

The squadron covers a wide spectrum of operations round the clock. These include Humanitarian Assistance and Disaster Relief (HADR) efforts such as Operations Flying Eagle in the aftermath of the Asian tsunami in December 2004, regular patrols of Singapore’s Sea Lines of Communication as well as participation in the Malacca Straits “Eyes in the Sky” Joint Air Patrol with Indonesia and Malaysia.

== SAF award ==
Also, the squadron has won the Best Tactical Support Squadron award (Singapore Armed Forces Best Unit Competition) for the fourth time in 2008; its past achievements being in 1997, 2002 and 2003.

== Aircraft operated ==
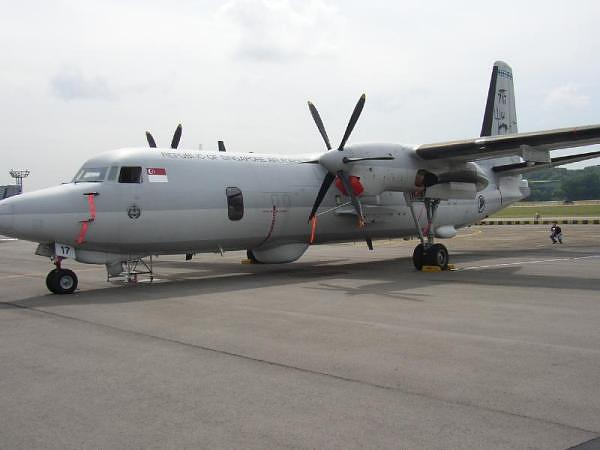
The Fokker F50 MPA of 121Sqn.

1. 8× SH 7 Skyvan 3M (1973–1993)
2. 9× Fokker F50 MPA/UTL (1993–present)
