= 149 Squadron, Republic of Singapore Air Force =

Republic of Singapore Air Force fighter unit

RSAF 149 Squadron
- Active: 1 June 1985-present
- Role: Fighter-bomber
- Garrison/HQ: Paya Lebar Air Base
- Motto: "Steadfast"
- Equipment: F-15SG Strike Eagle

Commanders
- Notable commanders: Ng Chee Khern

Insignia
- Identification symbol: Shikra

The 149 Squadron "Shikra" of the Republic of Singapore Air Force is a fighter-bomber squadron based at Paya Lebar Air Base. The squadron goes by the motto "Steadfast" with the Shikra adopted as its mascot.

== History ==
Based at Paya Lebar Air Base, 149 Squadron was inaugurated on 1 June 1985 as one of the RSAF's fighter squadrons operating in the interceptor role. The squadron initially operated the supersonic F-5E/F Tiger II fighter aircraft, before converting to the improved F-5S/T Tiger-IIs fighter aircraft in the early 1990s, these were retrofitted with new state-of-the-art avionics giving the aircraft capability of carrying out both air-to-air and air-to-ground missions.

On 5 April 2010, the squadron was re-inaugurated by Defence Minister Teo Chee Hean in an RSAF ceremony at Paya Lebar Air Base, with the arrival of five F-15SG strike fighters flown back the week before from Mountain Home Air Force Base in the United States.

== Information ==
The tail is adorned with a beige checkered tailband. The squadron's logo is centered with the serial number on the base of the tail.

== Achievements ==
The squadron found itself actively involved in several major multilateral exercises such as Exercise Bersama Shield and Bersama Lima under the ambit of the Five Power Defence Arrangements (FPDA), and Exercise Cope Tiger with the US and Thailand air forces in 2007. The squadron has also won the Best Fighter Squadron award in the Singapore Armed Forces Best Unit Competition eight times, in 1986, 1988, 2002, 2004, 2008, 2011, 2013 and 2018.

== Aircraft operated ==
1. 15× F-5S & 1× F-5T Tiger-IIs (1985–2010)
2. 24× F-15SG Strike Eagles (2010–present)

== Photo gallery ==
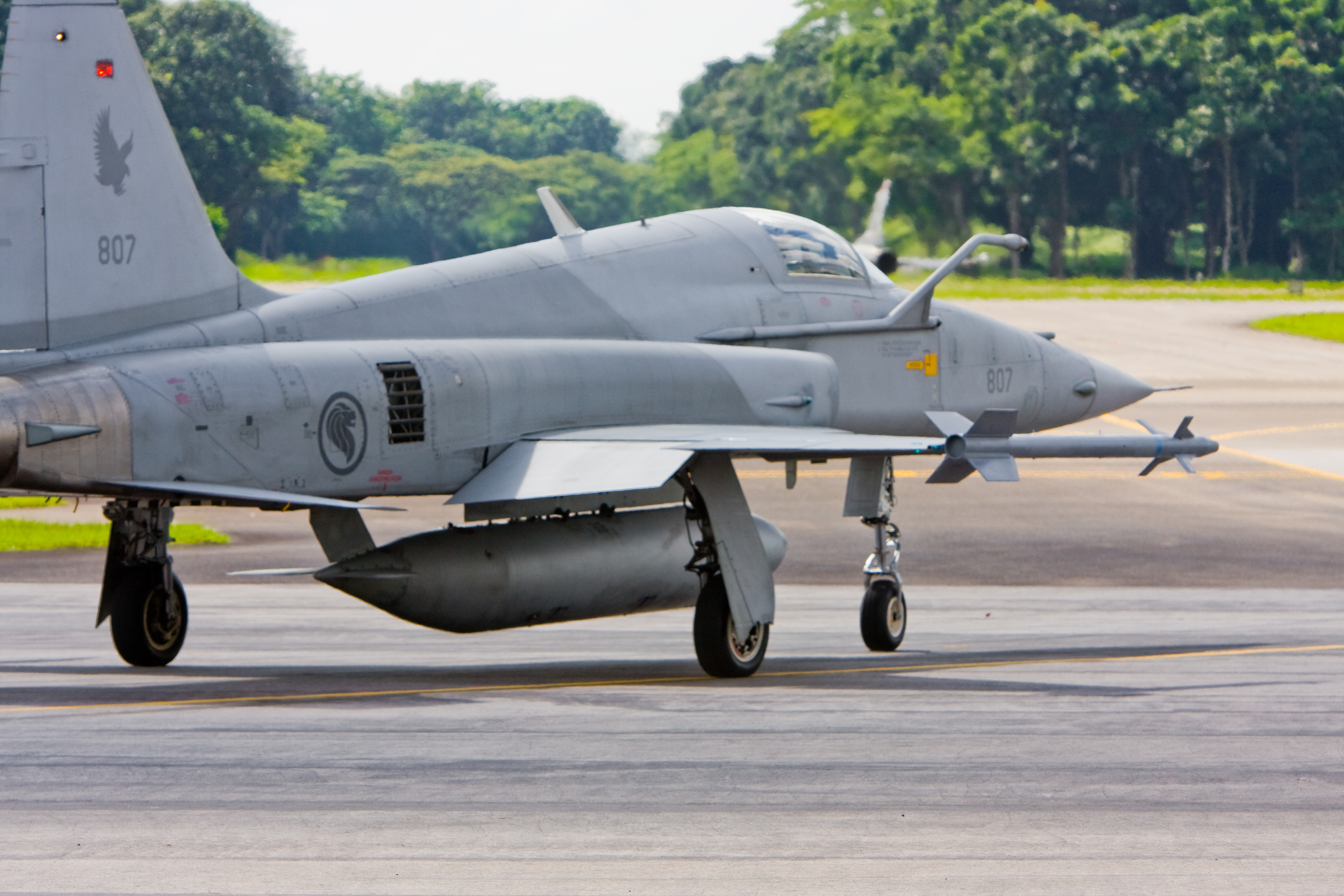
An F-5S Tiger-IIs of 149 Sqn taxiing towards the runway.

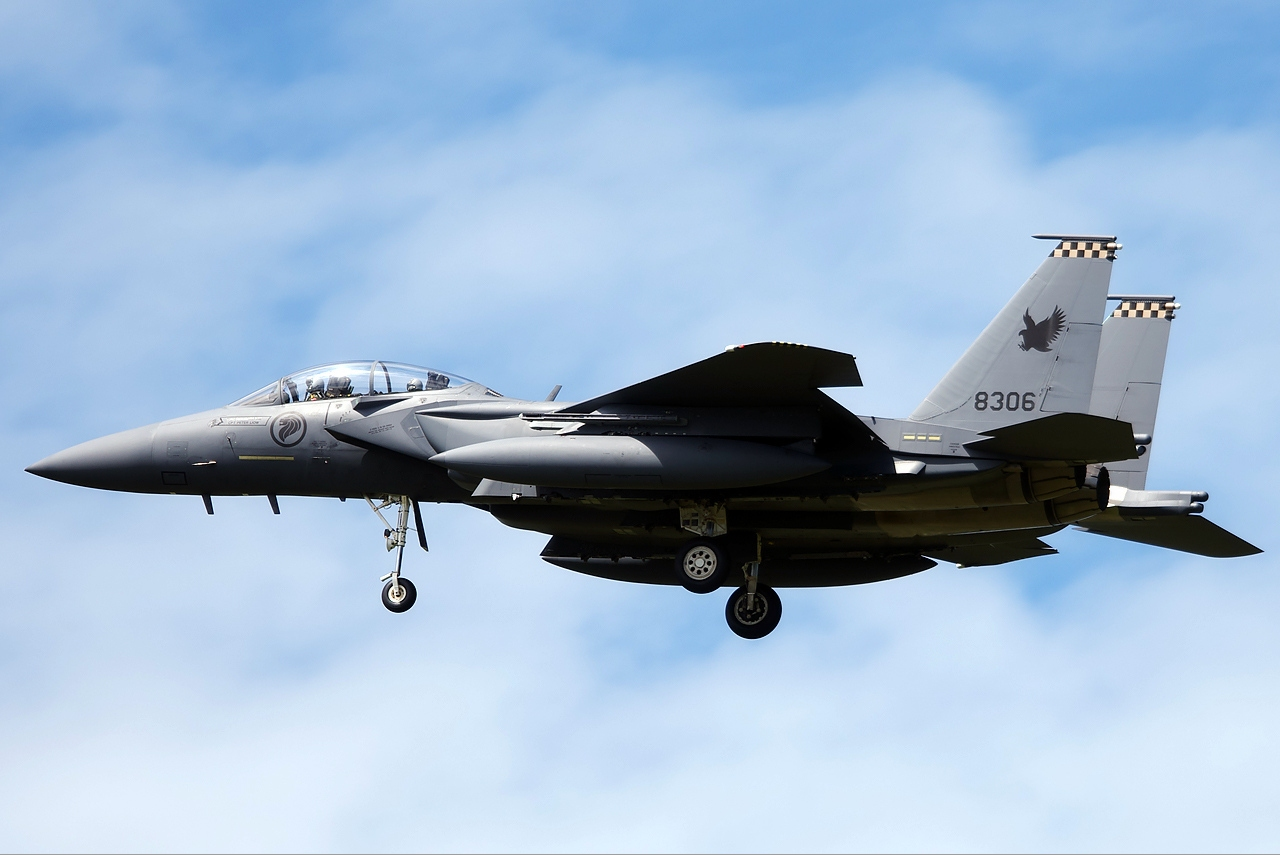
149 Sqn's F-15SG at Darwin Airport, 2011.
