= 165 Squadron, Republic of Singapore Air Force =

RSAF 165 Squadron
- Active: 1983
- Role: Air Defence
- Garrison/HQ: Chong Pang Camp
- Motto: "Pride in Protection"
- Equipment: Rapier surface-to-air missiles, Rafael SPYDER

The 165 Squadron is an Air Defence Group squadron of the Air Defence and Operations Command, Republic of Singapore Air Force (RSAF). It has operated the Surface-to-air PYthon-5 and DERby (SPYDER) Ground-Based Air Defence System since 2011, achieving Full Operational Capability in 2018.

Before SPYDER, it operated the RAPIER air defence system purchased from British Aerospace since 1983, providing air defence cover against low-flying aircraft. The RSAF replaced its RAPIER air defence system with the SPYDER ground based air defence system in 2011.

With its motto, "Pride in Protection", the squadron conducted its first live-firing exercise at the Royal Artillery Range in Hebrides, the United Kingdom in July 1984, and participated in its first overseas deployment exercise in 1985 in Exercise Air Thai-Sing (now known as Exercise Cope Tiger) at Chandy Range in Thailand.

== History ==
The 165 Squadron, then known as 165 SADA, was officially formed on 1 August 1983 with the acquisition of the Rapier missile after an air defence study in 1978. Formed at Changi Camp, it was established on 1 September 1985, before becoming fully operationally ready a year later.

In 1987, the battalion shifted to Lim Chu Kang Camp II. Full-time National Servicemen were added to its ranks in 1988. In July 2006, ADSD became ADOC (Air Defence Operations Command) and ADB became ADG (Air Defence Group).

In 2014, the unit moved to Chong Pang Camp, where it current operates the Surface-to-Air PYthon and DERby - Short Range (SPYDER-SR) ground-based air defence system.
