= 126 Squadron, Republic of Singapore Air Force =

RSAF 126 Squadron
- Active: 1996-present
- Role: Transport, Search and rescue
- Garrison/HQ: Sembawang Air Base
- Mottos: "Ready and Able"
- Equipment: CH-47SD Chinooks/CH-47F

Insignia
- Identification symbol: Cougar

The 126 Squadron "Cougar" is a helicopter squadron of the Republic of Singapore Air Force. Its motto is "Ready and Able", with the Cougar adopted as the squadron's motif.

== Unit history ==
Formed initially on 16 September 1992 at Sembawang Air Base, the 126 Squadron consisted of fourteen newly purchased Aérospatiale AS532UL Cougar medium lift helicopters, which were an upgraded version of the Super Puma helicopters then used by its sister squadron – 125 SQN.

In 1998, the squadron was temporarily deployed at Oakey Airbase, for operators to train with the Eurocopter AS332 Super Puma in a large training airspace.

In 2023, a 25th-anniversary celebration was held at Oakey, which involved several high ranking dignitaries visiting and the unveiling of a commemorative tail design painted on a RSAF Chinook.

After the CH-47F attained full operational capability for the RSAF, the squadron transitioned to a mix of CH-47SDs and CH-47Fs.

== Roles and Missions ==
In May 1993, the RSAF deployed four Super Puma helicopters and 65 personnel to assist with the United Nations Transitional Authority in Cambodia in conducting the 1993 Cambodian general election, where they ferried election officials and conducted aerial policing. This was the RSAF's first every UN peacekeeping mission.

== Aircraft operated ==
1. 14× AS532UL Cougars (1996–2023)
2. ??x CH-47SD Chinooks (2023–present)
3. ??x CH-47F Chinooks (2023–present)

== Photo gallery ==
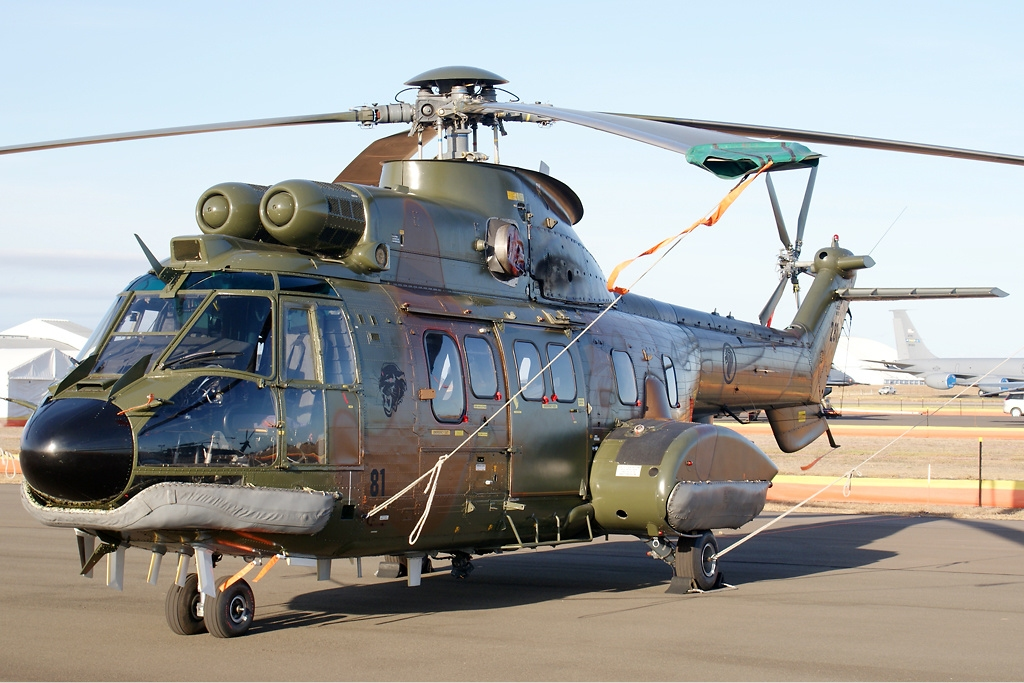
126 Sqn's AS532UL Cougar at Avalon Airport, 2009.
