= 111 Squadron, Republic of Singapore Air Force =

Singapore Air Force squadron

RSAF 111 Squadron
- Active: 1987–present
- Role: Airborne Early Warning and Control
- Garrison/HQ: Tengah Air Base
- Motto(s): "Vigilance in Control"
- Equipment: Gulfstream G550 CAEW

Insignia
- Identification symbol: Represented by the head of a Jaeger, a vigilant and courageous hawk-like bird.

The 111 Squadron "Jaeger" was formed when the Republic of Singapore Air Force acquired four Grumman E-2C Hawkeye Airborne Early Warning aircraft in 1987. Based at Tengah Air Base, its primary function is to perform airborne surveillance and early warning. Other functions include Aircraft Intercept Control, Surface Surveillance, Search and Rescue and Air Traffic Control.

The unit is represented by the Jaeger, a vigilant and courageous hawk-like bird whose vigilance is aptly reflected in their motto "Vigilance in Control".

== History ==
Since the early 1990s, as one of the signatory members of Five Power Defence Arrangements (FPDA), Singapore has regularly deployed the squadron's Hawkeye to participate in the air exercise part of the Integrated Air Defence System (IADS) phase.

== Overview ==
In 2001, RSAF working together with the Defence Science and Technology Agency (DSTA) upgraded the entire computer and software systems of the E-2C. State-of-the-art equipment was adapted to the harsh military environment and millions of lines of code were rewritten. Interfaces between the various E-2C subsystems were also designed and enhanced.

The RSAF acquired four Gulfstream G550 jets with the IAI EL/W-2085 Active Electronically Scanned Array (AESA) dual-band phased array radar (a newer derivative of the Phalcon system) for CAEW duties from Israel Aerospace Industries (IAI) in 2007, at least 2 aircraft were delivered in late 2008 and are expected to be fully operational by 2010. Not included in the deal is an additional G550 as an AEW trainer, which will be acquired and maintained by ST Aerospace on behalf of RSAF.

During the 2010 Singapore Airshow, the squadron unveiled the new aircraft, which had been further upgraded, at the display pavilion.

== Aircraft operated ==
1. 4× E-2C Hawkeyes (USN BuNos 162793/162796, RSAF serials 011/012/014/015, 1987–2010s)
2. 4× G550 CAEW (2008–present)
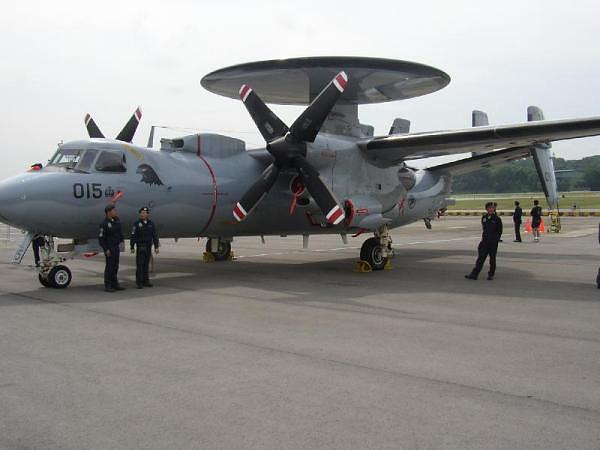
An E-2C Hawkeye (015) of 111 Sqn on display at Paya Lebar Air Base, 2006

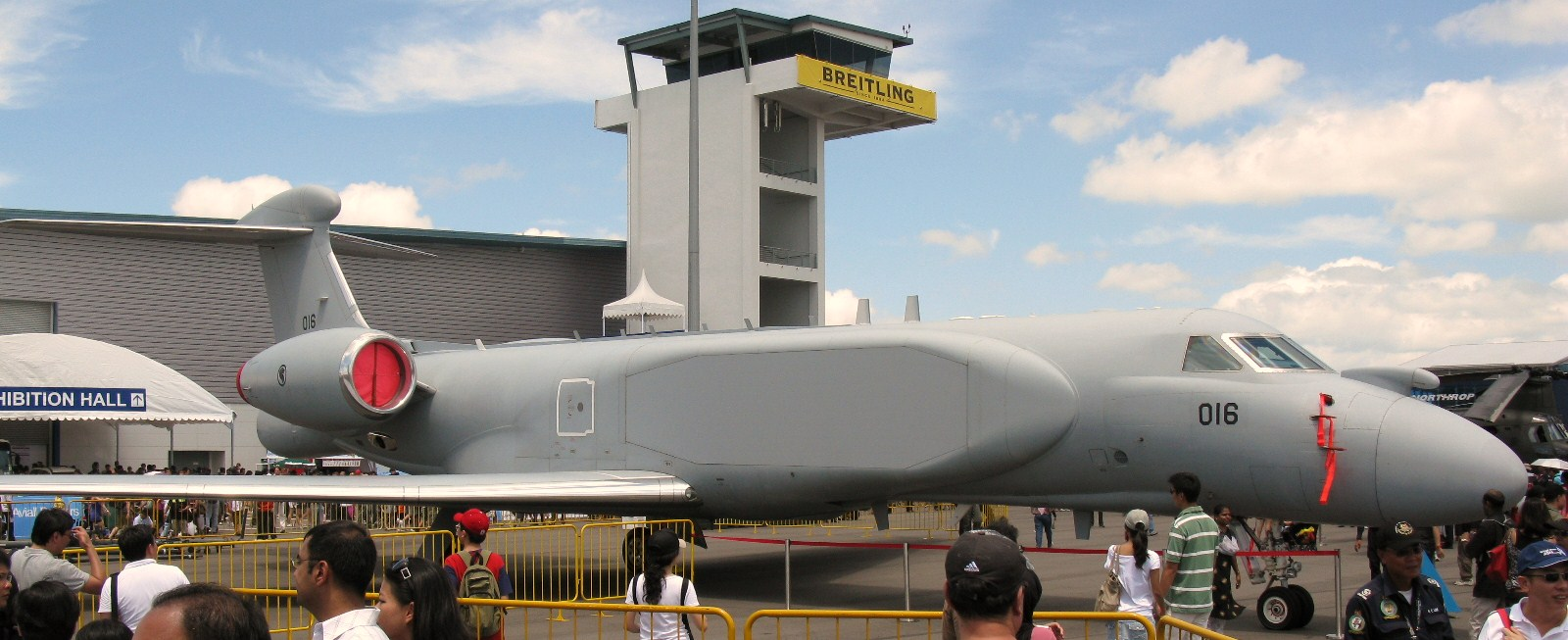
An operational G550 CAEW of 111 Sqn on display at Singapore Airshow, 2010
