= 125 Squadron, Republic of Singapore Air Force =

Singapore Air Force squadron

RSAF 125 Squadron
- Active: 1985-present
- Role: Transport, Search and rescue
- Garrison/HQ: Sembawang Air Base
- Motto: "Swift And Bold"
- Equipment: Airbus H225M

Insignia
- Identification symbol: Starling

The 125 Squadron "Starling" is a helicopter squadron based at Sembawang Air Base, Republic of Singapore Air Force. Established in 1985, the squadron goes by the motto "Swift And Bold", with the Starling as the squadron's motif.

== Unit history ==
Formed in February 1985, 125 Squadron consisted of twenty-two newly purchased Aérospatiale AS332M Super Puma medium lift helicopters. This was the Republic of Singapore Air Force's third helicopter squadron, after 120 Sqn and 123 Sqn. The pilots for the new helicopters were drawn from the two squadrons and led by Major Chia Sin Kwong, and were sent to France to undergo initial training.

The first Super Puma made its way to Singapore in July 1985 and the squadron was officially inaugurated on 4 October 1985 by then Chief of General Staff, Major-General Winston Choo. The Super Pumas enabled the transportation of troops and light vehicles in support of Singapore Army requirements. Three of the squadron's Super Pumas were painted in a special red and white scheme for the conducting of Search and rescue (SAR), taking over from the SAR-configured Bell 212 Twin Huey helicopters of 120 Sqn, which were retired the same year. Since then, 125 Squadron has stood on standby for SAR and medivac duties around the clock.

The Super Pumas enabled the transport of troops and light vehicles.

From 1986 to 1999, the Super Pumas of 125 Squadron flew the national flag during Singapore's National Day Parade.

125 Squadron has also won the Best Unit Award on several occasions: it won the Best Helicopter Squadron award (since the award's inception in 2010) in 2014, followed by a record-setting four consecutive awards from 2017-2020. Prior to that, it previously only won best unit awards on two occasions- both under the "Air Combat Support" banner- once in 1999, and before then with their inaugural win (in 1993 under then Commanding Officer, Major S. Thanabalan).

In 2010, then Commanding Officer Leftenant-Colonel Ong Jack Sen and the squadron celebrated the 25th anniversary of Super Puma operations in the RSAF.

In November 2016, it was announced that the AS332M Super Puma platform would be replaced by the new Airbus H225M. The RSAF acquired its first order of the new aircraft in 2021, as the COVID-19 pandemic had delayed its initial projected delivery of end-2020. In 2022, the H225M assumed the role of SAR standby duties from the Super Puma.

The H225M was declared fully operational on 11 April 2024, in a combined Full Operational Capability (FOC) Ceremony with the CH-47F heavy-lift helicopters.

== Aircraft operated ==
1. 22× AS332M Super Puma (1985–2023)
2. 16x H225M (2021–present)
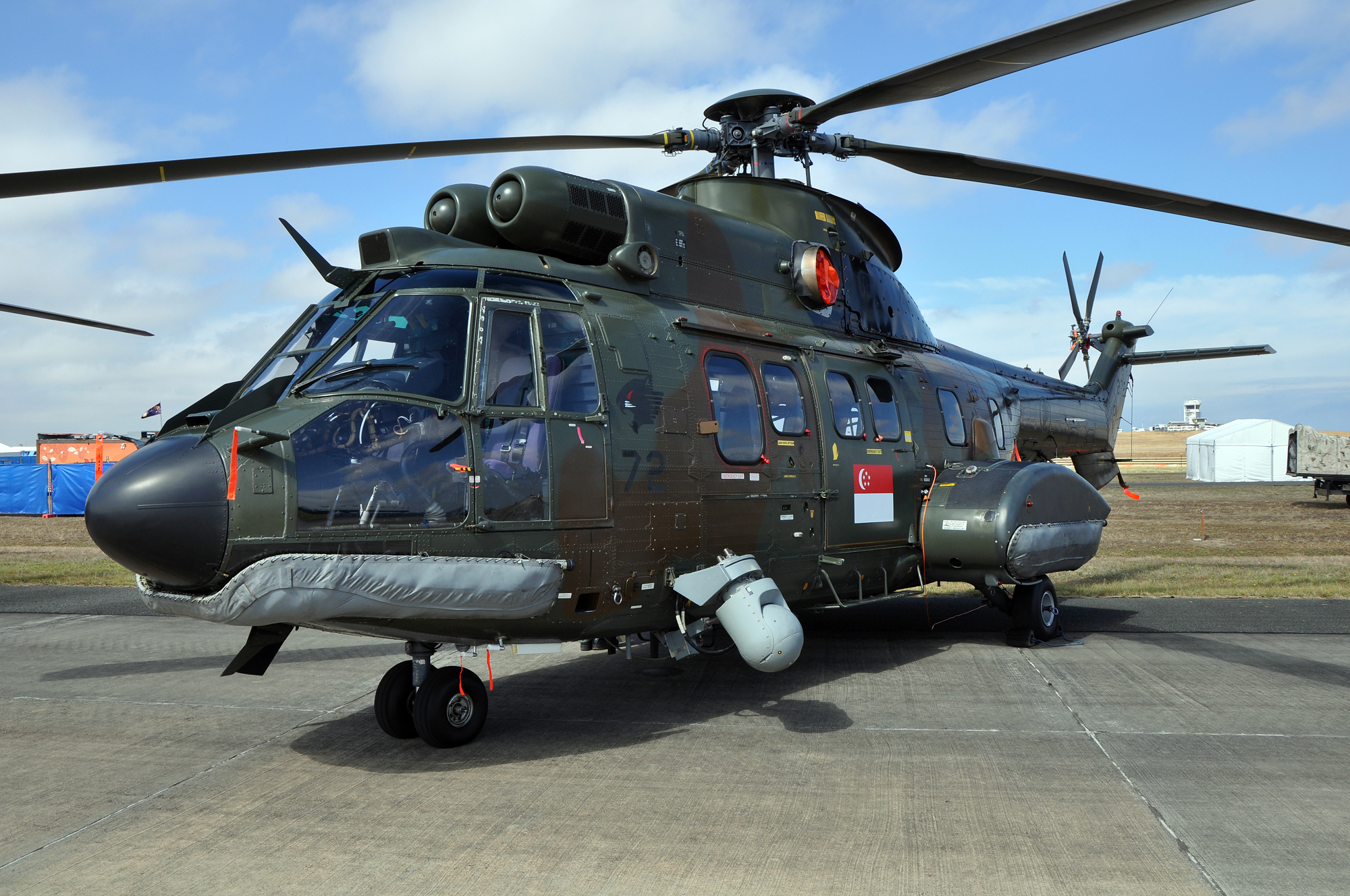
125 Sqn Eurocopter AS332 Super Puma on display

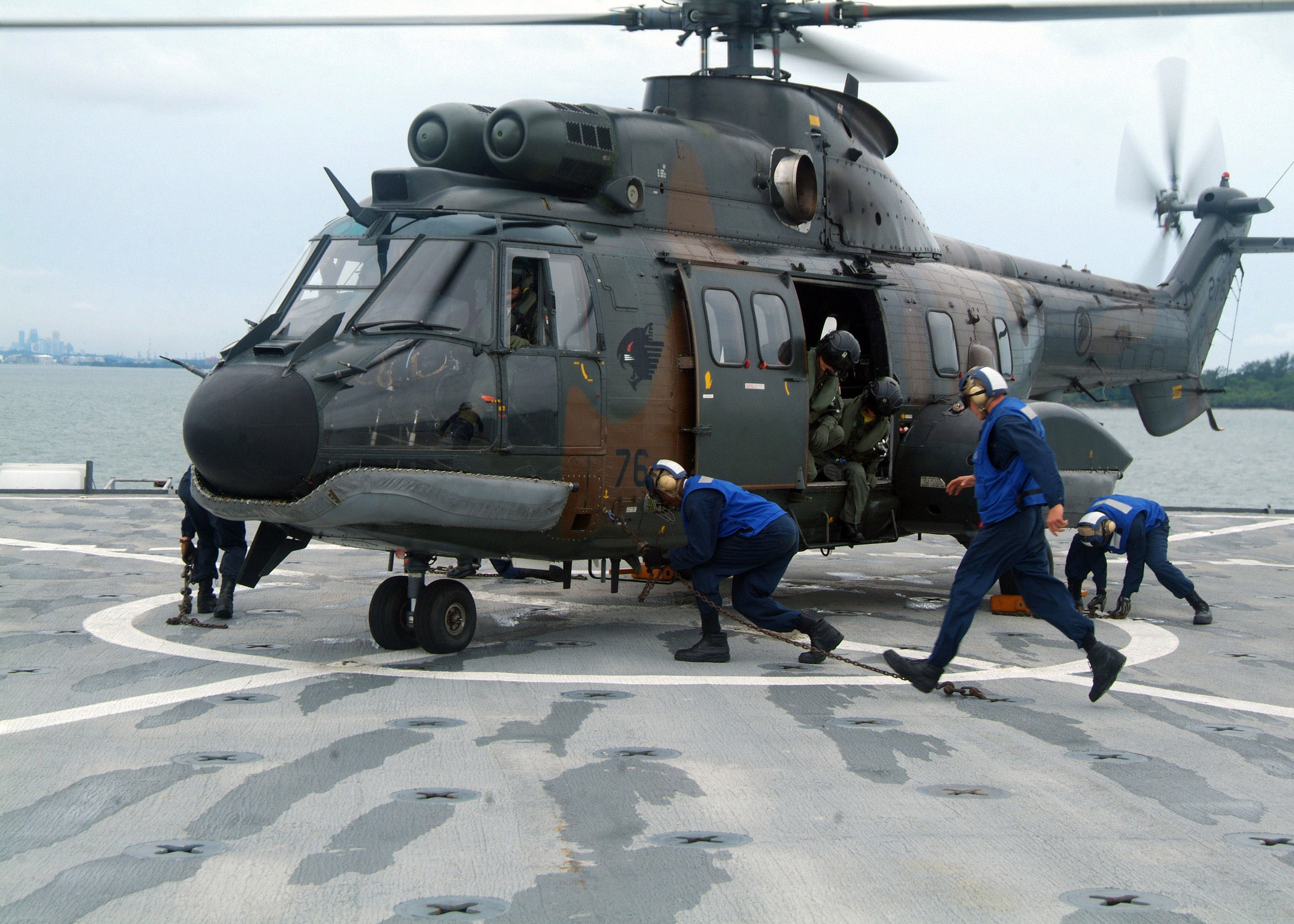
Super Puma onboard USS Harpers Ferry during CARAT 2007
