= SIAI-Marchetti S.211 =

Military trainer aircraft

S.211/S-211
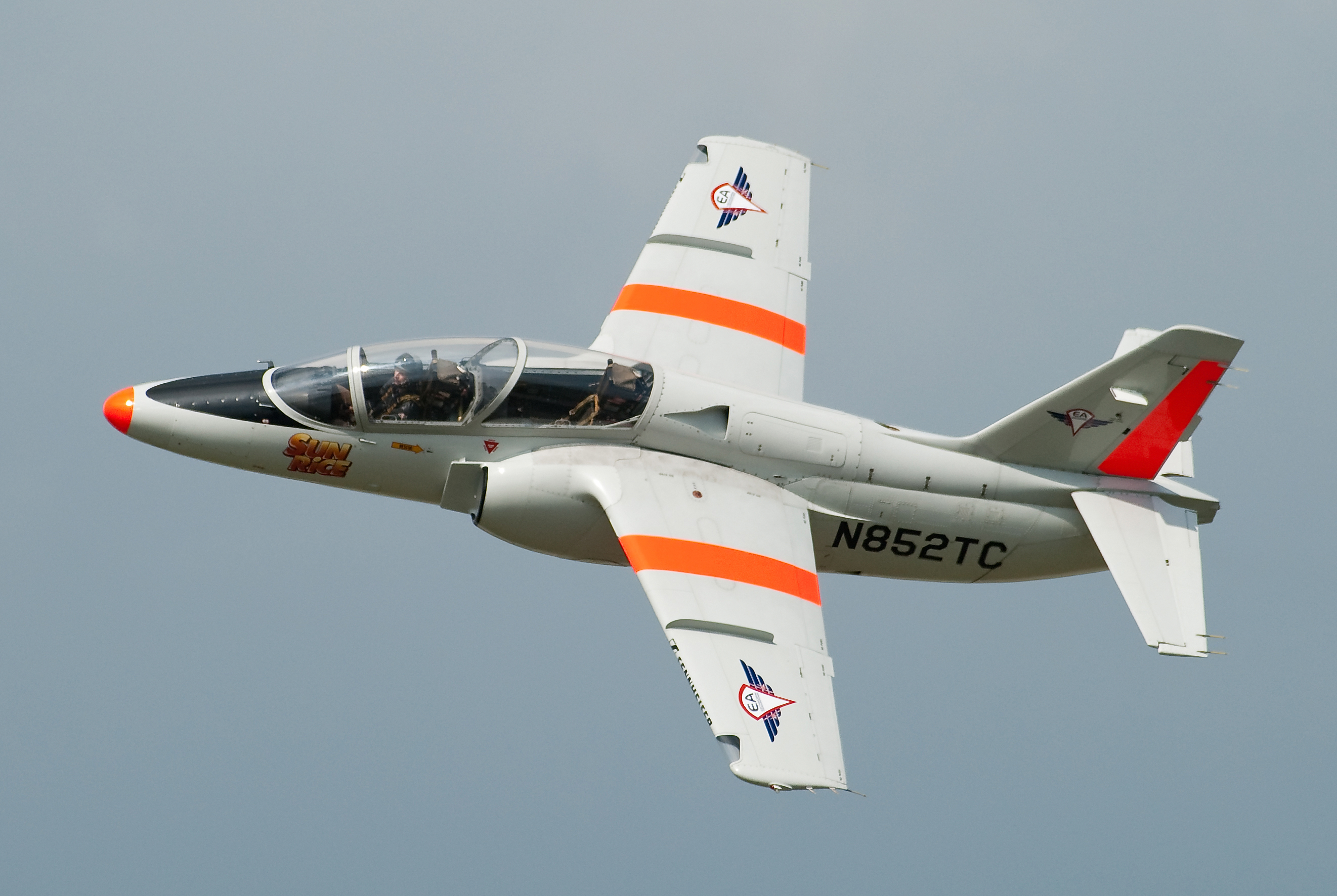

General information
- Type: Jet trainer / Light attack aircraft
- National origin: Italy
- Manufacturer: SIAI-Marchetti; Aermacchi
- Status: Active service with the Philippine Air Force
- Primary users: Republic of Singapore Air Force (historical) Philippine Air Force; Haitian Air Force (historical)
- Number built: ~60

History
- Manufactured: 1981–1994
- Introduction date: 1984
- First flight: 10 April 1981
- Developed into: Aermacchi M-345

The SIAI-Marchetti S.211 (later Aermacchi S-211) is a turbofan-powered military trainer aircraft designed and originally marketed by Italian aviation manufacturer SIAI-Marchetti.

SIAI-Marchetti started to develop the S-211 in 1976 as a private venture initiative, announcing its existence during the following year. In April 1981, the first prototype performed its maiden flight. The Singapore Air Force placed the first order for ten aircraft in 1983. Some 60 aircraft have been sold to air forces around the world. Following Aermacchi's purchase of SIAI-Marchetti in 1997, the former has held the production rights to the type. An extensively redesigned and modernised derivative, the Aermacchi M-345, has been developed by Alenia Aermacchi, and entered service in 2020.

== Development ==
In 1976, Italian aircraft company SIAI-Marchetti began work on what would become the S-211. The project was undertaken as a private venture to develop a new basic trainer aircraft. SIAI-Marchetti planned to offer the type to the company's existing customer base, consisting of various air forces around the world that operated their SF.260, a piston-engined trainer. The programme's existence was announced in Paris in 1977. Reportedly, customer interest was strong enough to justify the construction of two prototypes, the first of which flew on 10 April 1981. In 1983, the Singapore Air Force placed the first order for the S-211, for ten aircraft.

The S-211A was a slightly modified and updated variant of the S-211, was a losing contender in the United States Air Force's Joint Primary Aircraft Training System (JPATS) aircraft selection. Among the seven aircraft to enter, the Raytheon/Pilatus entry emerged as the winner, being produced as the T-6 Texan II. The S-211 team was initially partnered with American aircraft company Grumman. Following its merger with Northrop Corporation in 1994, SIAI-Marchetti worked with Northrop Grumman on the S-211A up until the selection.

In 1997, rival Italian aviation firm Aermacchi acquired SIAI-Marchetti and thereby the S-211. According to Aermacchi, the acquisition would enable significant cost savings in production following consolidation to its Venegono Inferiore facility. Aermacchi has continued to seek customers for the type. In 2004, the company announced its intention to develop an improved version of the S-211, then referred to as the S-311, later as the M-345. At the time, Aermacchi was also developing the M-346 Master, which serves as a lead-in fighter trainer. While vaguely similar to the M-211, the M-346 is considerably larger and intended to perform both the basic and advanced training syllabus, as well tactical training functions, as an alternative to single-engined turboprop-powered competitors.

== Design ==
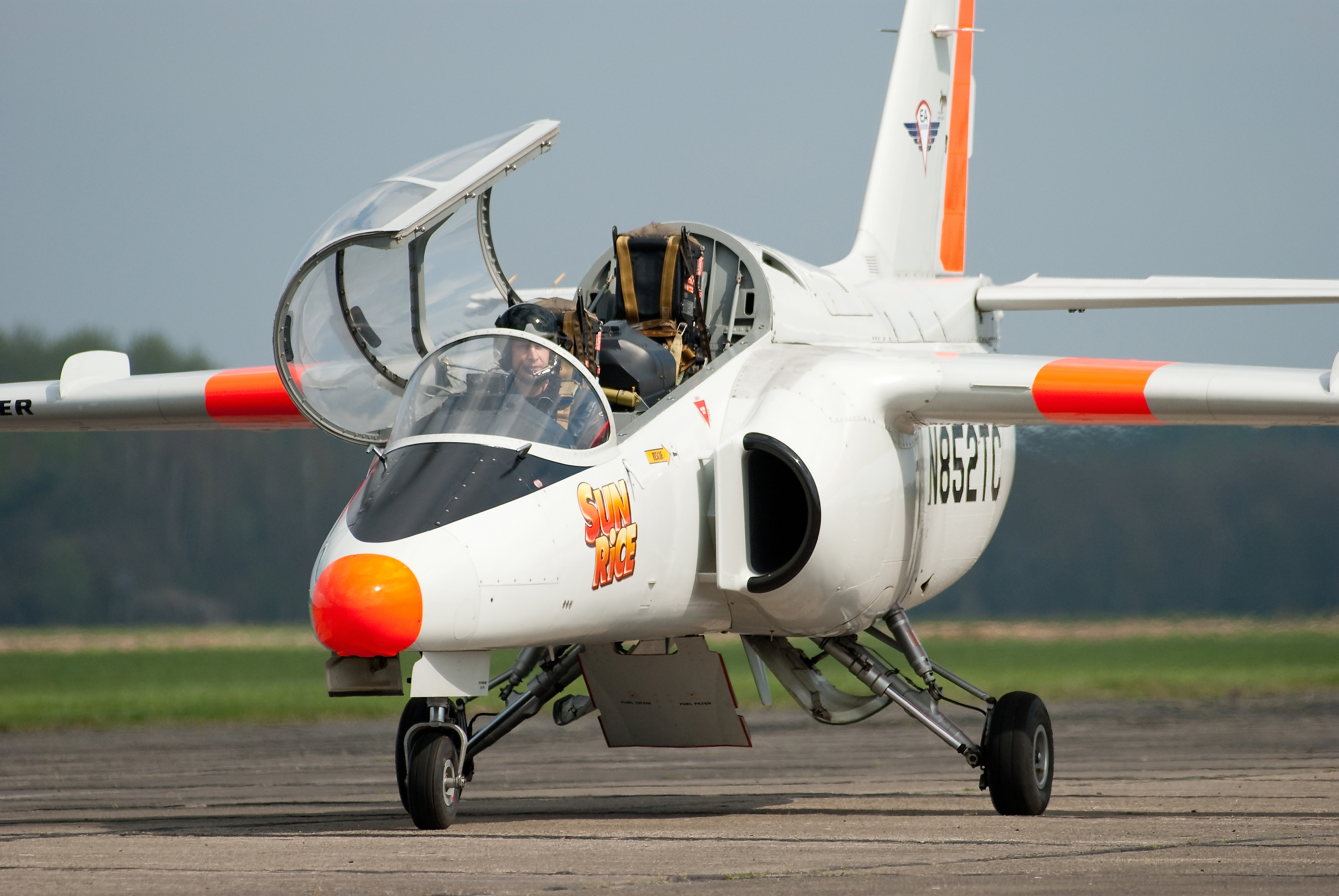
S-211 taxiing with an open cockpit

The S-211 is a compact two-seat shoulder-wing monoplane, possessing a full aerobatic capability. It is furnished with a retractable tricycle landing gear and is powered by a single Pratt & Whitney Canada JT15D-4C turbofan powerplant. The S-211 has been principally used as a basic trainer aircraft, the student and instructor being seated in a tandem arrangement. The front and rear cockpits are fully duplicated, the latter being elevated above the former to provide the occupant with improved forward visibility. The aircraft was designed to perform a secondary close air support (CAS) capability, being equipped with four underwing hard points, facilitating the carriage of various armaments and other external stores, including sensor apparatus and photographic equipment for undertaking aerial reconnaissance missions. Some models feature an additional hard point on the underside of the fuselage.

The airframe is largely composed of several composite materials, which includes Kevlar, Nomex and carbon fibre, while extensive use of structural bonding was made during construction. The flight controls feature manually operated push-pull rod primary controls. Many other systems, such as the air brake, landing gear, compressor, and boosted ailerons, are hydraulically-actuated at a nominal operating pressure of 200 bar (3,000 psi).

The electrical system consists of a 28V DC supply, powered by an engine-driven generator, an AC supply for instruments and avionics is provided via a pair of inverters. To facilitate engine start-up and accommodate emergency situations, the aircraft is outfitted with a nickel-cadmium battery unit. For greater crew comfort, an automatically adjusting environmental control system is installed. It uses a non-ozone-depleting vapour cycle for cooling, which is combined with bleed air drawn from the engine for heat and pressurisation alike.

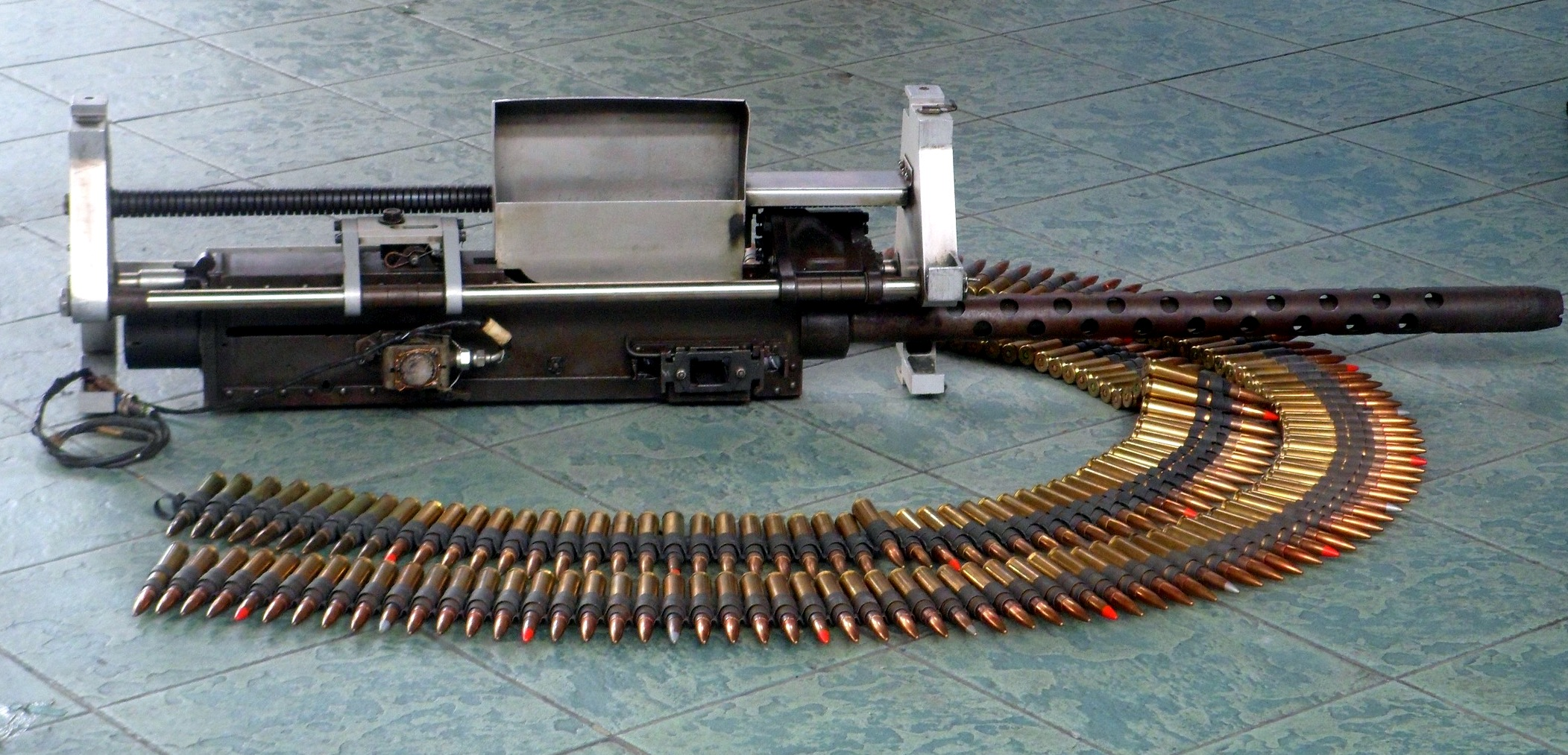
A M3 .50 cal machine gun

The avionics of the S-211 were designed to be customisable, allowing the manufacturer to accommodate a customer's various mission requirements. In a typical configuration, the aircraft would be provided a VHF/UHF communications suite, multiple navigation systems, such as an attitude and heading reference system (AHRS), horizontal situation indicator, automatic direction finding (ADF), VHF omnidirectional range and instrument landing system (VOR-ILS), a tactical air navigation system (TACAN) and identification friend or foe (IFF) transponder. Operators can choose to have their S-211s outfitted with modern glass cockpits.

The S-211's single JTI5D-4C engine provides a maximum thrust output of 11.12 kN (2,500 lbs) and a specific fuel consumption of 0.57 lb/h/lb. This powerplant facilitates a maximum speed of 414 knots at 25,000 ft and a rate of climb of 5,100 ft per minute. Fuel is housed internally within both the integral wing tank and a bladder cell within the fuselage, accommodating a combined 955 L (210 U.S. gal). For greater range, a maximum of two drop tanks can be installed upon the inner hard points of the wing, each having a capacity of 323 L (71 U.S. gal). Fuel is transferred between the various tanks and to the engine via a double-ended turbine pump. Ground refuelling involves a single fill point present on the wing, which is fed either by gravity flow or by an optionally installed pressurised refuelling system.

== Operational history ==
A Philippine Air Force S-211

The Philippine Air Force (PAF) first acquired a batch of 18 Units S.211s in 1988, which were delivered in 1989. Eventually, due to savings a second order for 6 units was made in 1992 as part of Second Residual purchase all aircraft were handed over by 1994. Since entering service the S-211 fleet has functioned both as a trainer and in offensive operations via secondary attack capability. These were redesignated as AS-211s and nicknamed as "Warriors". Following the retirement of the PAF's last Northrop F-5 fighters in 2005, the additional task of air defense has been assigned to its AS-211s. Because of this, the PAF initiated some improvements to the AS-211s to improve its combat capability through a series of programs and innovations.

The first program was called "Project Falcon", which installed the Norsight Optical Sight previously fitted to withdrawn F-5s into the AS-211. The program was initiated by Lieutenant Colonel Enrique Dela Cruz, the Group Commander of the 5th Tactical Fighter Group. This was followed by the "Project Falcon Uniform" program, which repainted the aircraft with a 2-tone light-and-dark ghost gray paint scheme along with low visibility markings, which reduces the aircraft's overall visibility.

The "Project Falcon Hear" program involved the optimizing of air-ground communications on the AS-211 by upgrading and installing the AN/ARC-34 UHF radios from the F-5A/B. These aircraft were fitted with a belly-mounted gun pod, which was designed, developed and manufactured by Philippine company Aerotech Industries Philippines, Inc. (AIPI). Each gun pod is equipped with an M3 .50 cal machine gun, an automatic charger and approximately 240 rounds of .50 cal ammunition.

In July 2022, the remaining S-211s are being used for training as the FA-50s are brought into service.

== Variants ==
S-211
Original production version with total of approximately sixty built. Was operated by the air forces of Haiti, Philippines and Singapore.
S-211A
Proposed version developed with input from Grumman for the JPATS (two prototypes, converted from two former Haitian S-211 aircraft).
AS-211
Served as trainers with secondary combat capability with the Philippine Air Force and were nicknamed as "Warriors". Starting in 2005, these aircraft were upgraded by fitting the Norsight Optical Sight and AN/ARC-34s from retired F-5s. It is also equipped with a .50 caliber belly gun pod made by Aerotech.
M-311
Modernized and uprated version announced by Aermacchi in 2004 (two prototypes built).

== Operators ==
=== Military operators ===
==== Current ====
Philippines

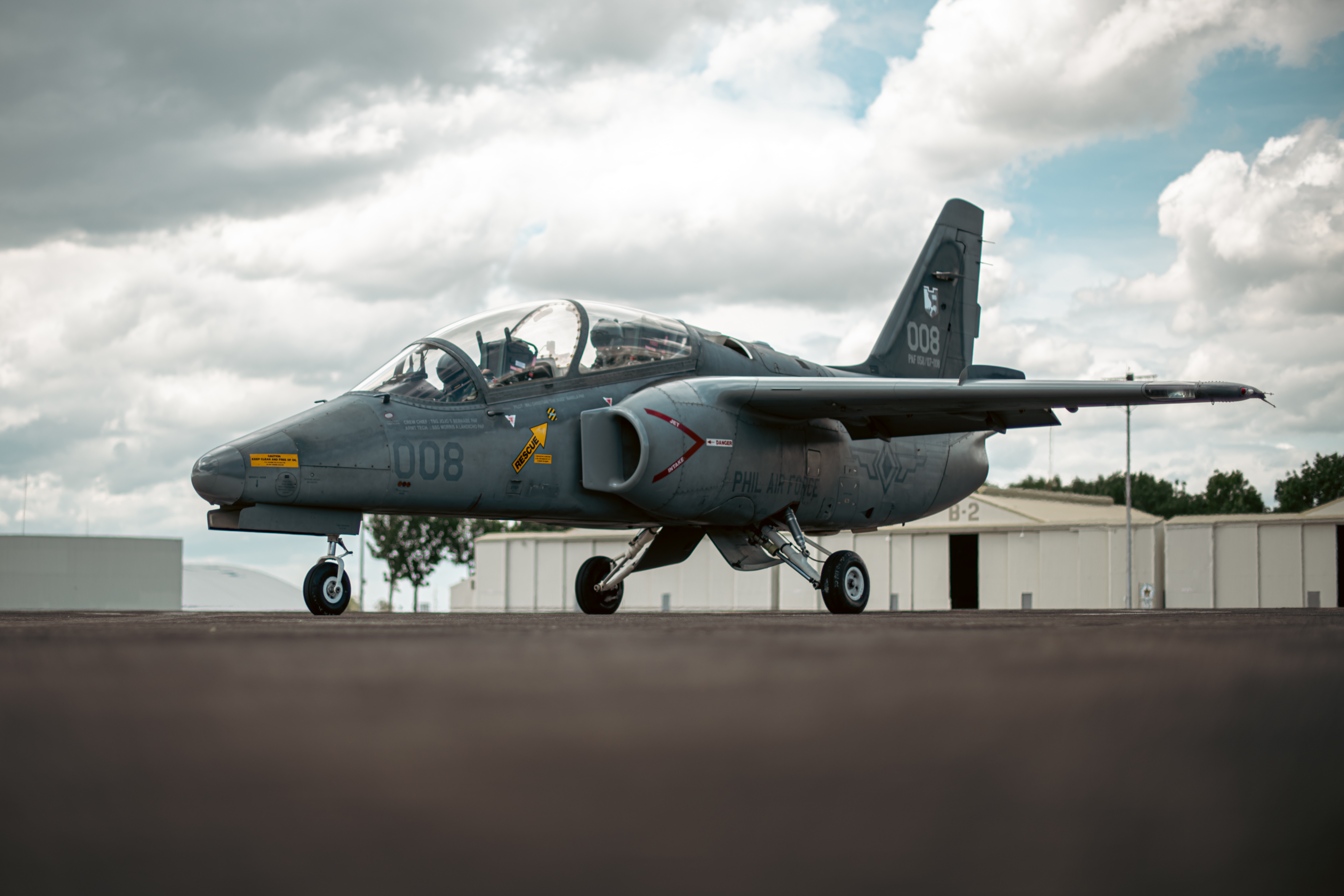
PAF AS.211 at Clark Air Base during Cope Thunder 2023

- Philippine Air Force (PAF) – 3 units active in 2024. 25 aircraft delivered, including one partially completed airframe for spare parts and 15 assembled locally by Philippine Aerospace Development Corporation. Due to accidents, 13 remain in inventory, 5 in active service as of September 2013 (Tail numbers 001,002,021,801 and 802). Another aircraft with tail number 008 is planned to be overhauled and brought back to service in 2014.
  - 105th Training Squadron "Blackjacks", 5th Fighter Wing
  - 7th Tactical Fighter Squadron "Bulldogs", replaced by KAI FA-50PH Fighting Eagle in 2015–2017.

==== Former ====
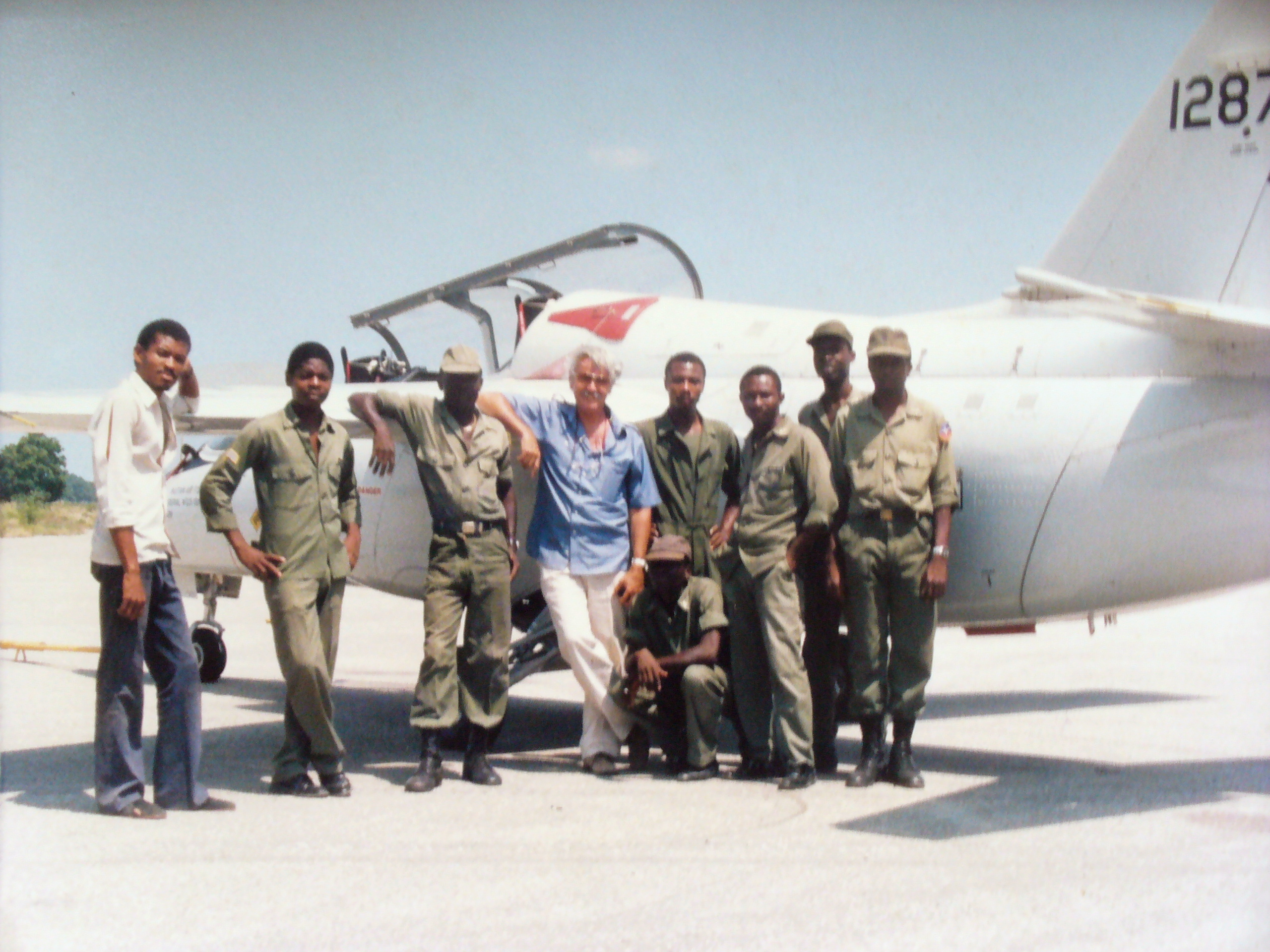
Lynn Garrison with Haitian Corps d’Aviation Marchetti and crew, September 1990

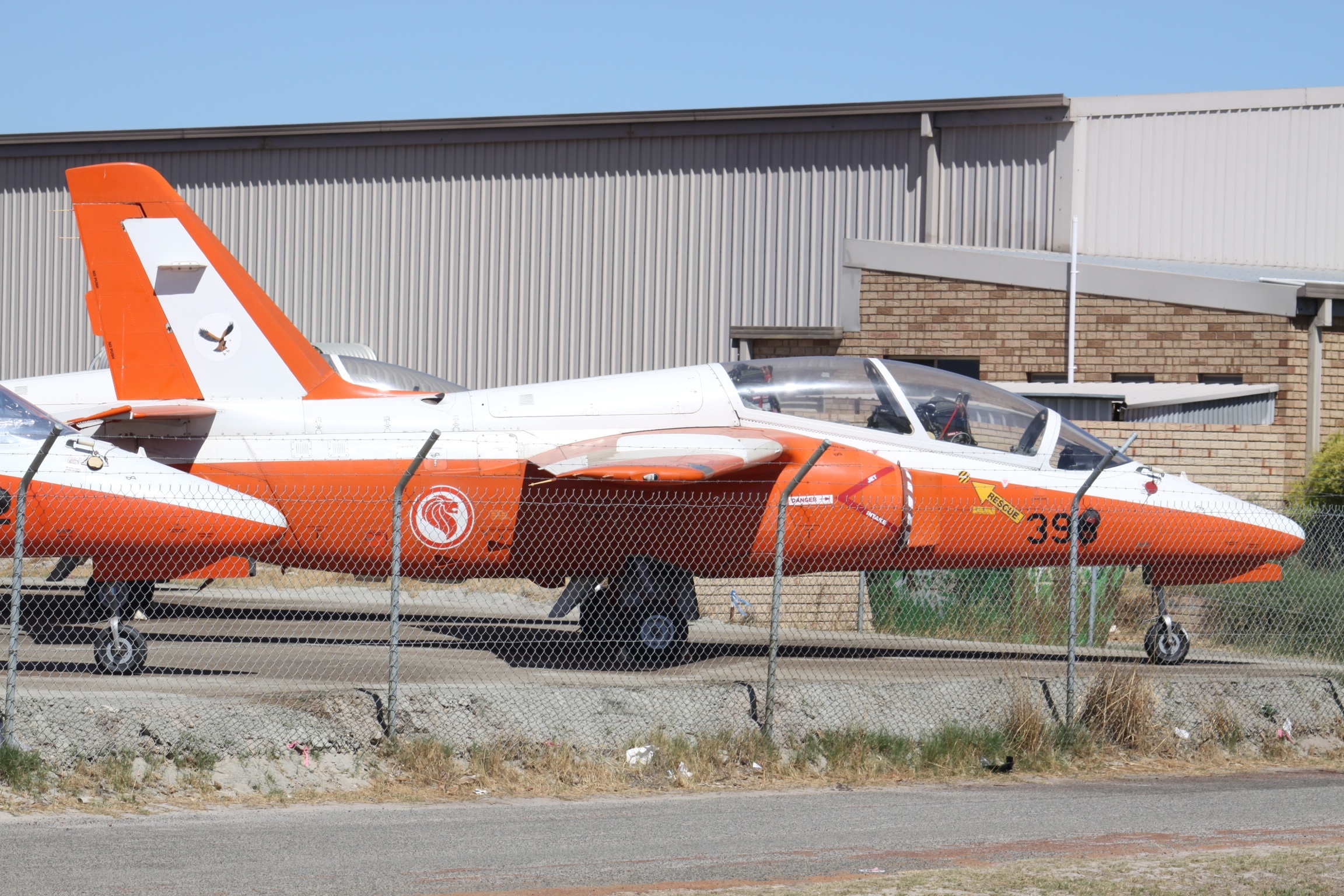
RSAF 130Sqn's S.211 (9V-398) in storage after being sold to International Air Parts (IAP) Group Australia

Haiti

- Haitian Air Force (HAF) – Four aircraft were delivered in June 1985, they were retired and put up for sale on 23 April 1990.

Singapore

- Republic of Singapore Air Force (RSAF) – total of 32 aircraft including 24 assembled locally by Singapore Aircraft Industries and two former Haitian aircraft were acquired as attrition replacements. The aircraft were based in, and flight training undertaken, in Australia.
  - 130 Squadron, Republic of Singapore Air Force – 25 airframes in operational use. 7 airframes were write-offs due to accidents. These were replaced by the Pilatus PC-21 from end 2008. After retirement, four were shipped back to Singapore being preserved for museum display and as educational/instructional airframes, while the remaining 21 airframes, including one airframe that had been used for spare parts, were sold off to International Air Parts (IAP) Group Australia Pty Ltd in 2009.
  - 131 Sqn – disbanded in 1996, following the move of RSAF Flight Training School to RAAF Base Pearce in Bullsbrook, Western Australia, all remaining aircraft transferred to the former.

=== Civilian operators ===
Australia

- 21 ex-RSAF S-211s were retired and sold to the IAP Group Australia in December 2009, including a cannibalised airframe. Fifteen have since been sold off and placed on the Australian civil registry.

United States

- Two second-hand aircraft (ex-Haitian AF) are operated by private companies.
- Aviation Performance Solutions uses S211 SIAI-Marchettis at their headquarters in Mesa, Arizona.

== Accidents and incidents ==
- On 14 January 2002, Philippine Air Force S-211 #017 crashed into houses inside the National Food Authority compound in Brgy. M.S.Garcia, Cabanatuan City, Nueva Ecija, due to mechanical problems after making several low passes over Cabanatuan during a contact proficiency flight from Basa AB. Both pilots and 3 civilians on the ground were killed.
- On 26 November 2007, Philippine Air Force S-211 #804 went missing after it failed to return to Palawan base after a security patrol and search mission over the disputed Kalayaan Islands in the south China sea, both pilots still missing and their fate remains unknown.
- On July 19, 2010, Philippine Air Force S-211 #024 crashed in Concepcion, Tarlac. The 2 pilots, Maj. Wilfredo Donato and 1Lt. Jose Wilbert Leonides Martinez, ejected and landed safely. The aircraft was reportedly low on fuel, which could have caused the crash.
- On 28 April 2011, Philippine Air Force S-211 #020 crashed in Bagac, Bataan, after making several aerobatic maneuvers over the shoreline during a contact proficiency flight from Clark Air Base. Investigators later found out that the aircraft entered into a high-G recovery maneuver from a loop that caused the engine to go into a high-G stall and crashed less than a hundred meters from the shoreline with no survivors.

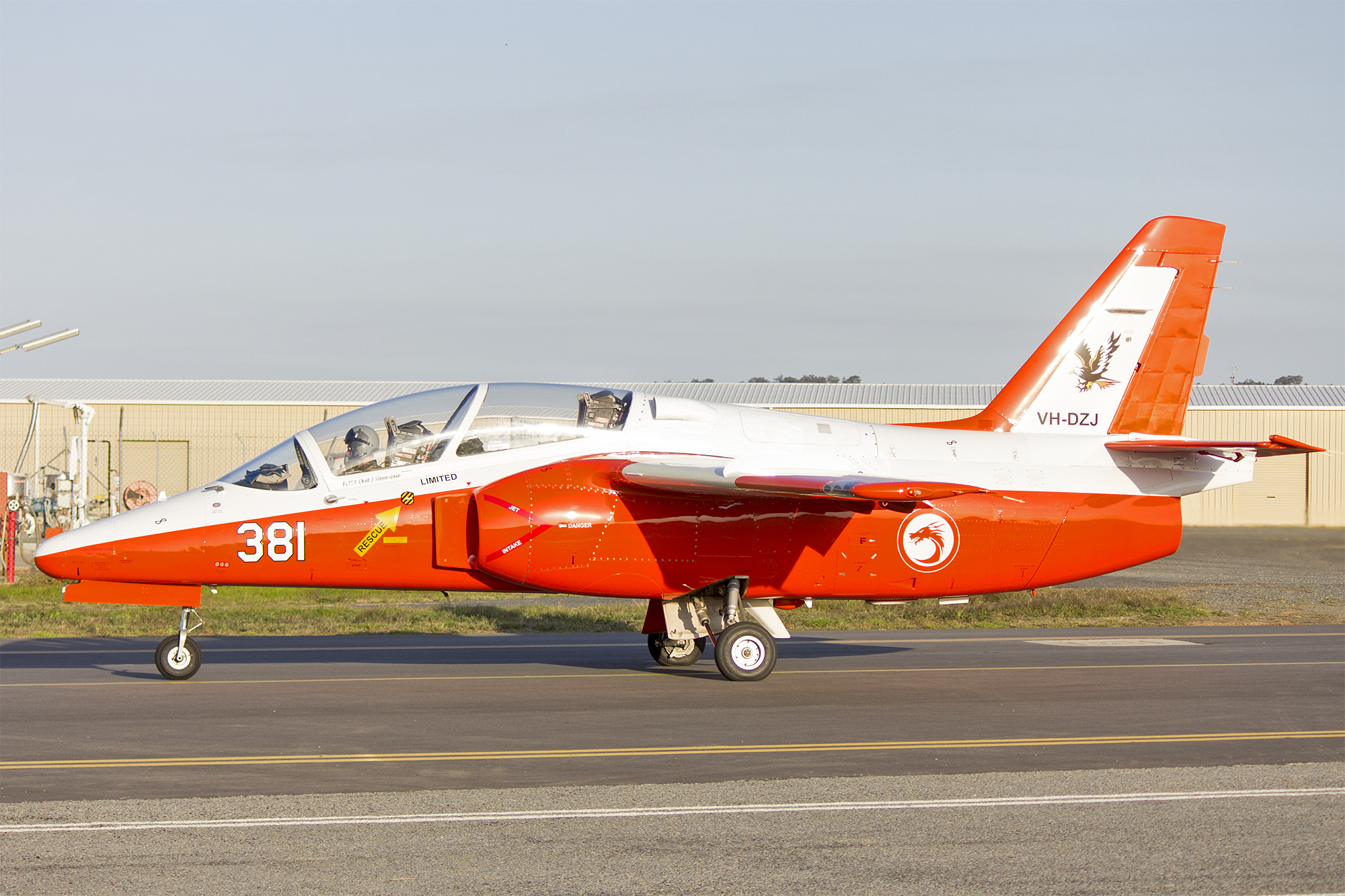
Photo of VH-DZJ, accident aircraft

- On 19 November 2023, two civilian registered, VH-DQJ and VH-DZJ, S-211 aircraft collided mid-air above Port Phillip Bay, 12 kilometres (7.5 mi) offshore from Mount Martha in Victoria, Australia. One aircraft (VH-DQJ) safely landed at Essendon Airport, while the other aircraft crashed into the water in Port Phillip. On 21 November, TV presenter Charley Boorman identified the two persons on board, one a photographer with whom he had worked; and, police announced that the main part of the crashed aircraft had been found in Port Phillip Bay.

== Aircraft on display ==
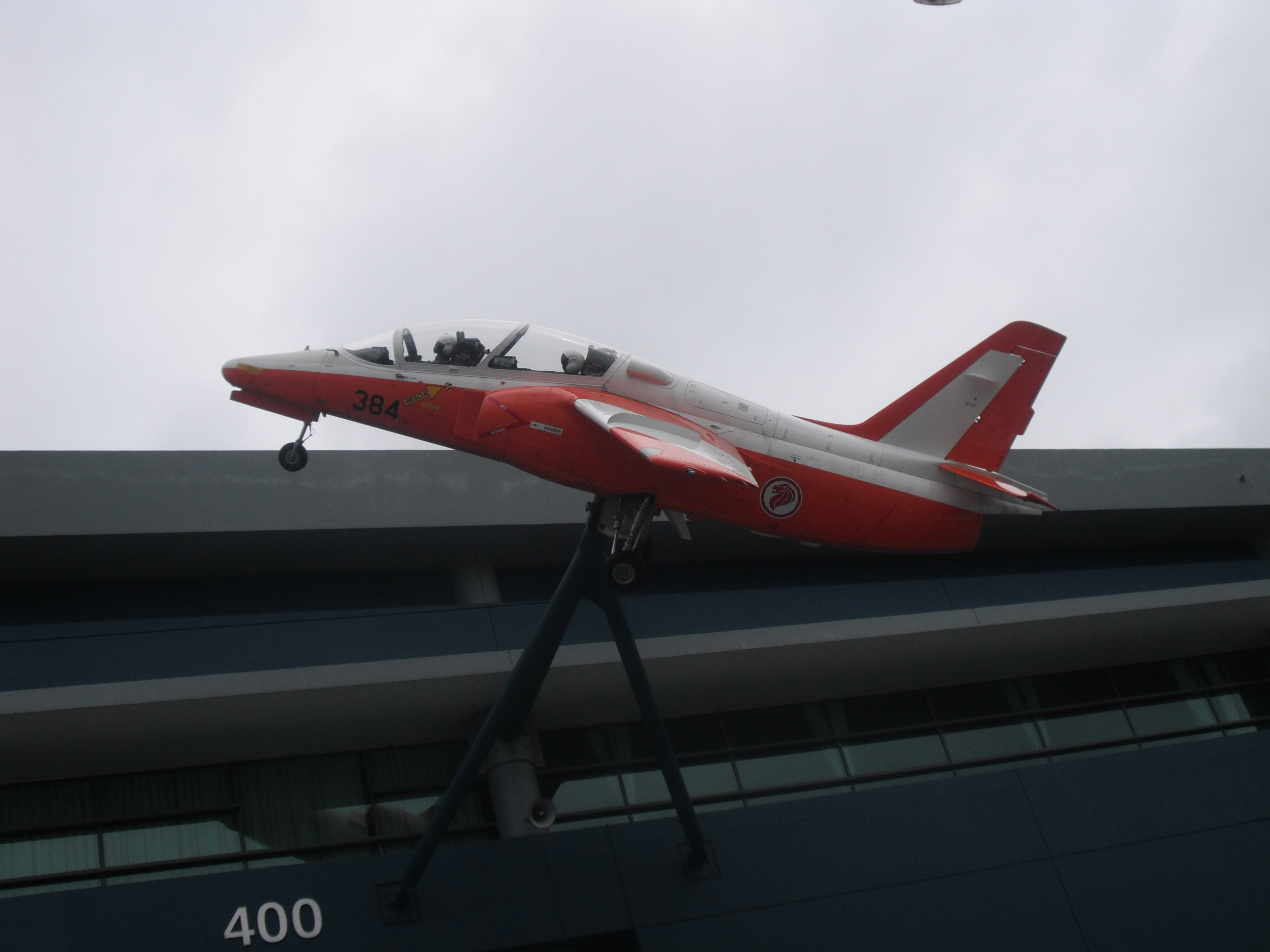
After retirement, 9V-384 was preserved as a gate guard at the Singapore Air Force Museum.

=== Italy ===
- S-211 ('I-SITF', s/n 001) - first prototype, in white/green colour scheme. Parked outdoors at Volandia Museum, Malpensa, Italy.
- S-211 ('I-SIJF', s/n 002) - second prototype, in brown/tan colour scheme. Parked indoors at Volandia Museum, Malpensa, Italy.
- S-211 ('I-TFSI', s/n 003) is displayed outdoors in a light grey livery at the Piana delle Orme museum, Latina, Italy.
- S-211 ('I-SMTE', s/n 021) - in blue/white colour scheme, with JPATS titles. On a pole as gate guard at Volandia Museum parking, Malpensa, Italy.

=== Philippines ===
- S-211 (s/n 022)is displayed outdoors in Project Falcon Uniform livery at Air Power Park, Philippine Military Academy, Baguio City, Philippines.
- S-211 (s/n 814)is displayed outdoors Project Falcon Uniform livery at Barangay 183 Pasay City near Ninoy Aquino International Airport

Terminal 3.

- S-211 (s/n 001)is displayed outdoors Project Falcon Uniform livery at 5th Fighter wing Headquarters at Cesar Basa Air Base, Floridablanca, Pampanga, Philippines.
- S-211 (s/n 011 )is displayed outdoors in Red Aces Livery at 430th AMG Maintenance complex at Cesar Basa Air Base, Floridablanca, Pampanga, Philippines.

=== Singapore ===
- S-211 (9V-341), instructional airframe at Temasek Polytechnic.
- S-211 (9V-343), instructional airframe at ITE College Central (Ang Mo Kio campus).
- S-211 (9V-383), instructional airframe at Paya Lebar Air Base.
- S-211 (9V-384), gate guard at Singapore Air Force Museum.

== Specifications (S-211) ==
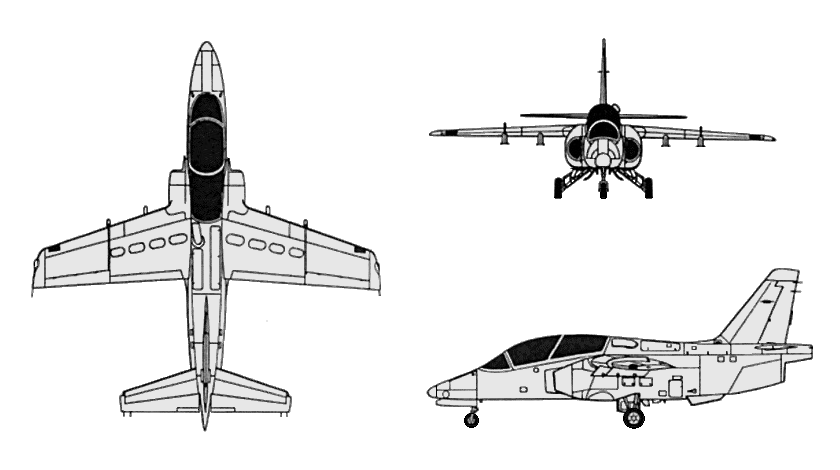

Data from Jane's All the World's Aircraft 1988–89

General characteristics

- Crew: 2
- Length: 9.31 m (30 ft 7 in)
- Wingspan: 8.43 m (27 ft 8 in)
- Height: 3.8 m (12 ft 6 in)
- Wing area: 12.6 m^{2} (136 sq ft)
- Aspect ratio: 5.64
- Airfoil: root: NYU/KU 15%; tip: NYU/KU 13%
- Empty weight: 1,850 kg (4,079 lb)
- Max takeoff weight: 2,750 kg (6,063 lb) (trainer, clean)

3,150 kg (6,940 lb) (armed version)

- Fuel capacity: 800 L (210 US gal; 180 imp gal) internal with provision for 540 L (140 US gal; 120 imp gal) in two underwing drop tanks
- Powerplant: 1 × Pratt & Whitney Canada JT15D-4D 11.12 kN turbofan, 11.12 kN (2,500 lbf) thrust

Performance

- Maximum speed: Mach 0.8
- Cruise speed: 667 km/h (414 mph, 360 kn) maximum at 7,620 m (25,000 ft)
- Stall speed: 138 km/h (86 mph, 75 kn) flaps down
- Never exceed speed: 740 km/h (460 mph, 400 kn)
- Range: 1,668 km (1,036 mi, 901 nmi) maximum on internals with 30 minutes reserve fuel
- Ferry range: 2,483 km (1,543 mi, 1,341 nmi) with max internal and external fuel, at 3,150 kg (6,940 lb) at 500 km/h (310 mph; 270 kn) at 9,150 m (30,020 ft)
- Endurance: 3 hours 50 minutes with 30 minutes fuel reserve
- Service ceiling: 12,200 m (40,000 ft)
- g limits: +6 -3 clean; +5 -2.5 with external stores

maximum sustained load at 4,575 m (15,010 ft): 3.4g

- Rate of climb: 21 m/s (4,100 ft/min)
- Time to altitude: 6,100 m (20,000 ft) in 6 minutes 12 seconds
- Take-off run: 390 m (1,280 ft) ISA at sea level
- Landing run: 361 m (1,184 ft) ISA at sea level
- Take-off run to 15 m (49 ft): 512 m (1,680 ft)
- Landing run from 15 m (49 ft): 705 m (2,313 ft)

Armament

- Guns: gun pods
- Hardpoints: 4 with a capacity of 660 kg (1,460 lb) maximum
- Rockets: rocket launchers (such as the SNEB 68 mm rocket pods
- Bombs: unguided bombs

Avionics
Standard avionic fits for comms and navigation

== See also ==
Related development

- Aermacchi M-345

Aircraft of comparable role, configuration, and era

- Aero L-39 Albatros
- CASA C-101
- Dassault/Dornier Alpha Jet
- FMA IA 63 Pampa
- Mitsubishi T-2
