= Singapore Air Force Museum =

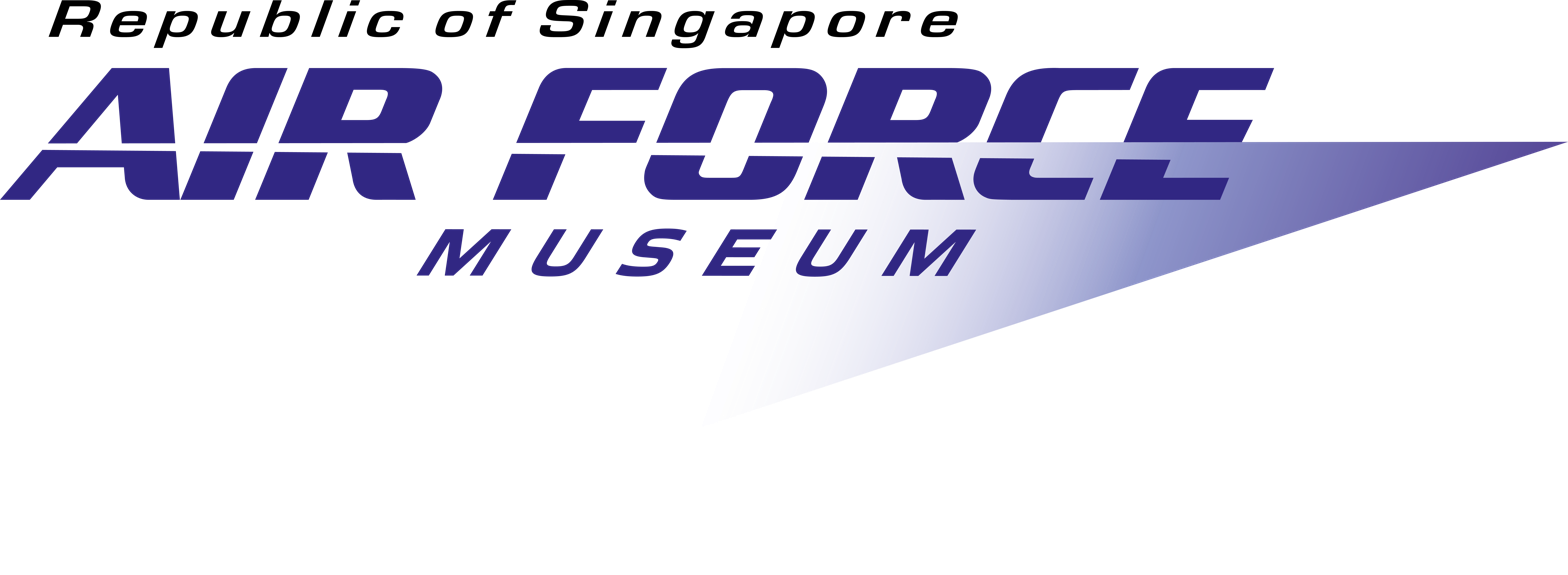

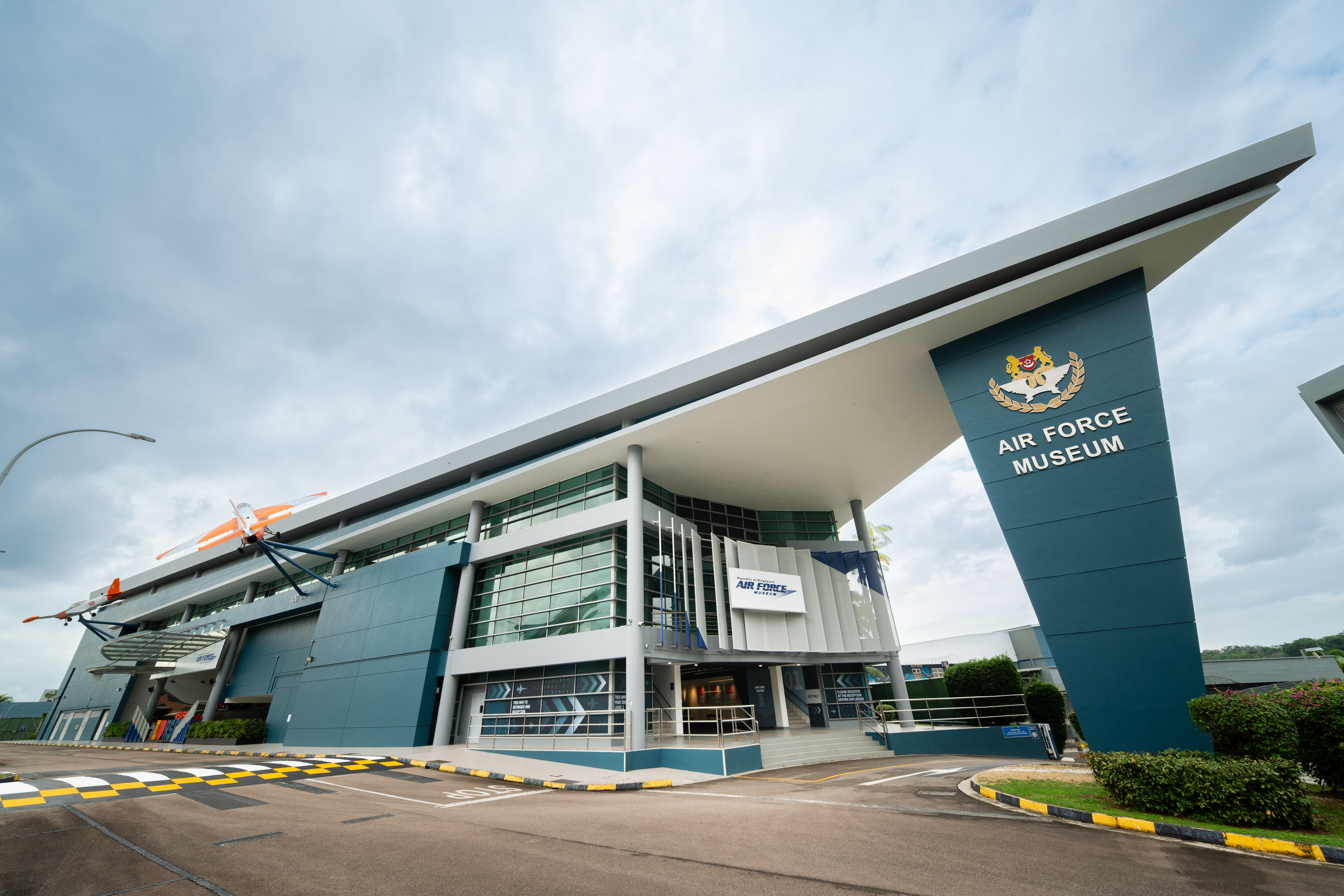
- External facade of RSAF Museum (post-2025 to 2026 renovation)
- Location: Paya Lebar, Singapore
- Coordinates: 1.3467°N 103.8995°E
- Type: Aviation museum
- Website: https://www.defencecollectivesg.com/singapore-air-force-museum

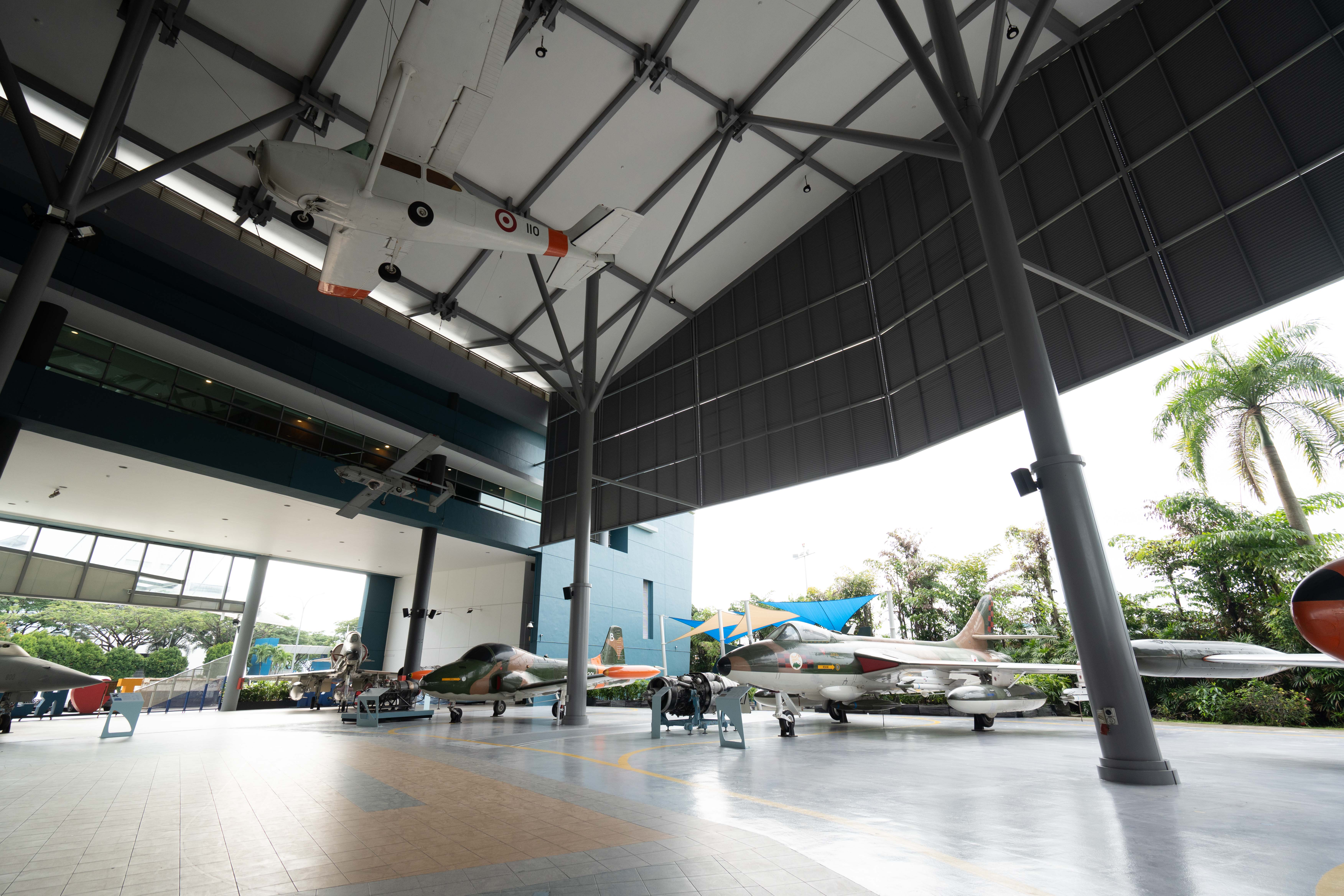
Aircraft on display at Level 1

The Singapore Air Force Museum (also known as the Republic of Singapore Air Force Museum or simply the Air Force Museum) is located at 400 Airport Road, Singapore, adjacent to Paya Lebar Air Base.

The museum is open from 10:00 to 17:00 daily, except on Wednesdays.

== History ==
The Air Force Museum was opened on 1 September 1988 at Changi Air Base. It was moved to a compound next to Paya Lebar Air Base and combined original artefacts with interactive media. It includes an indoor exhibition, a gift shop and both indoor and outdoor static aircraft displays.

It was renovated in 2015 to update the changes in the restructuring of the airforce and underwent a renovation starting from September 2025, which was completed in June 2026. Following this renovation, when the museum re-opened on 17 June 2026, it began charging admission ranging from $5 to $8 for foreign visitors who are not foreign military personnel.

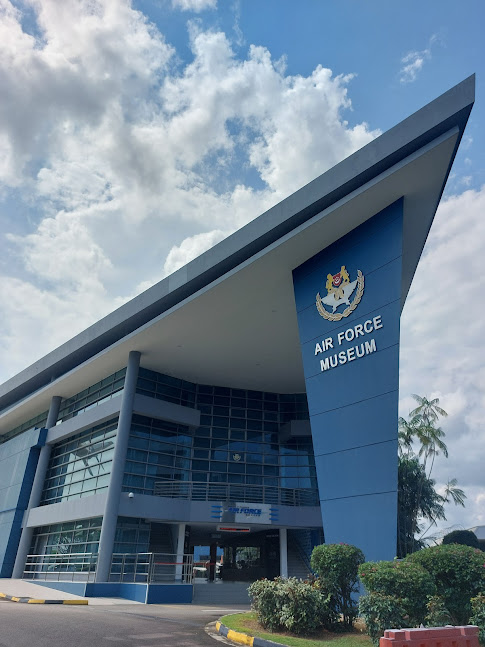
External facade of RSAF Museum (pre-2025 renovation)

== Aircraft on display ==
- Bell UH-1H Iroquois (2)
- BAC Strikemaster 84
- Cessna 172K
- Douglas A-4S Skyhawk
- Douglas A-4SU Skyhawk
- Douglas TA-4S Skyhawk (front fuselage)
- Douglas TA-4SU Skyhawk
- Eurocopter Fennec
- Grumman E-2C Hawkeye
- AS332 Super Puma
- Hawker Hunter F.6 (2)
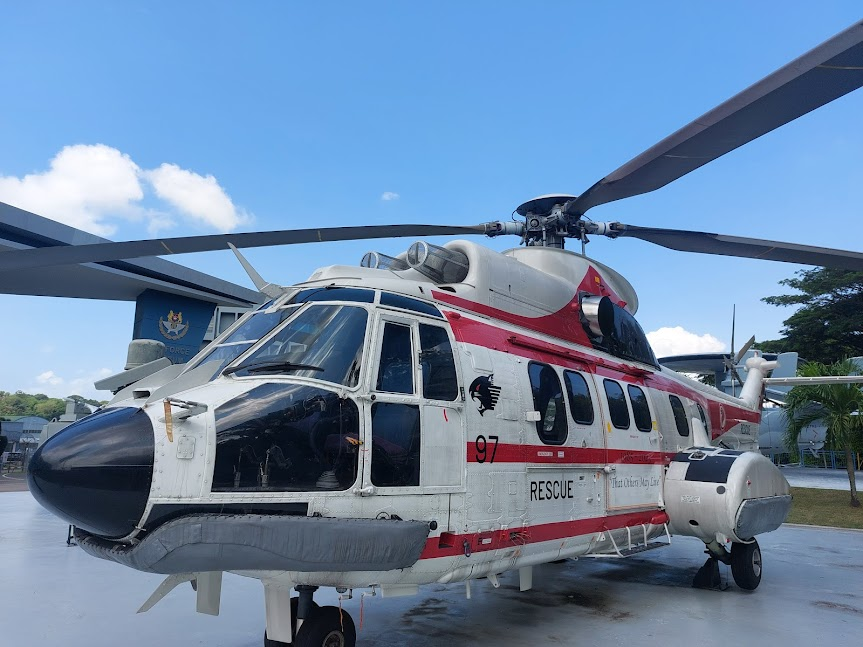
  Medical AS332 Super Puma static display added to RSAF museum in 2024
- Lockheed T-33A
- Northrop F-5S Freedom Fighter
- SIAI-Marchetti S.211
- SIAI-Marchetti SF.260MS
- Sud Aviation S.3160 Alouette III
Gallery

== See also ==
- List of aviation museums
