= Aermacchi M-345 =

Military training aircraft

M-345
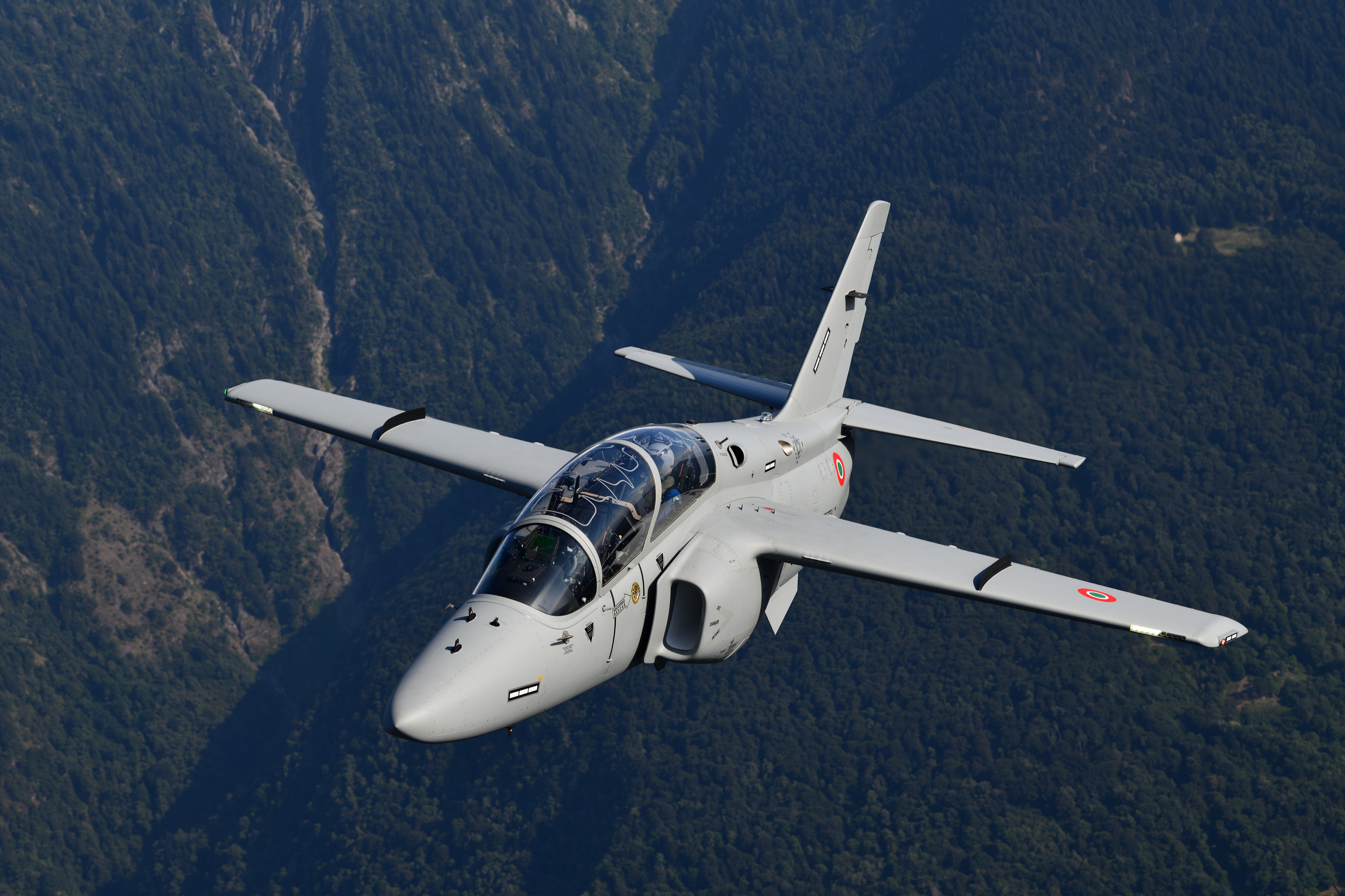
- A production Aermacchi M-345 trainer aircraft

General information
- Type: Basic/advanced trainer and light attack aircraft
- National origin: Italy
- Manufacturer: Leonardo S.p.A. (ex Alenia Aermacchi)
- Status: In active service
- Primary user: Italian Air Force
- Number built: 4

History
- First flight: 29 December 2016 (M-345 prototype); 21 December 2018 (M-345 production aircraft)
- Developed from: SIAI-Marchetti S.211

The Aermacchi M-345 is a turbofan-powered military trainer aircraft designed and produced by the Italian defense conglomerate Leonardo S.p.A.

It is an improvement of the Aermacchi M-311 which in itself was a development of the SIAI-Marchetti S.211. On 29 December 2016, the M-345 performed its maiden flight; one month later, the first order for the type was placed by the Italian Air Force. The first production-standard M-345 was flown from Venegono Superiore in December 2018; and entered service in December 2020 replacing MB-339.

== Development ==
=== Origins ===
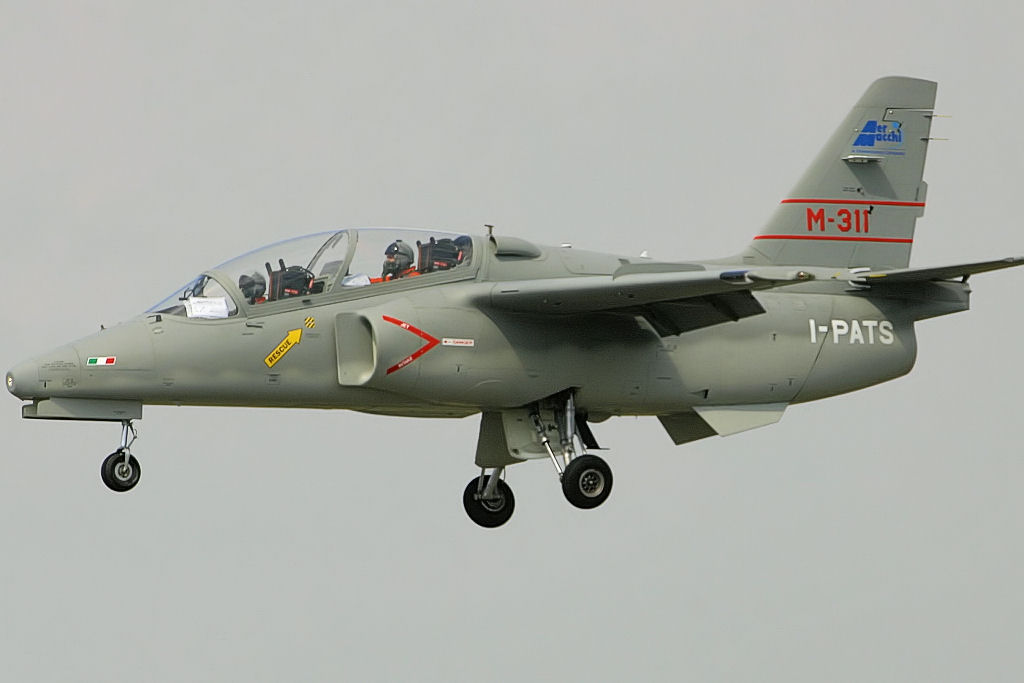
M-311 in 2005

During 1997, Italian aircraft manufacturer Aermacchi acquired SIAI-Marchetti; this purchase included the rights to the latter's S.211, a jet-powered trainer aircraft. In 2004, the company announced its intention to develop an improved version of the S.211, then referred to as the M-311. At the time, Aermacchi was also developing the M-346 Master, which serves as a lead-in fighter trainer; considerably smaller than the M-346, the M-311 was intended to perform both the basic and advanced training syllabus, as well as tactical training functions, as an alternative to single-engined turboprop-powered competitors.

Being based on the S.211, the M-311 featured an advanced new cockpit, various structural enhancements (including the increased use of composite materials) and a new powerplant in the form of the Pratt & Whitney Canada JT15D-5C turbofan engine. The changes allowed for an extended fatigue life of 15,000 flight hours, increased intervals between overhauls and a reduced turnaround time between sorties. According to the manufacturer, the M-311's life-cycle costs could be brought into line with those of its turboprop rivals, the direct operating cost is only 5% higher despite a fuel-burn penalty of roughly 30%. Aermacchi's competitive analysis director Sergio Coniglio stated low maintenance costs shall be a decisive factor in the M-311's competitiveness against increasingly sophisticated competition.

On 1 June 2005, the first prototype aircraft conducted its maiden flight. A second aircraft, which had previously been used as a technology demonstrator during the 1990s, incorporating most features of the envisioned production model, was also produced. By September of that year, the prototype had reportedly flown 30 flights, and was set to receive software upgrades to enhance its cockpit displays. During July 2006, one of the prototypes was displayed at the Royal International Air Tattoo.

During mid-2006, the company announced that it had forecast demand for a production run of up to 350 M-311s by 2030. On 28 May 2008, Boeing and Alenia signed a joint agreement to cooperate on marketing, sales, training and product support for both the M-346 and M-311.

=== Relaunch ===
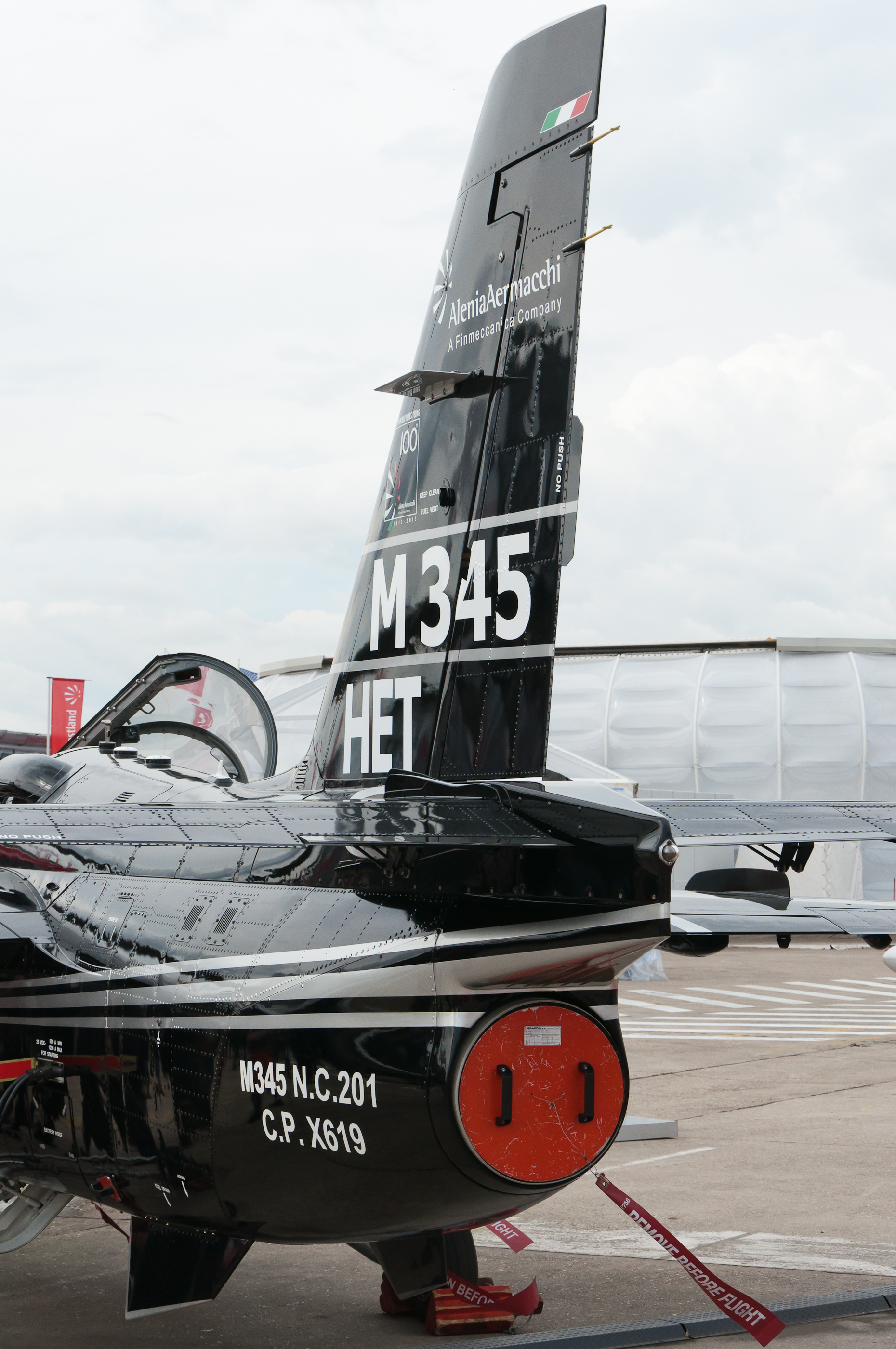
M-345 at the 2013 Paris Air Show

During 2012, the M-311 was revised, updated and re-designated by Alenia Aermacchi as the M-345 HET (High Efficiency Trainer). During October 2014, it was announced that the Williams International FJ44-4M turbofan engine had been selected to power the in-development trainer, having overcome rivaling bids from both Honeywell and Pratt & Whitney. The company stated that Williams' engine has been selected due to its performance in the business aviation sector and with the Swedish Air Force's re-engined fleet of Saab 105 trainers. Shortly thereafter, Alenia Aermacchi began installing the 3,400 lb-thrust FJ44-4M onto its flight-test aircraft, replacing the existing P&W Canada JT15D units.

In March 2015, Alenia and ENAER of Chile signed a memorandum of understanding, to explore the possibility of jointly manufacture and sell the M-345 HET in South America. On 1 June 2015, Alenia Aermacchi presented the M-345 to the DGA for the nascent French replacement program for its Dassault/Dornier Alpha Jets. On 20 September 2018, Alenia Aermacchi signed a memorandum of understanding with South African defense company Paramount Group to evaluate and develop a combat-orientated model of the M-345 to suit the requirements of prospective African customers.

The M-345 first flew on 29 December 2016. The first production-standard M-345 was flown from Venegono Superiore in December 2018; at this point, service entry with the Italian Air Force was anticipated to occur during 2020. In December 2020, into entered service.

=== Service ===
In December 2020 the first of 2 M-345 were accepted into service with the Italian Air Force, the first of the total order. At least 18 are on order, although the Air Force anticipates acquiring at least 45. The M-345 are replacing 137 MB-339 which entered service in the early 1980s.

== Design ==
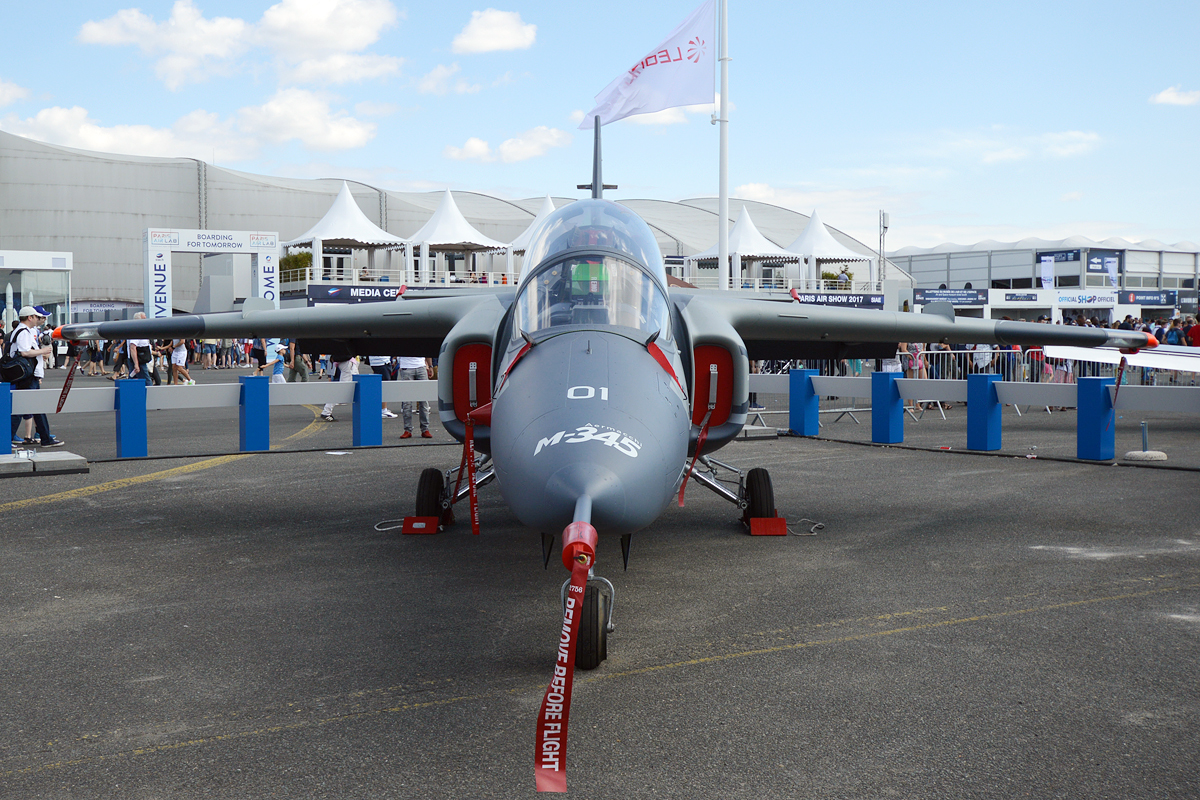
Head-on view of the M-345

The Aermacchi M-345 is a compact twin-seat shoulder-wing monoplane trainer aircraft. It is based on the earlier S.211 and features structural and equipment improvements, and new systems. The airframe has been strengthened, while a glass cockpit and modern avionics have been installed. It is furnished with a retractable tricycle landing gear, powered by a single Williams FJ44-4M-34 turbofan engine. As a basic trainer, the M-345 is designed to complement the Aermacchi M-346 advanced jet trainer. It has been designed with a secondary close air support capability, being furnished with four underwing hard points.

Both the pilot and instructor, which are seated in a tandem configuration, are provided with Hands-On-Throttle-And-Stick (HOTAS) controls. Both crew are seated upon Martin-Baker-built Mk.IT16D 'zero-zero' ejection seats. The cockpit's internal dimensions have been increased to be broadly identical to those of the BAE Systems Hawk. The displays and all light sources have been selected for compatibility with night-vision goggles (NVG). The environmental control system cools the cockpit for ground operations in temperatures up to ISA +35 °C (95 °F); the presence of an On-Board Oxygen-Generation System (OBOGS) removes the need for oxygen bottles.

The M-345's glass cockpit features various avionics and last generation Human-Machine Interface. Displays include three identical 5 x 7in (125 x 180mm) colour Multi-Function liquid-crystal Displays (MFD), a forward-mounted wide-angle Head-Up Display (HUD), while the rear position is provided with a full-sized HUD repeater via a fourth dedicated multifunction display. The integrated avionics suite includes dual mission computers, embedded Global Positioning System/inertial navigation system and Radar Altimeter (EGIR), two V/UHF radios, integrated central Audio Warning, IFF Transponder, Traffic Alert System (TAS), Traffic Collision Avoidance System (TCAS) and, optionally, a digital moving map, stores management system, and an embedded simulation capability (Embedded Tactical Training System - ETTS - identical to that offered on the M-346). The latter is able to simulate a tactical scenario with threats and targets, presence of realistic Computer Generated Forces (CGF), on-board sensors (multimode Fore Control Radar, targeting pod and active/passive electronic countermeasures), weapons.

Conventional ailerons are hydraulically boosted, with provisions for manual reversion, while both the elevator and rudder are mechanically actuated via pushrods, with three-axis electrical trimming. Secondary flight controls are simple trailing edge flaps, which are electrically actuated, and a belly-mounted air brake, which is electrically controlled and hydraulically actuated. The 207bar (3,000 lb/in2) hydraulic system is used to operate the landing gear, wheel brakes, air brake and aileron boost; the electrical system is DC with internal-battery engine start. The M-345 is suited for a two level maintenance concept, organizational and intermediate, for aircraft, equipment and system, whilst an on-board Health and Usage Monitoring System (HUMS) enables data collection and monitoring, contributing to the long life of the airframe and simplifying maintenance activities.

== Operational history ==
During January 2017, Italy placed an initial order for five M-345s for the Italian Air Force (IAF). The service has a requirement for up to 45 aircraft to replace Aermacchi MB-339s used in both the basic training role and by the Frecce Tricolori aerobatic team. In June 2019, Italy placed a follow-on order for an additional 13 M-345s, bringing the total up to 18.

In May 2020, the M-345 achieved its initial military certification. During January 2021, the IAF inducted its first pair of M-345 trainers; the type will replace the MB-339A as the service's second and third phases of its pilot training programme. In December 2020, the M-345 entered service, replacing Aermacchi MB-339 and supplementing MB-346 Master. The M-345 was initially the planned replacement of the MB-339PAN used by the Frecce Tricolori, however in 2024 this decision was reverted with the announcement that the aerobatic team would instead receive the larger, higher performance, twin-engine M-346, as the M-345 was judged not suitable for the large formation aerobatic flight of the Frecce Tricolori.

In 2022, 61° Stormo which was established over 75 years prior operating from Lecce-Galatina Air Base, operates M-345, MB-339A/CD and M-346s supports flight training for international flight school. The T-345A officially entered service with the Italian Air Force in June 2025, with a ceremony marking the formal introduction of the M-345 and the phase-out of the MB-339A it replaces in the trainer role.

== Variants ==
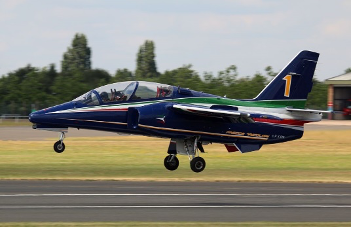
Alenia Aermacchi M-311 at Paris Air Show 2013

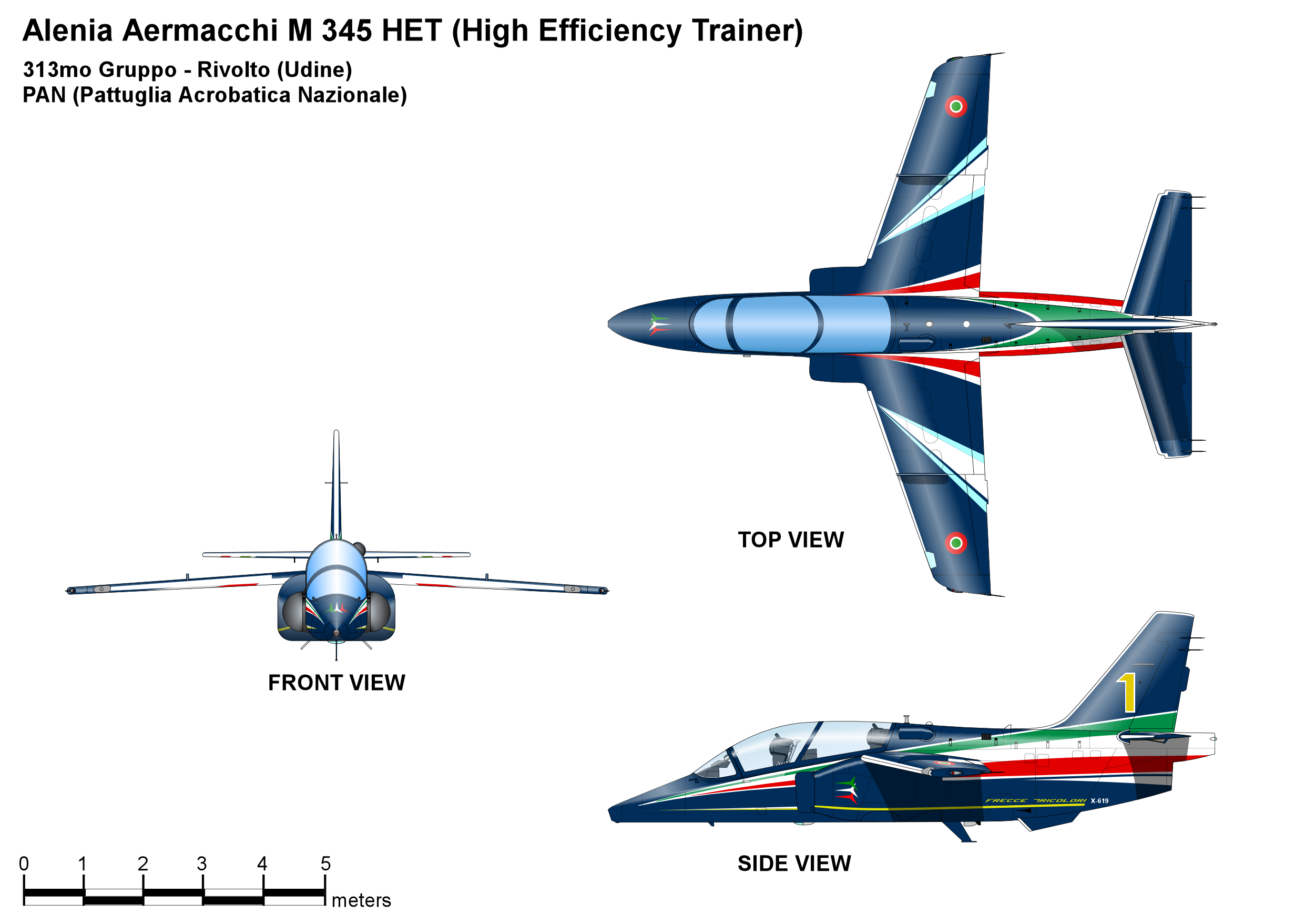
M-345 For Italian Acrobatic Team "Frecce Tricolori"

M-311
Modernized and uprated version of the SIAI-Marchetti S.211, powered by a Pratt & Whitney Canada JT15D-5C turbofan engine. Two prototypes built.
M-345
Redesignation of the M-311 from 2012, powered by a Williams International FJ44-4M turbofan engine.
T-345A
Italian military designation for the M-345.

== Operators ==
Italy

- Italian Air Force

== Specifications (M-345) ==
Data from M-345 - Leonardo Company

General characteristics

- Crew: 2
- Length: 9.85 m (32 ft 4 in)
- Wingspan: 8.47 m (27 ft 9 in)
- Height: 3.74 m (12 ft 3 in)
- Wing area: 12.6 m^{2} (136 sq ft)
- Empty weight: 3,300 kg (7,275 lb)
- Max takeoff weight: 4,500 kg (9,921 lb)
- Fuel capacity: 700 kg (1,500 lb)
- Powerplant: 1 × Williams FJ44-4M-34 turbofan engine, 15.40 kN (3,460 lbf) thrust with 1,540 kg (3,400 lb) Max Thrust

Performance

- Maximum speed: 740 km/h (460 mph, 400 kn)
- Stall speed: 170 km/h (110 mph, 92 kn)
- Never exceed speed: 795 km/h (494 mph, 429 kn)
- Range: 1,410 km (880 mi, 760 nmi)
- Service ceiling: 12,190 m (39,990 ft)
- g limits: +7.0/−3.5
- Rate of climb: 23.97 m/s (4,719 ft/min)
- Thrust/weight: 0.45

Armament

- More than 1,000 kg (2,200 lb) of weapons on four hardpoints, including gunpods, bombs, and rockets, with the capability to employ IR guided air-to-air missiles.

== See also ==
Related development

- SIAI-Marchetti S.211

Aircraft of comparable role, configuration, and era

- Aero L-39NG
- HAL HJT-36 Sitara
- Hongdu JL-8
- IAR 99
- Kawasaki T-4
- KB SAT SR-10

== Sources ==
- Niccoli, Ricardo (December 2006). "Italy's 21st Century Trainer - The Alenia Aermacchi M-311". Air International. Vol. 71, no. 6. pp. 32–37. ISSN 0306-5634.
- Niccoli, Ricardo (July 2017). "High Efficiency Trainer". Air International. Vol. 93, no. 1. pp. 8–11. ISSN 0306-5634.
