= Aviation Performance Solutions =

Location
- Mesa, Arizona

Information
- Type: Aviation school
- Established: 2005
- President: Paul Weston Ransbury
- Website: http://apstraining.com/

Aviation Performance Solutions is an aviation training company based in Mesa, Arizona. APS trains and instructs pilots of all experience levels in Upset Prevention and Recovery Training (UPRT).

== History ==
In 2005, APS was founded, with a specific focus on advancing Upset Prevention and Recovery Training (UPRT) for all pilots. APS team members participated in shaping global UPRT recommendations by the International Civil Aviation Organization (ICAO) in 2014.

APS's strategic partners include CAE, Inc. (and its military division CAE USA), Swiss Re, USAIG.

== Programs and courses ==
According to Flying magazine, "APS provides training on Loss of Control In-flight (LOC-I), as well as recovery concepts and techniques".

=== Upset Prevention and Recovery Training (UPRT) ===
APS is known for their approach to UPRT that includes the combination of computer-based, on-aircraft, and full-flight simulator training platforms, which reduce the risk of Loss of Control In-flight (LOC-I) through flight training. Their live on-aircraft training platforms include the Marchetti S211 piston Extra 300L.

== Locations ==
APS is headquartered at the Phoenix-Mesa Gateway Airport (KIWA) in Mesa, Arizona. In 2012, APS Europe was established, based in the Breda International Airport in the Netherlands. In 2013, APS opened a facility in Arlington, Texas in the Arlington Municipal Airport. APS Texas training services include the integration of simulators located at the CAE Dallas training center, which is in the Fort Worth International Airport.

In early 2017, APS opened its first military UPRT location in Dothan, Alabama in partnership with CAE USA.
