= Paya Lebar Air Base =

Military airbase in Singapore

Paya Lebar Airbase
- Lapangan Terbang Paya Lebar
- Paya Lebar, Singapore in Singapore
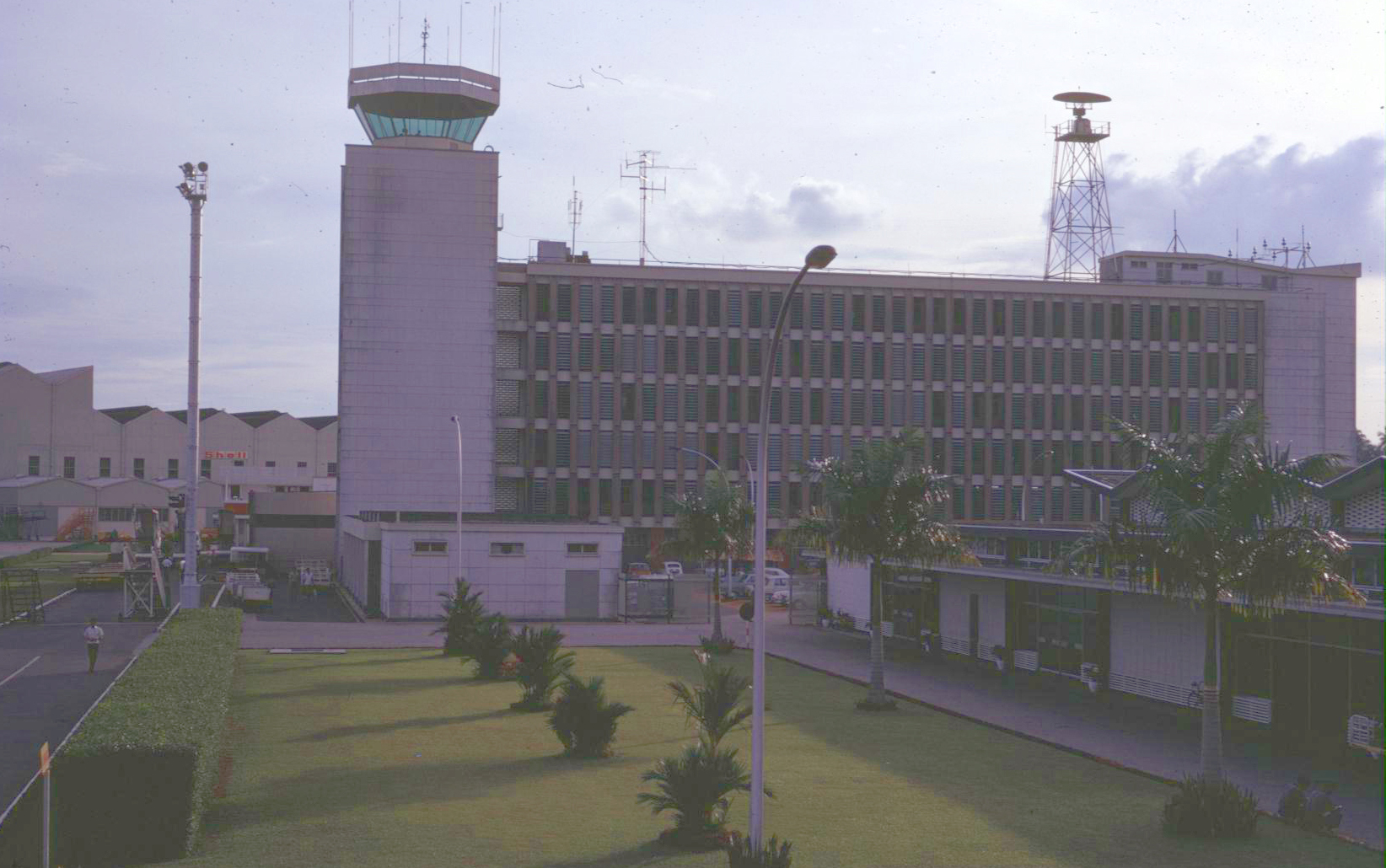
- The control tower and terminal building in 1971

Site information
- Type: Military airbase
- Owner: Ministry of Defence
- Operator: Republic of Singapore Air Force
- Controlled by: Republic of Singapore Air Force
- Condition: Operational

Location
- Location in Singapore
- Coordinates: 01°21′37″N 103°54′34″E

Site history
- Built: 21 August 1955; 71 years ago (as Singapore International Airport)
- In use: 1955 – present
- Fate: Decommissioned by 2030s

Airfield information
- Identifiers: IATA: QPG, ICAO: WSAP
Runways
Direction	Length and surface
02/20	3,780 metres (12,402 ft) Asphalt

Paya Lebar Air Base (IATA: QPG, ICAO: WSAP) is a military airbase operated by the Republic of Singapore Air Force (RSAF), situated along Airport Road in Paya Lebar, within the eastern region of Singapore. Serving as a key installation for the RSAF, the airbase adopts the motto Strength Through Readiness, reflecting its operational commitment and strategic significance within Singapore's defence framework.

Originally established in 1955 as the Singapore International Airport, it was built to replace the former Kallang Airport as the country’s main civil aviation hub. The airport played a crucial role in Singapore’s early aviation history until 1980, when civilian air traffic was moved to Changi Airport. That same year, control of the facility was handed over to the RSAF, and the site was officially designated as Paya Lebar Air Base.

According to the Urban Redevelopment Authority (URA)'s Master Plan, Paya Lebar Air Base is planned for decommissioning by around 2030. The site will be redeveloped into a new town, featuring residential and commercial areas. In preparation for this, RSAF operations are progressively being shifted to other airbases across the country, including expanded facilities at Changi and Tengah, throughout the 2020s.

== History ==
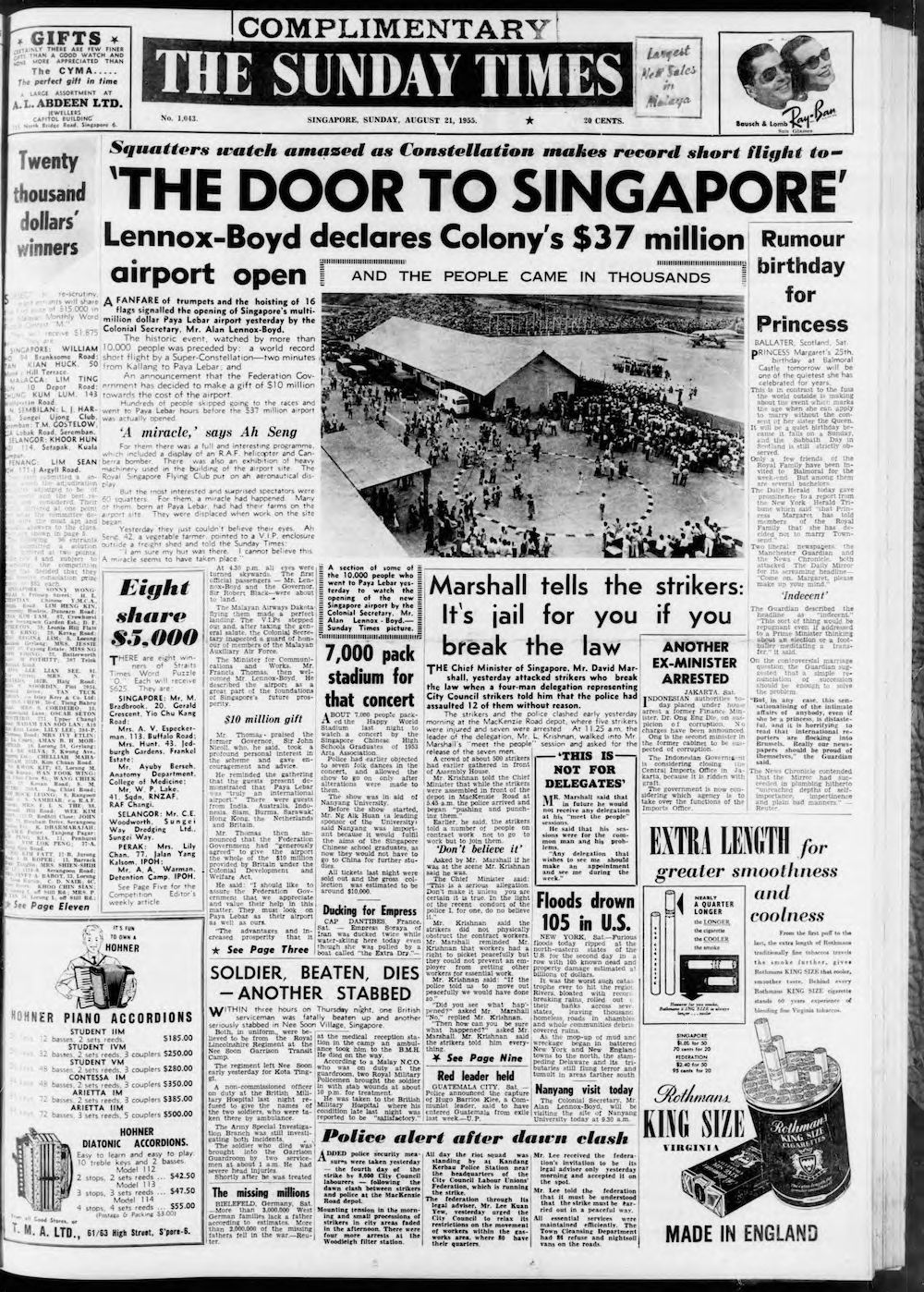
The Sunday Times on 21 August 1955, reporting on the opening of Paya Lebar Airport by Colonial Secretary Alan Lennox-Boyd, 1st Viscount Boyd of Merton

The airport was constructed between 1952 and 1955, officially opening on 20 August 1955 with a ceremony led by the Secretary of State for the Colonies, Alan Lennox-Boyd, 1st Viscount Boyd of Merton. The project cost approximately $37 million and was designed by J. J. Bryan, a public works engineer with prior experience in airport construction across Asia. Serving as Singapore’s main international gateway at the time, it replaced the older Kallang Airport and quickly became an important regional aviation hub.

Eventually, in 1958, a few military hangars were converted into a spacious civil air terminal. Banking, postal and cable services, money exchange, shops and restaurants were introduced.

During its early years, the airport served as one of two main hubs for Malayan Airways. In 1958, the airline conducted its first service outside Southeast Asia using a DC-4 leased from Qantas, flying to Hong Kong. Over the next few years, the airline introduced turboprop aircraft and rebranded as Malaysian Airways. In 1962, a joint RAF and Singapore civil Air Traffic Control service was established to provide military cover for air defence. British Eagle’s Britannia aircraft supported British military logistics, while the introduction of the de Havilland Comet 4C and later the Vickers VC10 aircraft significantly reduced travel time.

By 1966, the airline had shifted its focus to Singapore, acquiring Boeing 707s and adopting the name Malaysia-Singapore Airlines, operating with a distinctive fluorescent yellow livery. In the same year, the airport handled 770,562 passengers and by 1968 had a capacity of 3 and a half million passengers. Paya Lebar became its primary hub, with routes expanding into North Asia. Malaysia-Singapore Airlines was dissolved in 1972, splitting into Malaysia Airlines and Singapore Airlines, the latter retaining the 707 fleet and continuing operations at Paya Lebar. From 1979 to 1980, British Airways, in collaboration with Singapore Airlines, operated supersonic Concorde flights from London's Heathrow Airport to Paya Lebar. However, as the airport became increasingly constrained by surrounding housing estates, a new airport was commissioned. A new arrivals building and cargo terminal was built in 1977, the arrivals building costing S$3.5 million. Construction of Changi Airport began in 1975 and was completed in 1981, at which point civil operations ceased at Paya Lebar and the IATA airport code SIN and ICAO airport code WSSS were officially transferred to Changi.

=== Conversion to military use ===
The airport began its transition into a military facility in late 1967 with the construction of an Air Movement Centre to support the Republic of Singapore Air Force (RSAF), the Ministry of Defence charter flights and foreign military aircraft. Key structures such as the terminal building, hangar and control tower were retained but restricted from public access. The transformation was completed in 1981 when all civilian operations moved to Changi, after which the site was fully converted into a military airbase and officially renamed Paya Lebar Air Base (PLAB).

==== Paya Lebar Air Base ====
The air base currently houses aircraft such as the C-130 Hercules and two squadrons of F-15SG Strike Eagles.

The flying squadrons are:

- 122 Squadron with 10 C-130 Hercules,
- 142 Squadron with 15 F-15SG Strike Eagles,
- 149 Squadron with at least 24 F-15SG Strike Eagles

The support squadrons are:

- Air Logistics Squadron (ALS)
- Airfield Maintenance Squadron (AMS)
- Field Defence Squadron (FDS)
- Flying Support Squadron (FSS)

Former squadrons based here are:

- 141 Squadron with F-5S/T, RF-5S
- 144 Squadron with F-5S/T

==== Use by the United States Air Force ====
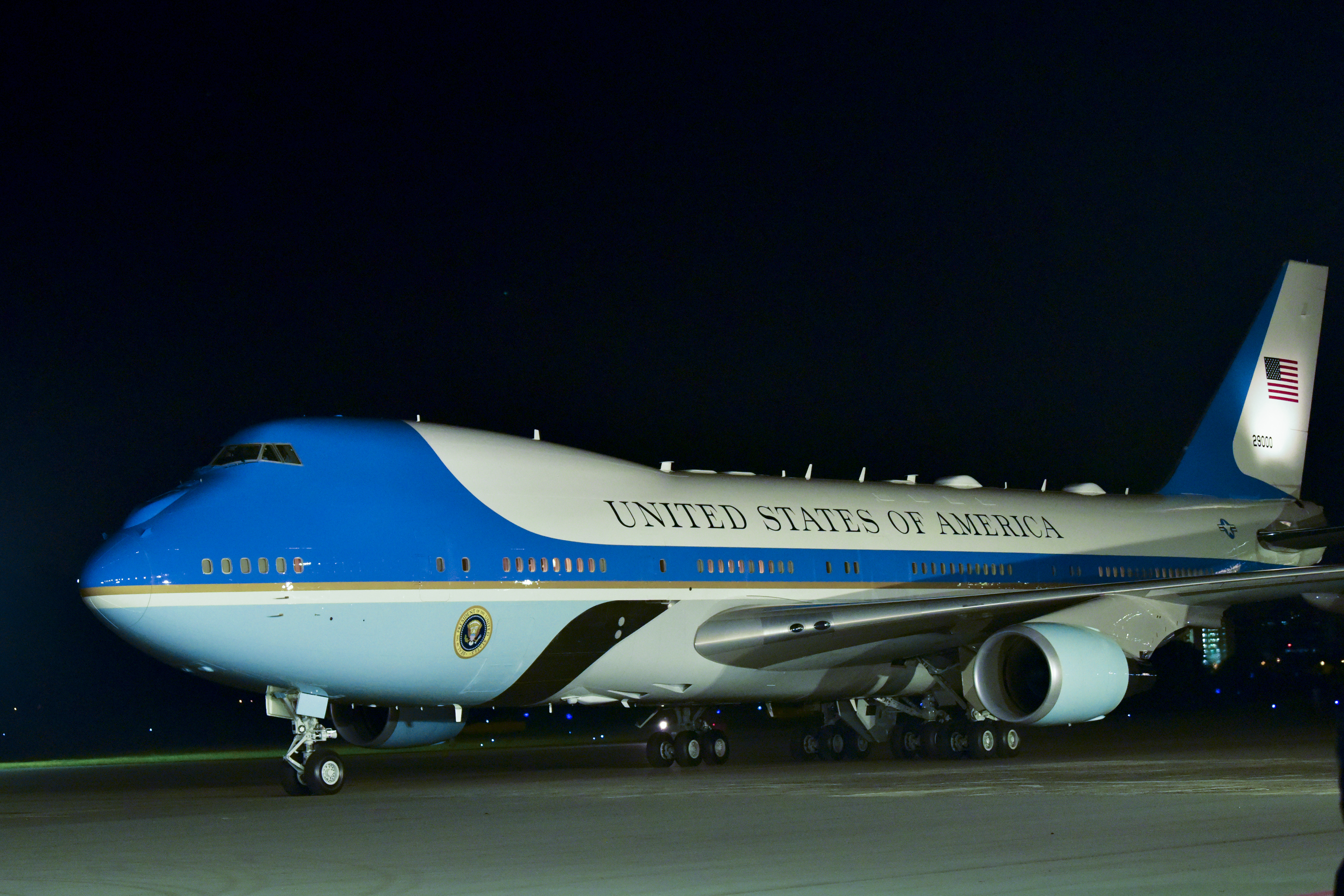
Air Force One carrying U.S. President Donald Trump landing at Paya Lebar for the 2018 North Korea–United States summit

Under Singapore's authorisation, Paya Lebar Air Base is utilised by several units of the United States Air Force and United States Navy, including elements of the United States Marine Corps Aviation. It serves as a strategic refuelling and staging post for transiting aircraft, particularly within the Indo-Pacific region. Since 31 October 1991, the 497th Combat Training Squadron has been permanently based at Paya Lebar, conducting regular flight operations in coordination with the Republic of Singapore Air Force.

The airbase also frequently receives VIP aircraft operated by the United States government. Air Force One has landed at the base during several official visits by American presidents, including George W. Bush in October 2003 and November 2006, and by Barack Obama on 14 November 2009 for the APEC Singapore 2009 Summit. In 2007, Air Force Two carrying U.S. Vice President Dick Cheney made a refuelling stop and underwent minor repairs at the base while en route from Australia.

In more recent years, the base continued to be a key transit point for high-profile visits involving the United States. U.S. President Donald Trump arrived aboard the Air Force One's Boeing VC-25A on 10 June 2018 to attend the 2018 North Korea–United States summit, while North Korean leader Kim Jong Un landed separately at Changi on an Air China's Boeing 747-400. Early media reports speculated that Kim would land at PLAB in an Air Koryo's Ilyushin Il-62. On 22 August 2021, Air Force Two carrying Vice President Kamala Harris also landed at Paya Lebar for an official visit to Singapore. The airbase regularly accommodates aircraft such as the Boeing E-4B during visits by the United States Secretary of Defense, and the Boeing C-32 used by the United States Secretary of State and Vice President.

=== Decommissioning ===
Paya Lebar is expected to be decommissioned from 2030, with expansion works currently underway at Tengah Air Base and Changi Air Base during the 2020s to accommodate the relocation of RSAF assets. Following its closure, height restrictions in the Central Area will be relaxed, and Paya Lebar will be redeveloped into a new town comprising housing, offices, factories and green spaces. Heritage elements such as the former runway and buildings may be preserved as part of parks and museums within the new development.

== Former airlines ==
Airlines that flew to what is now Paya Lebar Air Base as of 1968:

- Air India
- Malaysia–Singapore Airlines
- BOAC
- Air Ceylon
- Qantas
- Cathay Pacific
- Thai International
- Garuda Indonesian Airways
- Pan American Airways
- Japan Airlines
- Philippine Airlines
- Swissair
- Filipinas Orient Airways
- Air New Zealand
- CAAC
- Scandinavian Airlines System

== Statistics ==
These statistics are sourced from two books.

Year	Passengers (total)	Cargo (tonnes)	Aircraft Movements	Transport Movements
1958	250,000	N/A	N/A	N/A
1966	770,562	N/A	N/A	N/A
1970	1,688,199	21,062	51,508	34,893
1975	3,324,044	66,087	64,959	58,820
1976	4,495,315	79,590	65,089	57,634
1977	5,130,286	88,555	66,950	59,997
1978	5,697,571	58,093	71,822	N/A

== Photo gallery ==
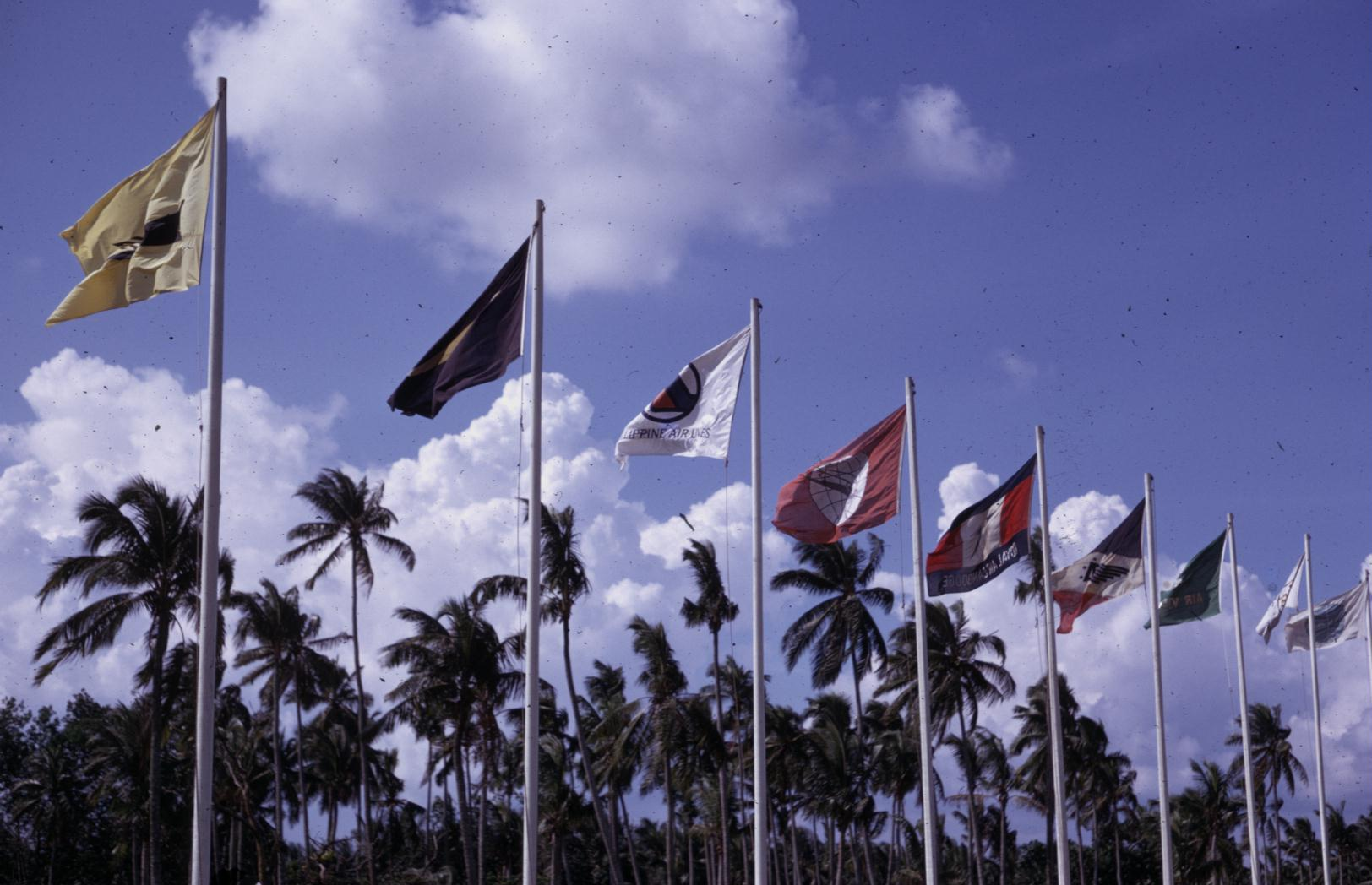
Flags outside Singapore International Airport, photographed February 1969 × July 1971.

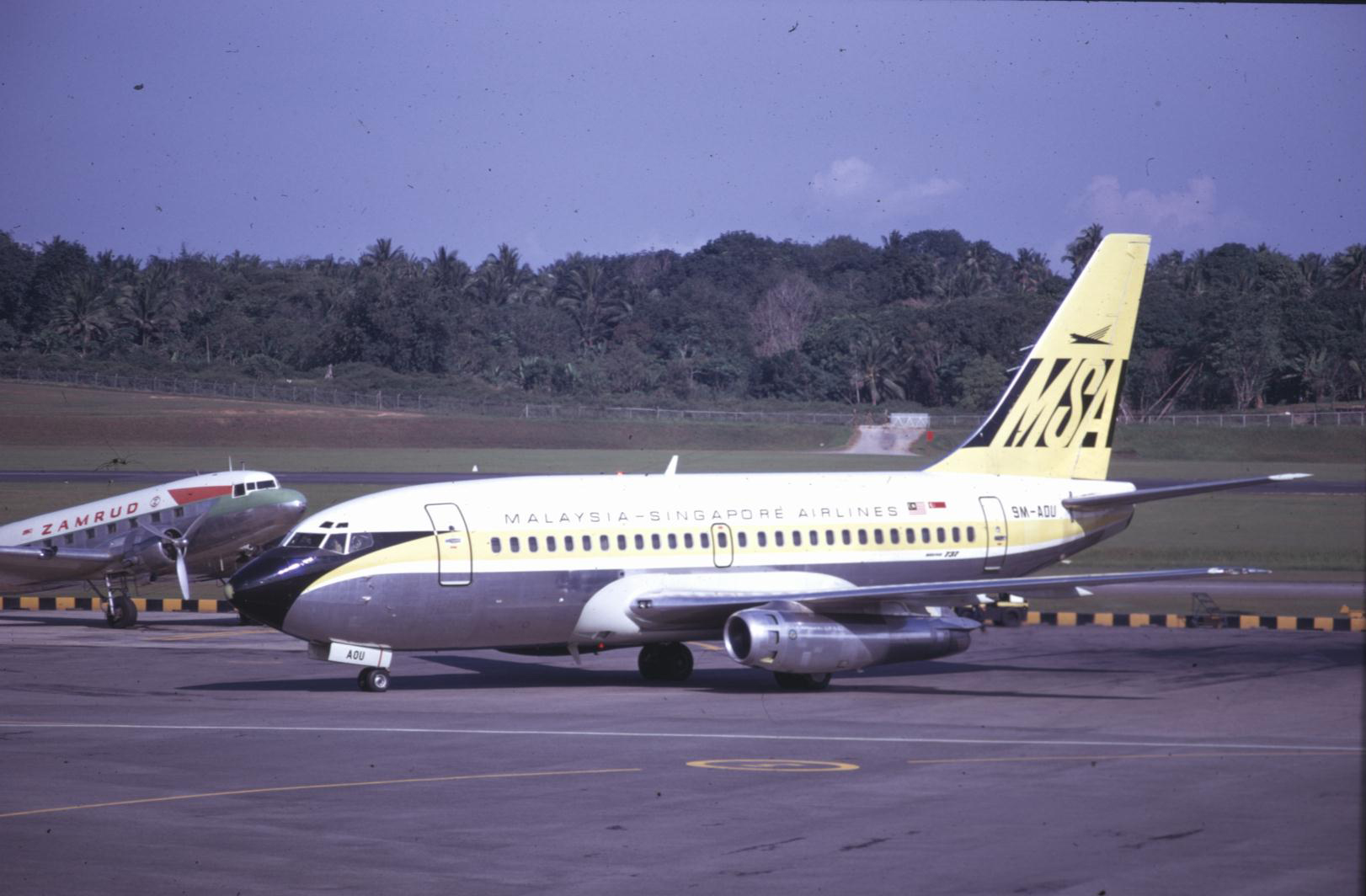
Malaysia-Singapore Airlines Boeing 737-100

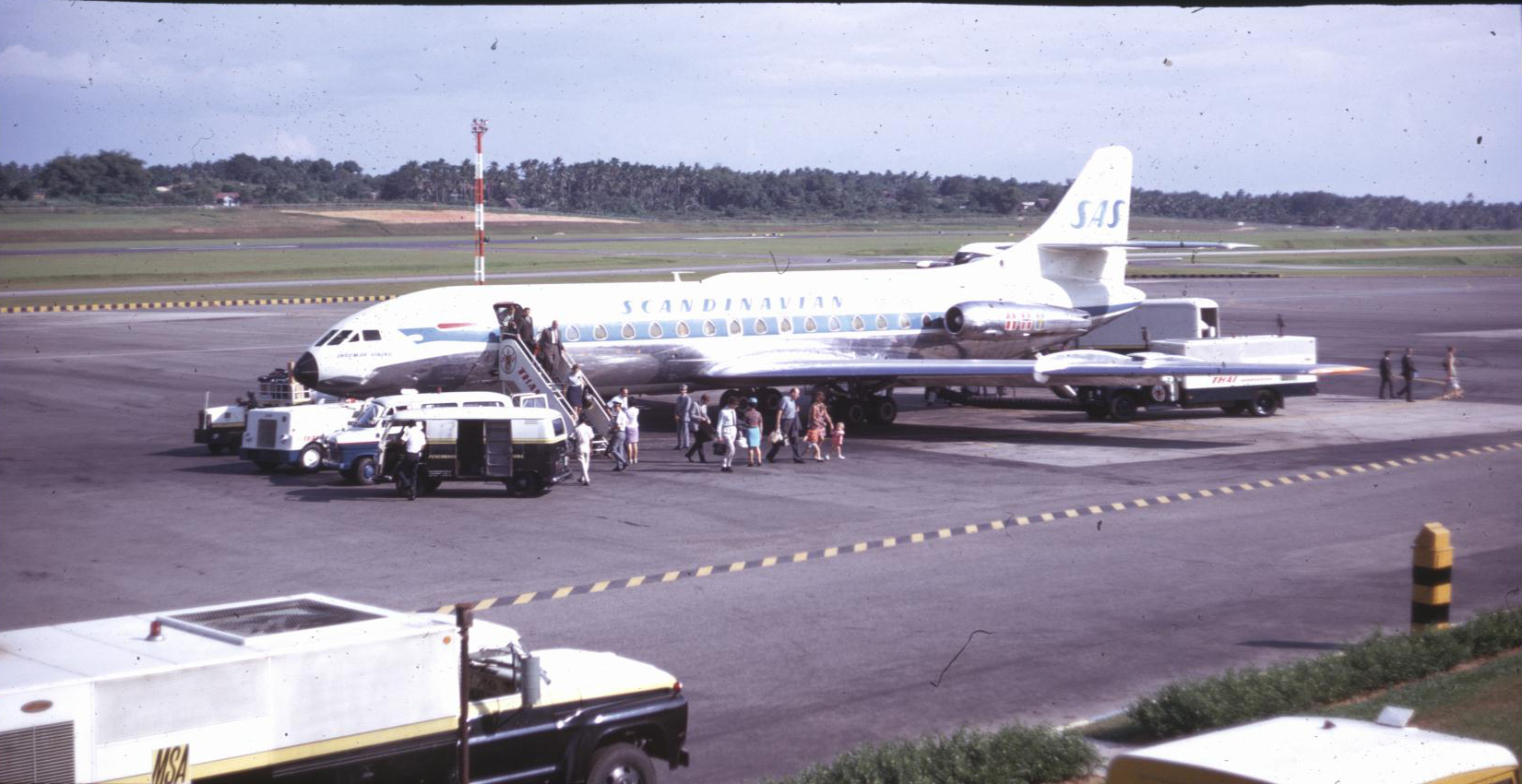
SAS Caravelle at Singapore International Airport, photographed February 1969 × July 1971.

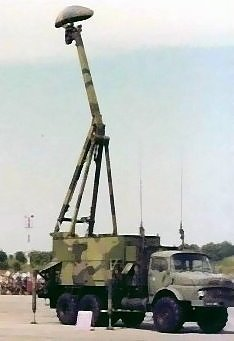
1988, a GIRAFFE S 3D radar on display at Paya Lebar Air Base.

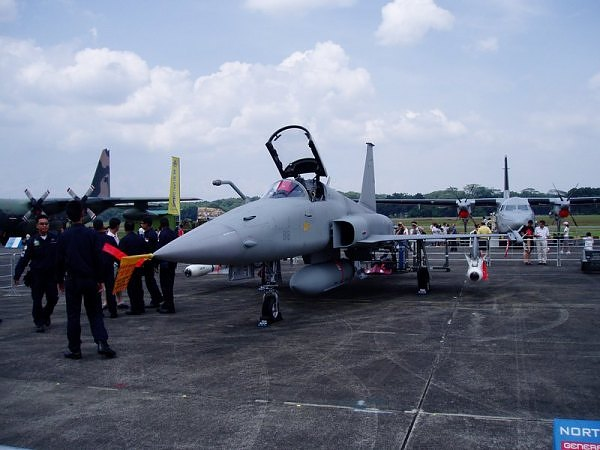
An AGM-65 Maverick armed Northrop F-5S Tiger-II.

== Legacy ==
Being Singapore's first major international airport, the old passenger terminal building and control tower still stands, though they now house air force units and are off-limits to the public. Nevertheless, much of the interior still remains intact and is almost completely preserved from the time it was first built. The road which used to lead to the old passenger terminal is also still known as Airport Road.

=== Air Force Museum ===
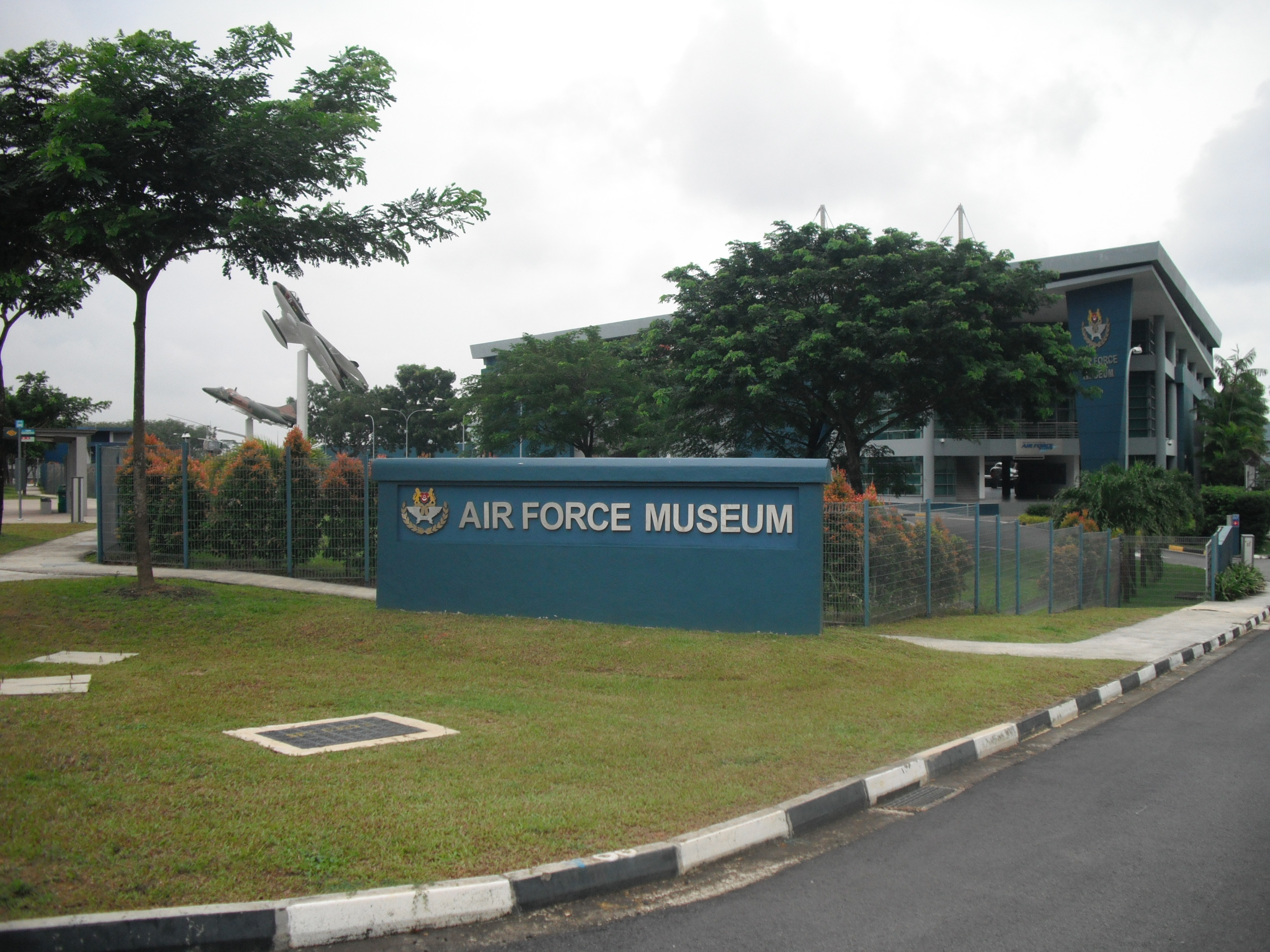
The RSAF Museum

The RSAF maintains the Air Force Museum, which is open to the public and showcases the air force's history and capabilities. The museum is located at 400 Airport Road, Singapore 534234 beside the airbase. It went through an upgrade and update of the exhibits in 2015.

== See also ==
- Task Force 73/Commander, Logistics Group Western Pacific
