= Military recruit training =

Initial indoctrination and instruction given to new military personnel

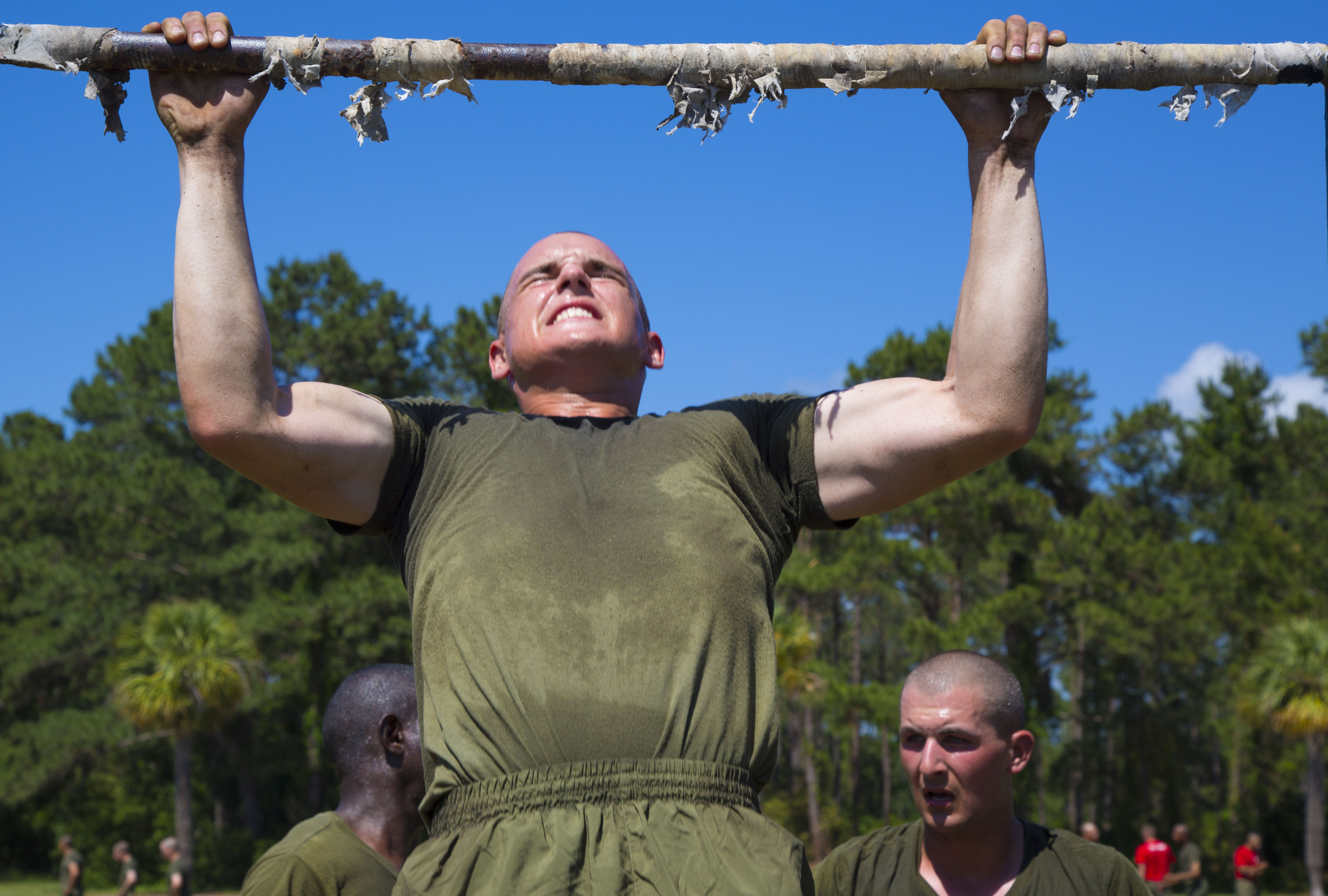
U.S Marine Corps recruits during physical training

Military recruit training, commonly known as basic training or boot camp, refers to the initial instruction of new military personnel. It is a physically and psychologically intensive process, which resocializes its subjects for the unique demands of military employment.

== Major characteristics ==
Initial military training is an intensive residential program commonly lasting several weeks or months, which aims to induct newly recruited military personnel into the social norms and essential tasks of the armed forces. Common features include foot drill, inspections, physical training, weapons training, and a graduation parade.

The training process resocializes recruits to the demands made of them by military life. Psychological conditioning techniques are used to shape attitudes and behaviours, so that recruits will obey all orders, face mortal danger, and kill their opponents in battle. According to an expert in United States military training methods, Dave Grossman, recruit training makes extensive use of four types of conditioning techniques: role modeling, classical conditioning, operant conditioning, and brutalization.

Inductees are required to partially submerge their individuality for the sake of their military unit, which enhances obedience to orders to perform actions normally absent from civilian life, including killing and prolonged exposure to danger.

The resocialization of recruit training operates in several ways, as follows:

=== Confinement and suppression ===
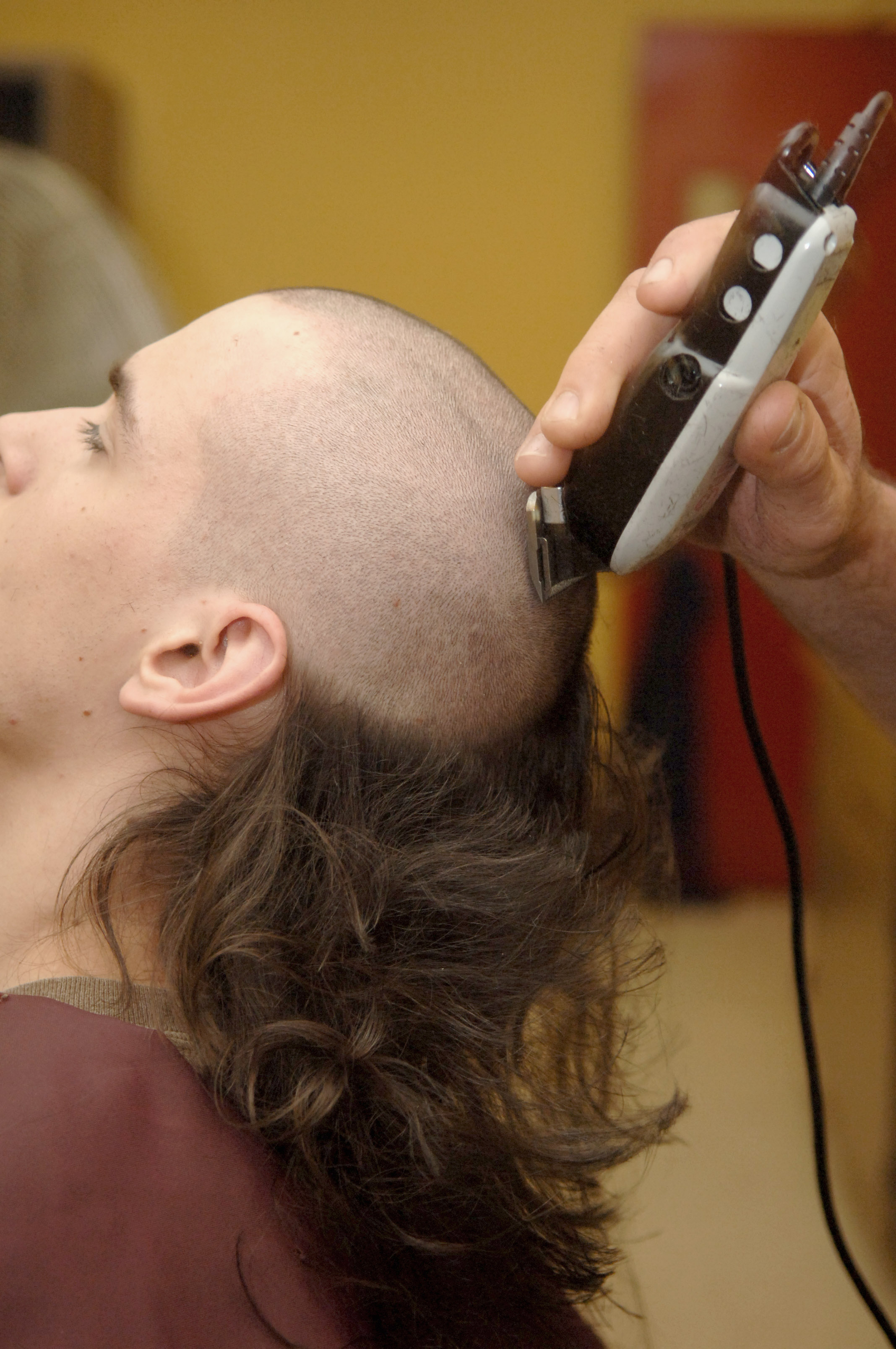
A recruit in the U.S. Marine Corps is shaved before his initial training begins, 2006.

Once their training has begun, the right of recruits to leave the military estate (or to quit the armed forces) is denied or tightly restricted. By shaving the head, issuing uniforms, denying privacy, and prohibiting the use of first names, individuality is suppressed.

=== Control and conformity ===
Recruits' daily routine is highly controlled, in the manner of the 'total institution' described by the Canadian-American sociologist Erving Goffman. For example, the training regime determines how recruits must make their beds, polish boots, and stack their clothes; mistakes are punished.

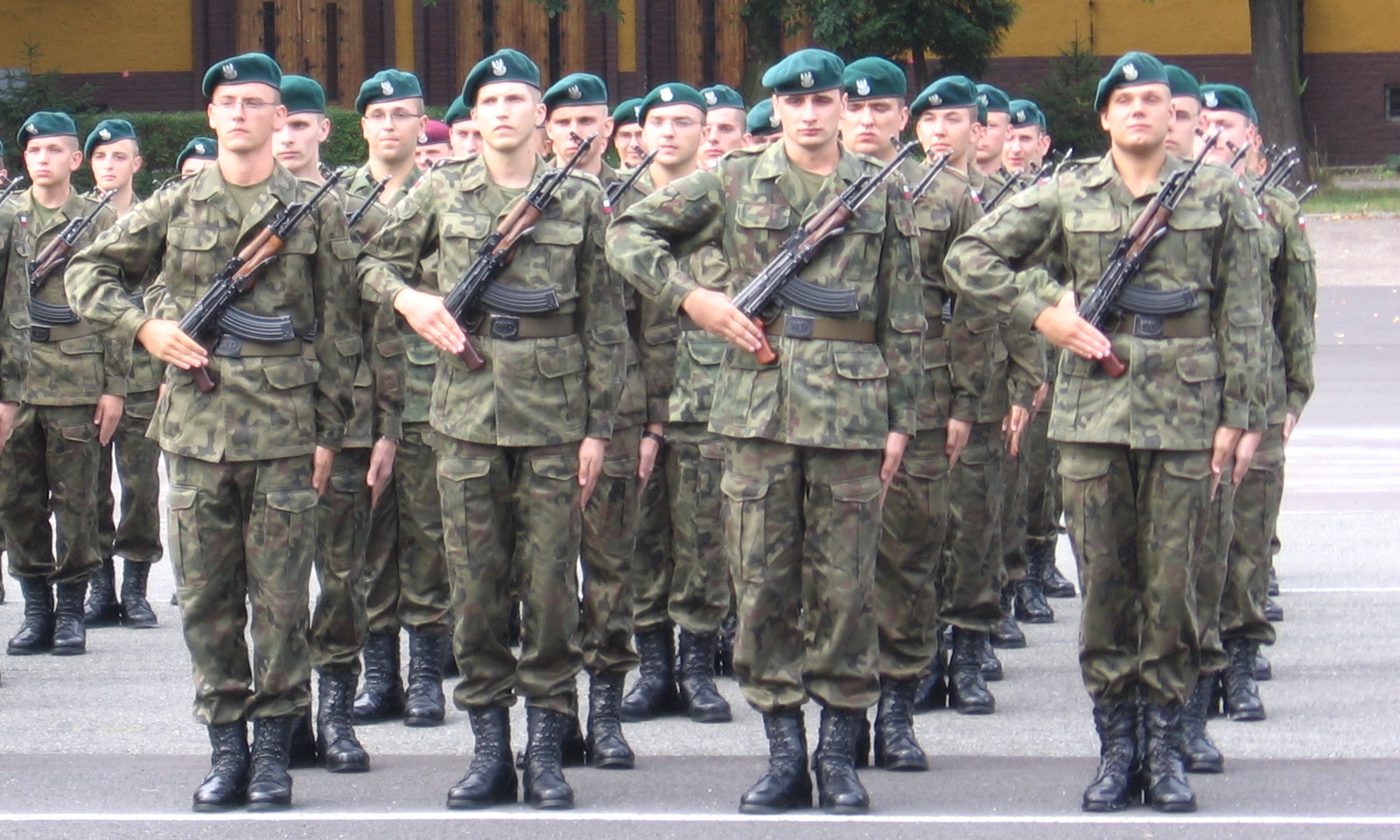
Polish Army recruits on foot drill, 2007

Throughout their training, recruits are conditioned to conform to military norms and to work as a team. In particular, recruits are repeatedly instructed to stand, march, and respond to orders in a ritual known as foot drill, which is derived from 18th-century military practices and trains recruits to obey orders without hesitation or question. According to Finnish Army regulations, for example, foot drill is essential for the esprit de corps and cohesion, accustoms recruits to instinctive obedience, enables large units to be marched and moved in an orderly manner, and creates the basis for action in the battlefield.

=== Stress and punishment ===
The training process applies stressors continuously. Instructors may deprive recruits of sleep, food, or shelter; shout personal insults; use physical aggression; or give orders intended to humiliate. According to specialists in U.S. recruit training, the conditions of continuous stress deplete recruits' resistance to the demands made of them.

The intense workload and sleep restriction experienced by military recruits leaves them little attention capacity for processing the messages they receive about new norms… Therefore, recruits should be less likely to devote their remaining cognitive effort to judging the quality of persuasive messages and will be more likely to be persuaded by the messages…

Evidence from Canada, the UK, the U.S. and elsewhere shows that punishments are used routinely to condition group conformity and discourage poor performance. The role of group punishment in Canadian Army training, for example, has been described as follows:

Coming from civilian society that elevates the individual, recruits are now in a world where the institutional value of the group is supreme. One has to be a team player or risk ostracism. The military does things quite deliberately to intensify the power of group pressure within its ranks. The group is made responsible for each member... even though it may seem manifestly unfair to make the group suffer for the individual.

=== Bonding and the hierarchy of esteem ===
As a buffer against the stressful conditions of their training, the trainee group normally forms a strong bond of mutual loyalty. Researchers in the U.S. have described it as an intense "we-feeling", which can feel more powerful than the civilian bonds that recruits are familiar with. In 2006, an official report on Australian Defence Force training explained the importance of the group bond:

Willingness to apply lethal force requires… sufficient bonding within the team to override each individual's natural human resistance to kill. The toughness and bonding required increases the closer the contact with the enemy.

Recruits are taught to be proud of their identity as professional military personnel, and of their unit in particular. Heroic regimental stories and symbols are used to ennoble the recruits' own unit above others, and above other branches of the armed forces (an aspect of interservice rivalry), thereby establishing a hierarchy of esteem (also known as a hierarchy of respect); the same stories are used to draw a contrast with the purported inferior norms associated with civilian life. (Cf. Unit cohesion)

=== Aggression and dehumanization ===
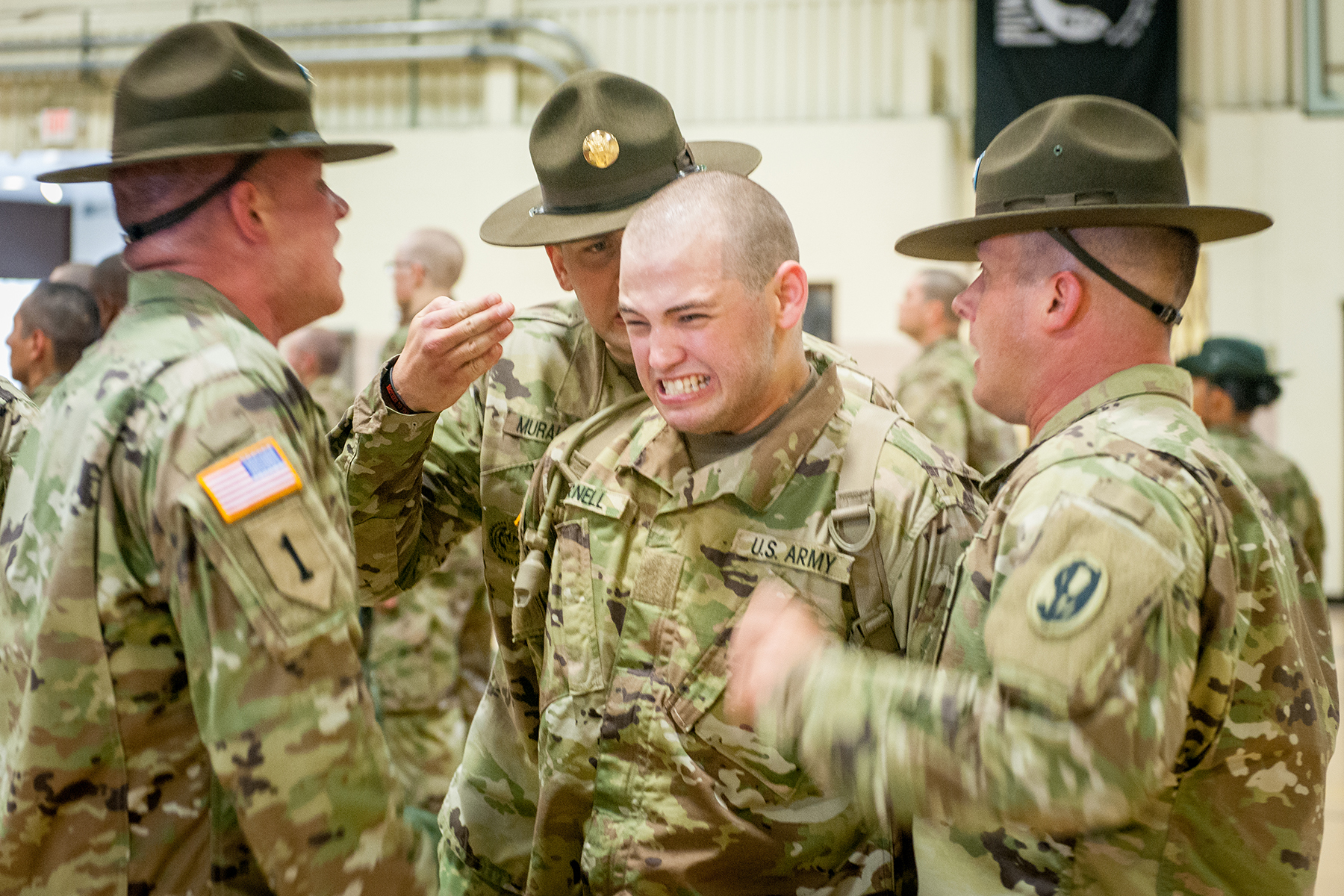
U.S. Army drill sergeants training a recruit

Evidence from Australia, the UK and the U.S. shows that recruit training systematically stimulates aggression, particularly in those enlisted for ground close combat roles. Bayonet practice is an example, as the strong language of this instruction from a British army corporal illustrates:

I wanna see it in your eyes that you wanna kill these fuckers. Imagine these dummies are the fucking Taliban and they've just killed some of your mates. You wanna fuckin' kill them. Show me your war face!
[Recruits yell]
You need some fucking more aggression, show me your war face.

Another example is milling, an exercise used for infantry training in which pairs of recruits wearing boxing gloves punch each other in the head as aggressively as possible.

=== Fieldcraft and fitness ===
Recruits are taught the basic skills of their profession, such as military tactics, first aid, managing their affairs in the field, and the use of weaponry and other equipment.

Throughout, the physical fitness of recruits is tested and developed, although evidence from Israel, Norway, South Africa, the UK and the U.S. has found that the heavy strain on the body also leads to a high rate of injury.

=== Graduation and drop-out ===
Recruits who complete their initial training normally take part in a graduation parade (also called passing-out or marching-out). The parade is observed by their family and friends, and senior military personnel. Recruits then pass to the next stage of their training, if applicable.

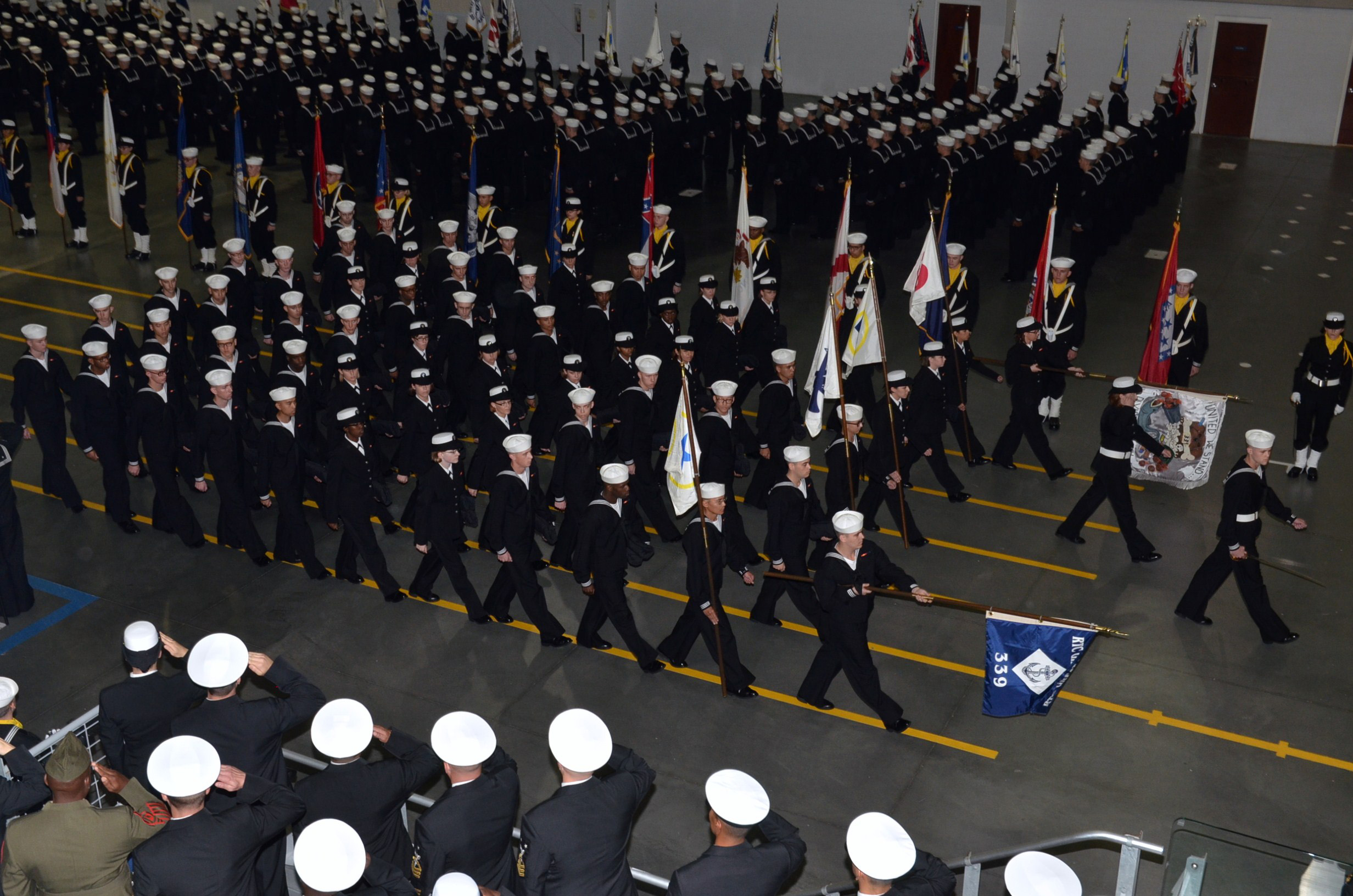
U.S. Navy recruits complete their initial training with a graduation parade, 2011.

A large percentage of recruits drop out of training. For example, attrition among British infantry recruits has been found to be above 30% during the first 12 weeks. Reasons for this include dismissal for behavioural problems, poor performance, or injury, and furthermore, recruits who choose to leave if and when they have a legal right to do so. In the UK and U.S., recruits under the age of 20 are most likely to drop out in these ways.

== Variations in recruit training ==
Recruit training varies by nation according to the national requirement and can be voluntary (volunteer military) or mandatory (conscription). Some nations operate both volunteer and conscription systems simultaneously.

Recruit training differs according to military branch:

- Army and Marine Corps recruits are normally trained in basic marksmanship with individually assigned weapons, field maintenance of weapons, physical fitness training, first aid, and basic survival and infantry techniques.
- Navy and Coast Guard training usually focuses on water survival training, physical fitness, basic seamanship, and such skills as shipboard firefighting, basic engineering, and signals.
- Air Force and Space Force training usually includes physical fitness training, military and classroom instructions, basic airmanship/guardianship and field training in basic marksmanship and first aid.

== Australia ==
Most of the recruit training in the Australian Army is currently held at Army Recruit Training Centre (ARTC) at Kapooka, near Wagga Wagga in New South Wales. Recruit training lasts 80 days for members of the Australian Regular Army and 35 days for members of the Australian Army Reserve. In basic training recruits are taught drill, weapons and workplace safety, basic equipment maintenance, marksmanship, fieldcraft, radio use and defensive/offensive operations.

=== Regional Force Surveillance Units ===
Training for recruits in the Regional Force Surveillance Units usually differs greatly from training in the rest of the Army. For instance, NORFORCE recruits attend a 2-week course at the Kangaroo Flats. Recruits from areas covered by the RFSUs often come from indigenous cultures radically different from that of the general Australian population, and as such many regular standards and methods of training are not as applicable in their case.

=== Royal Military College Duntroon ===
Recruit Training for officers in the Australian Army (known as ICT—Initial Cadet Training) takes place at Royal Military College, Duntroon (RMC). The ICT is conducted for approximately seven weeks after which staff cadets continue military instruction in skills such as weapons training, military history, leadership, strategic studies and other such skills at section, platoon and company levels. Trainees at RMC hold the rank of Staff Cadet and, if successful in completing the course are commissioned as Lieutenants (pronounced Left-tenant). The overall full-time officer training course at RMC is 18 months long.

== Canada ==
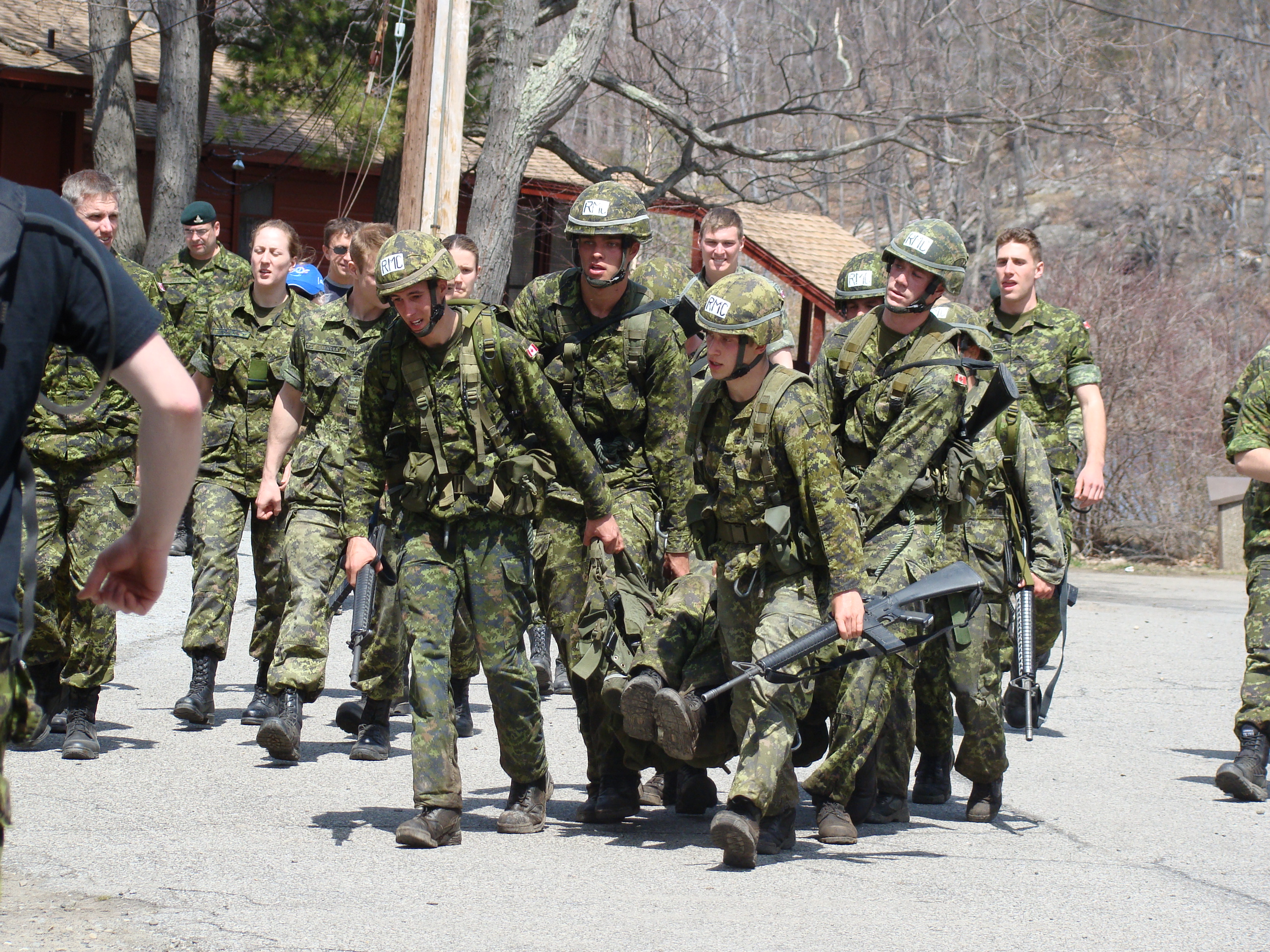
Royal Military College of Canada cadets compete in the Sandhurst Competition.

Centralized recruit training in the Canadian Army did not exist until 1940, and until the creation of Basic Training Centres across Canada, recruit training had been done by individual units or depots.

In 1968 the Canadian Army, Royal Canadian Navy, and Royal Canadian Air Force were unified into one service, the Canadian Forces. The Canadian Forces Training System, a unified system for all the services, was devised and remains in place today.

Most non-commissioned CF recruits in the Regular Force (full-time) participate in the 9-week Basic Military Qualification (BMQ) at Canadian Forces Leadership and Recruit School at Saint-Jean-sur-Richelieu, Quebec. Regular Force officers complete their 12-week Basic Military Officer Qualification (BMOQ) at CFLRS as well, before moving on to Second Language Training or their occupational training.

After basic training, personnel are trained in the specialty of their "environment". Members of the Royal Canadian Navy undergo a four-week sea environment training course; with members of the Canadian Army undergo a 22-day Soldier Qualification course, while officers go through a 12-week Common Army Phase (now renamed to Basic Military Officer Qualification-Army); while members from the Royal Canadian Air Force move on directly to their trade training, with the exception of Construction Engineer Officers, who also do BMOQ-A.

Reservists, particularly the Army Reserve, may conduct basic and trades training part-time, generally alternating weekends with their own units. Due to increased integration of the Regular and Reserve Force, many reservists attend courses hosted by the Regular Force. Members of the Army Reserves complete an 8-week BMQ/SQ combined course (Basic Military Qualification and Soldier Qualification) during the summer. Formerly the Naval and Air Reserve jointly conduct BMQ for its recruits at the Naval Reserve Training Division Borden, Ontario equivalent to Regular Force BMQ, at Canadian Forces Base Borden. Now the Naval Reserve conducts the Basic Military Naval Qualification in CFB Valcartier by the Canadian Forces Fleet School Québec (a combination of recruit training and naval environmental training which leads to savings in the training). The Navy trains its personnel in seamanship, firefighting, damage control and other skills after BMQ, in the Naval Environmental Training Program (NETP) in either Esquimalt, British Columbia or Halifax, Nova Scotia.

The Royal Military College of Canada is the military academy of the Canadian Forces, and is a degree-granting university. The Royal Military College Saint-Jean is a Canadian military academy located on the site of Fort Saint-Jean (Quebec),

== Denmark ==
The Danish Army conducts the HBU (Hærens Basisuddannelse, Army Basic Training course) at 8 bases around the country. The course lasts four months, and has its focus on training skills used in connection with the Danish total defence, and on recruiting for the army's international missions, and for the NCO-schools. The recruits are technically conscripts, but during recession years, many young men and woman have volunteered for HBU.

== Finland ==
Training lasts 5.5 to 11.5 months total, depending on an individual specialization. All Finnish conscripts undergo six weeks of basic training (peruskoulutuskausi), which is essentially the same for all servicemen. It includes assault rifle (RK-62/RK-95) marksman training, few other basic weapon training, battle training, short field medic training and camping skills. At the end of this training, all men are promoted to their first military rank. After this, specialized training is given depending on the person (5,5–11,5 months). The NCO trainees go to AUK (NCO school) and become corporals or sergeants, from which some are selected to RUK (Reserve officer school) and become second lieutenants. Leadership training (officer candidates and NCOs) always lasts 11.5 months.

== France ==
In the French army, the "Formation Générale Initiale" (FGI) is a 12 weeks course which occurs in a Centre de Formation Initiale des Militaires du Rang (CFIM). There are 10 CFIM in the country. Prior to this course, new recruits are joining the regiment they are going to serve during 3 to 5 years for reception week where they get issued gear, complete administrative documents and a final medical exam before starting training => in France any enlisted soldier signs not only for a MOS but also a unit to serve.

After completing the 12 week FGI course, recruits are receiving the AFFIM certificate (say BCT graduation) and are considered as private 2nd class. After one week of leave, they go back to their regiment for the Formation de Spécialité Initiale (FSI) => MOS training.

After FGI+FSI, they can start training with their platoon for external deployment. Usually, Private 1st class rank is earned after 6 to 12 month of time in service.

For some units (mountain troops - airborne), there is also during first year a Formation d'Adaptation (FA) for basic mountain training (2 × 2 weeks) or parachute school (3 weeks)

Content of FGI is the following one:

Drills, First aid and chemical warfare, PT and obstacle course, First weapon qualification (FAMAS, pistol and grenade), Signals, Basic field and infantry training (even if not MOS11B later on), Presentation of French army, soldiers duties and reports.

== Germany ==
The Allgemeine Grundausbildung (AGA) (i.e. general basic training) of the Bundeswehr covers the first three months of military service.

The contents of the "Allgemeine Grundausbildung" includes

- Formal training (ranks, flags, orders and other fundamentals)
- Weapon Drill and Basic Combat training for all soldiers (Rifle, Pistol and machine gun drills are mandatory for every soldier)
- Theoretical Courses about Democracy and legal regulations
- Sports: the Basic Fitness Test (BFT) and the German Sports Badge (DSA)
- Guard duty training (ATB SichSdt)
- First Aid

A notable peculiarity of German basic training is rooted in German military tradition that prefers initiative to obedience. Rather than "breaking" the personality of new recruits through intimidation and aggression, German basic training generally tries to "mold" a recruits personality in the hope of producing soldiers with stronger personalities and more own initiative.

== Greece ==
While until 2000 the Greek Army was mainly conscript based, since then a large Professional Enlisted institution has been adopted, which combined with the reduction of conscript service will produce an approximate 1:1 ratio between conscript and professional enlisted. While initially training of the two institutions was shared, it has since then diverged, and conscript training has been reduced in length while professional enlisted training has been increased.

== India ==
The Indian military services have established numerous and distinguished academies and staff colleges across India for the purpose of training professional soldiers in new generation military sciences, warfare command and strategy, and associated technologies.

== Israel ==
The recruit training of the Israel Defense Forces (called tironut in Hebrew) varies depending on the unit: virtually every unusual unit completes a different training course. Recruits are certified as riflemen after the completion of the training, while most non-combat units train in all-army bases for the certification of Rifleman 02. Individuals who want to become officers must apply to be trained at a facility in the Negev desert called "Bahad One" (abbreviation of "Bsis Hadracha", Instruction Base).

== Norway ==
As part of national service in Norway, all recruits go through basic training. Army: HSRF (Hærens skole for rekrutt- og fagutdanning; Army School for basic and vocational training) provides basic and vocational training for recruits, including the Armed Forces Joint Services and the Armed Forces Medical Services. Navy and Air Force: KNM Harald Haarfagre, founded in 1871, is a joint school for the Navy and Air Force in the Madla district of Stavanger. The basic training period is eight weeks. Recruits are trained in military conduct, close order drill, weapons and combat tactics, as well as professional skills for relevant branches of arms.

== Pakistan ==
The Pakistan Military Academy (or PMA) is a military academy of the Pakistan Army. It is located at Kakul in Abbottabad in the Khyber Pakhtunkhwa. The Pakistan Military Academy is analogous to Sandhurst, West Point or Tironut and undertakes training of the prospective officers of Pakistan Army. The academy has four training battalions and sixteen companies. A Cadet is trained and passed out as an officer of the Pakistan Army in 2 years.

Enlisted Men undertake training at the Regimental Center of their chosen regiment.

== Singapore ==
National Service (NS) in Singapore is obligatory for all able-bodied male citizens and second generation permanent residents who have reached the age of 18. Conscripts enlisted into the Singapore Armed Forces are required to attend Basic Military Training (BMT) at the beginning of their NS. They are known as Full-Time National Servicemen (NSFs).

Based on their Physical Employment Status (PES) grade determined by a pre-enlistment medical examination, NSFs may undergo either a standard, enhanced, modified, or obese BMT programme at the Basic Military Training Centre on the offshore island of Pulau Tekong or at the various military units that directly accept mono-intake PES A and B recruits. A similar 4-week BMT is conducted at Kranji School 5 for enlistees deemed unfit for combat roles.

Throughout their BMT, NSFs will acquire the basic soldiering skills by learning how to execute drills, undergoing physical training activities aimed at developing physical fitness and preparing them for the Individual Physical Proficiency Test (IPPT), learning how to handle the SAR 21 assault rifle and SFG 87 hand grenade, completing a Standard Obstacle Course and Battle Inoculation Course, and completing a five-day field camp, among other activities.

Before passing out from BMT, NSFs have to complete a 24 km (14.91 mi) route march in Full Battle Order and attend the Passing Out Parade, which may be held at the Marina Bay Floating Platform.

After completing BMT, NSFs will receive their posting orders to their respective vocations, which are determined by their PES status, suitability for deployment, and manpower requirements, among other conditions. Some NSFs will be directly posted to a military unit while others may undergo vocational training at certain institutes before being posted to units.

NSFs who perform well during BMT may progress to either the Specialist Cadet School or Officer Cadet School for further training to become Specialists (non-commissioned officers) or Officers.

NSFs will serve the remaining part of their NS in their respective units until their Operationally-Ready Date (ORD), whereupon they will be known as Operationally-Ready National Serviceman (NSmen) or reservists. NSmen may still be required to take the IPPT every year and attend In-Camp Training of up to 40 days per year over a period of ten years, or until they are statutorily discharged from NS at the age of 40 (for Warrant Officers, Specialists and Enlistees) or 50 (for Officers).

== Sri Lanka ==
In Sri Lanka, officer training is carried out at the General Sir John Kotelawala Defence University and at the respective Military Academies of each respective service.

Recruit training for enlisted personnel of the Sri Lanka Army is organised by the Army Training School and carried out at its premises and at several other locations. Following basic training specialized training would be carried out at Regimental Training Centres.

Basic training for new recruits of the Sri Lanka Navy which is approximately six months are conducted at Advanced Naval Training Center, SLNS 'Nipuna'; Naval Artificer Training Institute, SLNS 'Thakshila', Welisara; and at Naval Recruit Training Centres at several shore establishments. This basic training will be followed by on-the-job training on-board fleet units and at shore establishments. Combat Training School at SLNS 'Pandukabaya' conducts combat training for Naval Patrolmen.

Basic training for airmen of the Sri Lanka Air Force is handled by the Training Wing of the SLAF Diyatalawa. This is followed by secularized training at Advanced & Specialized Trade Training School.

== Sweden ==
Since conscription ended in Sweden in 2010 (reintroduced in 2017), all recruits who seek employment within the Swedish Armed Forces have to go through Grundläggande Militär Utbildning (GMU) (Basic Military Training) for three months.

Since conscription was reintroduced in 2017, all recruits who seek employment in the Swedish Armed Forces have to go through Grundutbildning (GU) (Basic Training), which consists of two parts; Grundläggande Militär Utbildning (GMU) (Basic Military Training) that lasts for 3 months and aims to provide every recruit with the same foundation for continued military service, and Befattningsutbildning (Specialization Education) for between 1–11 months depending on specialization.

There is also a shorter volunteer training program for people who seek service within the Home Guard called GU-F. GU-F training takes only 14 days, but following a completed GU-F, a guardsman may go through additional training in order to specialize within the Home Guard.

Basic training as part of GU as well as GU-F usually takes place at any of the Swedish Army training units.

== Switzerland ==
Switzerland has mandatory military service (German: Militärdienst; French: service militaire; Italian: servizio militare) in the Swiss Army for all able-bodied male citizens, who are conscripted when they reach the age of majority, though women may volunteer for any position. Conscripts make up the majority of the manpower in the Swiss Armed Forces.

At the age of 19, all male Swiss nationals must attend the two-day recruitment process in one of the six recruitment centres spread across Switzerland (Aarau, Payerne, Sumiswald, Monte Ceneri, Rüti, Mels). At the end of those two-days, if fit for service, recruits are assigned to a position in the Swiss Armed Forces.

A few months later, recruits start an 18-week (23-week for special forces) boot camp (German: Rekrutenschulen; French: école de recrues; Italian: scuola reclute) during which they are allowed to go home on week-ends. There are two boot camp start per year: January (Winter) and June (Summer). During the recruitment process, recruits can choose whether they would like to serve during summer or winter.

In the first seven weeks of boot camp, recruits receive "General Basic Instruction" (German: Allgemeine Grundausbildung; French: Instruction de base générale; Italian: Istruzione di base generale). During this period, recruits are instructed by their sergeants to military tactics, the use of weaponry (including SIG SG 550) and other equipment, marksmanship, self-defense skills, buddy- and self- aid, CBRN defense, basic survival skills, etc. Recruits are also educated to military life, including how to speak to their superiors, how to clean their weapons and combat shoes, how to clean the barracks, etc. During this period, recruits practice sport on a daily basis, including foot drill, running, team sports, push-ups, etc., and a few kilometers' march (up to 50 km) for some weeks.

The second phase of six weeks is devoted to function-specific basic instructions (German: Funktionsgrundausbildung; French: Instruction de base spécifique à la fonction; Italian: Istruzione di base alla funzione), where recruits learn skills specific to their job.

In the third phase, called "instruction in formation" (German: Verbandsausbildung; French: Instruction en formation; Italian: Istruzione di reparto), battlegroups and battalions are formed.

== United Kingdom ==
British armed forces recruits train in two phases. The length of Phase 1 recruit training varies according to service and trade. The British Army Phase 1 training, for other ranks in capbadges other than infantry, lasts 14 weeks. Infantry units of the British Army undergo a combined 28 weeks basic training, with the exception of the Parachute Regiment (30 weeks), Guards Regiments (30 weeks) and the Royal Gurkha Rifles (36 weeks).

The Royal Air Force provides 10 weeks of basic training for all other rank (US: enlisted) recruits, regardless of trade, and is delivered at RAF Halton.

The Royal Navy provides 10 weeks of basic recruit training for all other rank recruits, with the exception of the Royal Marines, delivered at HMS Raleigh. The Royal Marines (excluding the Royal Marines band), undertake 32 weeks of basic training, delivered at Commando Training Centre Royal Marines.

Phase One is initial recruit training designed to bring all recruits to a similar standard of basic military ability. Upon completion of Phase 1 training, recruits (with the exception of Army infantry roles, and the Royal Marine Commandos) will progress to their trade specific Phase Two training, which consists of courses of varying duration to prepare recruits for their assigned role.

Officer recruits into the UK Armed Forces undergo the following Basic training:

- British Army - 44 weeks, delivered at Royal Military Academy (RMA) in Sandhurst.
- Royal Air Force - 24 weeks, delivered at RAF College Cranwell (MIOTC).
- Royal Navy - 30 weeks (split into two equal phases of 15 weeks each), delivered at Britannia Royal Naval College (BRNC) in Dartmouth.
- Royal Marines - 15 months, delivered at Commando Training Centre Royal Marines, with 3 weeks towards the end of the course in the United States.

Upon completion of their Officer recruit training, cadets will then progress to their trade specific training of varying length.

The British Army, Royal Navy, Royal Marines and Royal Air Force manage their own Phase One and Phase Two training establishments.

== United States ==
In the United States, recruit training in the U.S. Army is called Basic Combat Training (BCT); U.S. Army Combat Arms MOS (11 Series, 19 series, 13 series, 12 series) and Military Police MOS (31 series) undergo One Station Unit Training (OSUT) which involves BCT, Advanced Individual Training (AIT) and Specialized Training (such as Bradley, or Mortar School, or Gunnery) all in one. In the U.S. Air and Space Forces it is called Basic Military Training (BMT). In the U.S. Navy, U.S. Marine Corps and U.S. Coast Guard it is called "Recruit Training" (commonly known as Boot Camp).

Some services present a badge or other award to denote completion of recruit training. The Army typically issues the Army Service Ribbon (issued after completion of Advanced Individual Training), and the Air Force presents the Air Force Training Ribbon and the Airman's Coin. The Marine Corps issue the Eagle, Globe, and Anchor once initial training is complete to signify that the recruits are now Marines. The Navy replaces the "RECRUIT" ball cap the recruits have worn throughout training with the "NAVY" ball cap upon successful completion of "Battle Stations". The United States Coast Guard's recruit training graduates place a Coast Guard Medallion on their ball cap.

For honor graduates of basic training, the Air Force, Coast Guard, and Navy present a Basic Training Honor Graduate Ribbon. The Navy and Marine Corps often meritoriously advance the top graduates of each division one pay-grade (up to a maximum of E-3).

=== U.S. Army ===
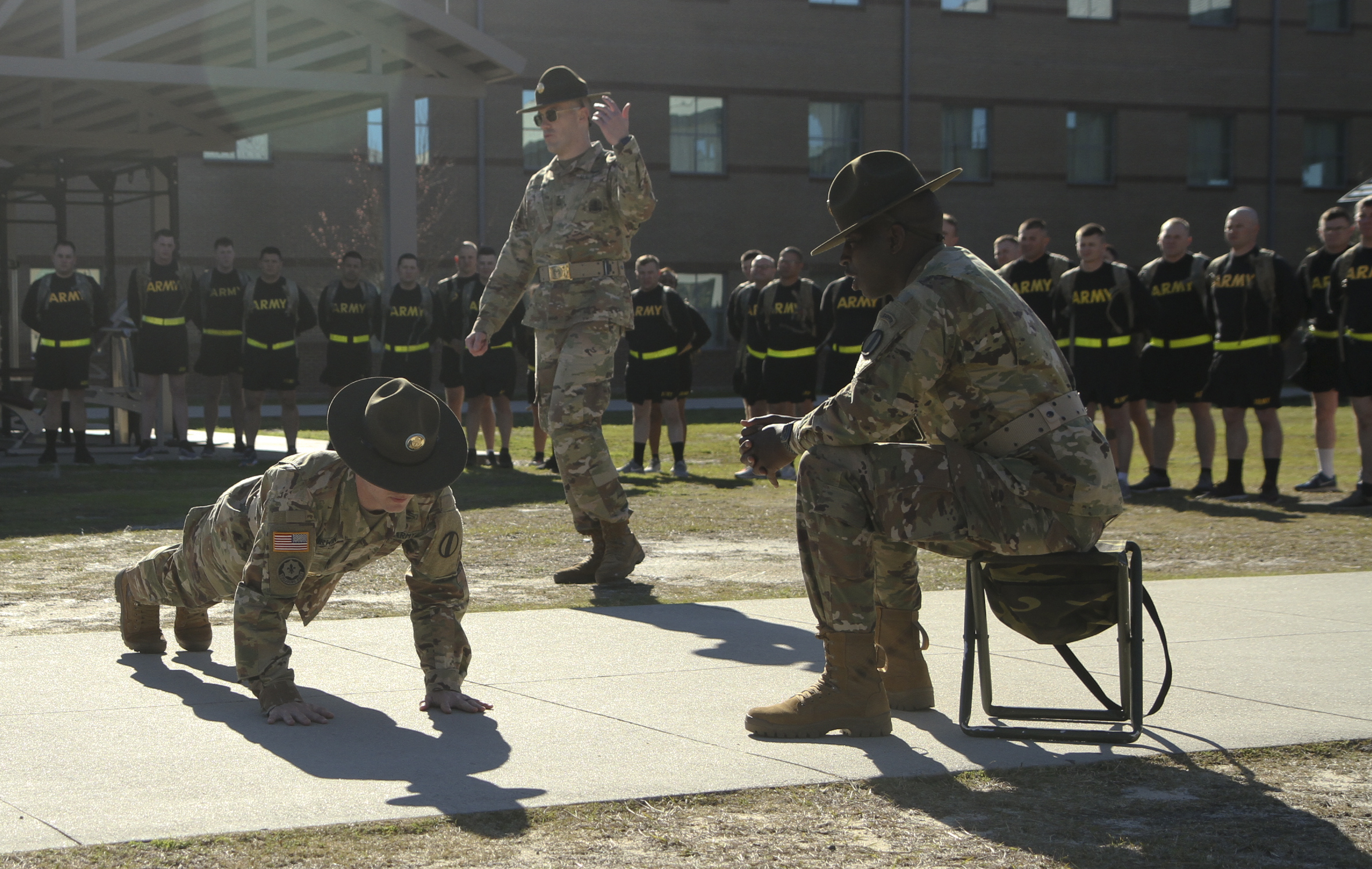
U.S. Army recruits being instructed

In the United States Army, recruits are sent to Basic Combat Training in a location designated according to the military Military Occupational Specialty, or MOS, which is selected upon enlistment.

Initial Entry Training (IET) is divided into two parts, which commonly take place at two different locations, depending on the chosen MOS:

- Basic Combat Training, or BCT, is a ten-week training cycle. This period does not include "Reception Week" during which recruits are being slotted to their training companies (troops for cavalry). During reception, trainees get Sexual Harassment/Assault Response & Prevention training during IET, as of 30 July 2021.
- Advanced Individual Training, or AIT, is where new soldiers receive specific training in their chosen MOS. The length of AIT training varies depending on the MOS and can last anywhere from four weeks to nearly one year.
- Several MOSs (mainly combat arms) combine both basic training and AIT in a single combined course called One Station Unit Training (OSUT), which can last up to 22 weeks. The attitude and environment remain the same throughout the entire training cycle, including drill instructors. Essentially, OSUT is an extended version of Basic Training, especially for Infantry OSUT, which remains on the same basic soldiering tasks for the entire cycle, although in greater detail. Infantry OSUT is conducted at the United States Army Infantry School at Fort Benning, and is 22 weeks long.

The U.S. Army has four sites for BCT:

- Fort Benning at Columbus, Georgia
- Fort Jackson at Columbia, South Carolina
- Fort Leonard Wood at St. Robert, Missouri
- Fort Sill at Lawton, Oklahoma

During Basic Combat Training, Army recruits learn a variety of basic combat skills including: Basic Rifle Marksmanship (BRM), land navigation, patrolling, securing and defending a position, drill and ceremony, fireteam formations and assaults, communications and use of AN/PRC-119 radio, combat lifesaving skills, 9-line medevac, reporting intelligence, hand grenades, Claymore mines, M203/M320 grenade launcher, M249 Squad Automatic Weapon (SAW), M240B machine gun, M2 .50 caliber machine gun, MK-19, and AT-4 anti-tank weapon. Training also includes combat conditioning by running an obstacle course, the Confidence Course, conducting marches of varying distances up to 12 miles, physical training, and Modern Army Combatives Program (MACP), a martial arts program based on the combination of Brazilian jiu-jitsu, wrestling, judo, Muay Thai, boxing, and a number of others. Recruits are trained to adopt the Army "Warrior Ethos", and to memorize and live by the Soldier's Creed.

BCT is divided into three phases. During Phase I, (also known as "Red Phase") recruits are subject to "Total Control," meaning their every action is monitored and constantly corrected by drill sergeants. The first week of training is commonly referred to as "Hell Week," due to the intense period of adjustment required on the part of the new recruits. Marches are common throughout basic training. Recruits are sent to the "gas chamber" during Phase I, as part of training for defensive chemical warfare. They are also introduced to their standard-issue weapon, the M16A2 rifle, the M16A4 rifle, or M4 carbine.

In Phase II (also known as "White Phase") soldiers begin actually firing weapons, starting with the rifle or carbine (M4A1). Other weapons the recruit becomes familiarized with include various grenades (such as the M67 fragmentation grenade) and grenade launchers (such as the M203). Recruits are then familiarized with the bayonet, anti-tank/armor weaponry and other heavy weapons. The course also includes an obstacle course which the soldiers are expected to negotiate in a certain amount of time. Additionally, Phase II includes continual, intense PT, along with drill and ceremony training. At the conclusion of Phase II, Soldiers are to demonstrate proficiency with the various weaponry with which they trained.

Phase III or "Blue Phase," is the culmination and the most challenging of all the training phases. A final PT test is administered during the first week. Recruits who fail are frequently retested, often up until the morning of their cycle's graduation. If they do not pass, then they are recycled to another platoon that is in an earlier phase of the training cycle until they meet the fitness standards. The final PT Test is the Army Physical Fitness Test (APFT). Usually, a soldier needs to score at least 60 points in each APFT category (pushups, planks, and 2 mile run) to pass, but in Basic Combat Training, only 50 points are required; the soldier will nevertheless take another APFT with a 60-point requirement at AIT. During Blue Phase, the recruits move on to such longer and more intensive "bivouac" and FTX (Field Training Exercises) as nighttime combat operations. Drill sergeants will make much of this an adversarial process by working against the recruits in many of the night operations and trying to foil plans, etc.

Upon completion of Basic Combat Training, a recruit is now a soldier, and has developed skills to operate in a combat environment, as a basic rifleman and to perform his or her MOS-specific duties under fire.

=== U.S. Marine Corps ===
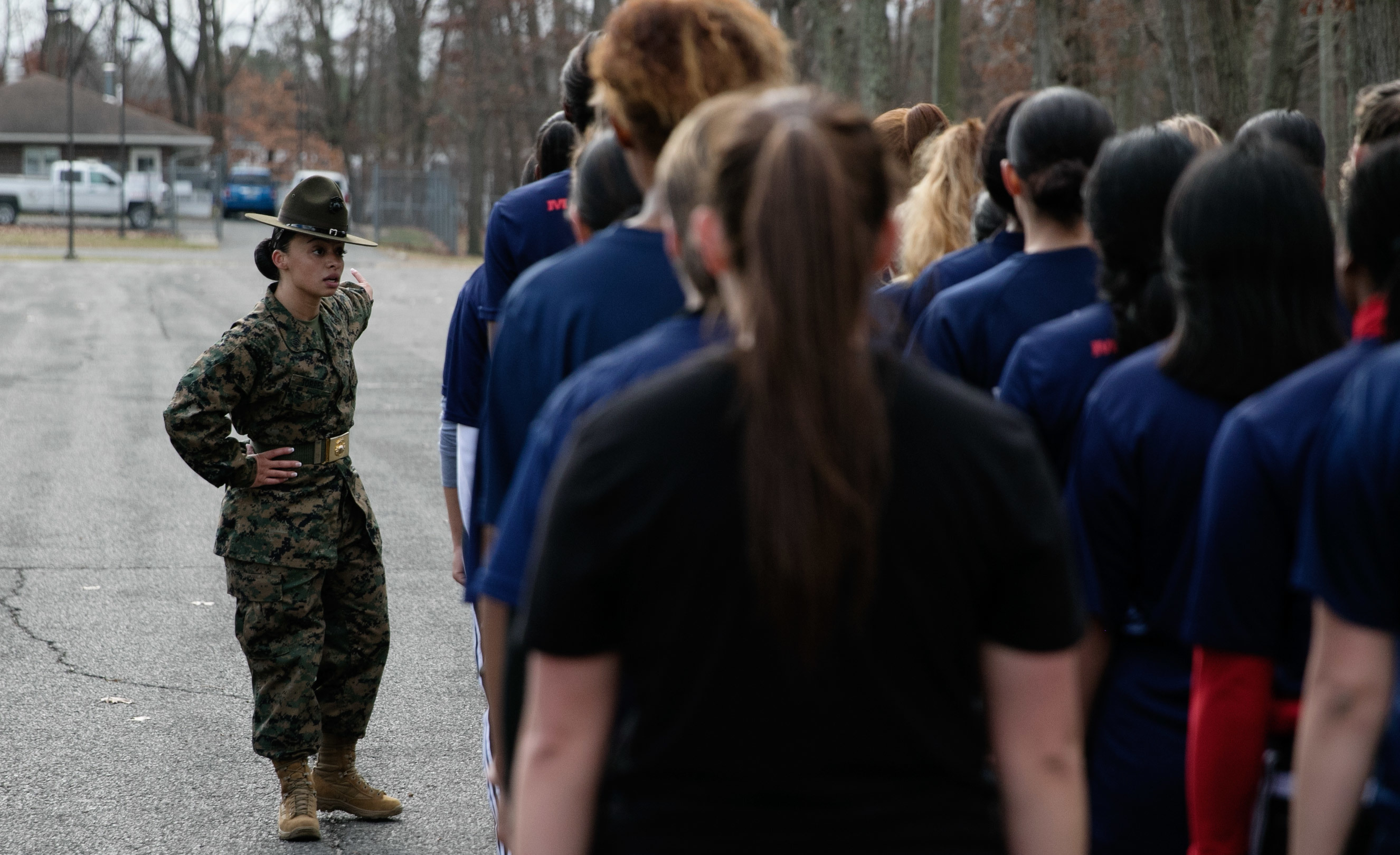
A U.S. Marine Corps Drill Instructor works with enlistees, or individuals who have not left yet for recruit training. U.S. Marine Corps photo by Sgt. Kate Busto/Released

The United States Marine Corps Recruit Depots are located at Marine Corps Recruit Depot Parris Island, South Carolina, and Marine Corps Recruit Depot San Diego, California. Men and women go to either, depending on whether they were recruited east or west of the Mississippi River. Until 2021, women only trained at Parris Island. Marine Corps boot camp is the longest basic training, excluding Army One Station Unit Training (OSUT), in-processing & out-processing is included unlike the other branches as the other branches do not contain this in their Basic Training duration length. Formerly, recruits were referred to as either "(the) private(s)" or "(the) recruit(s)" from day one of Recruit Training. Since the 1990s, they are referred to as "(the) recruit(s)" alone until they earn the title of Marine.

Marine Corps Recruit Training (MCRT) is a 13-week program that is divided up into three four-week phases and further broken down into individual training days. While there are 69 individual training days, recruits also go through pre- and post-training processing where recruits are afforded relatively little freedom. Phase one mainly consists of learning recruit life protocol, physical training, MCMAP training, academic classes, initial drill, a series inspection, and the confidence course. West coast recruits also do swim qualification during this phase. Phase two is completely in the field at Camp Pendleton for west coast recruits, with the first two weeks being spent on marksmanship training and qualification with the M16A4 service rifle, and the last week in the field learning skills such as fireteam formations, land navigation, and hikes. For east coast recruits, phase two is swim qualification, rifle qualification, and Team Week, a week of maintenance duties for the island as a show of how to perform base support tasks while still keeping military bearing and attention to detail. Phase three brings the San Diego recruits back to the recruit depot where they finish up with final drill, final inspection, more PT and confidence courses, and graduation. During third phase, west coast recruits also go back into the field one last time to do the Crucible event. Parris Island recruits finish with field training, final drill and inspection, the Crucible, and graduation. Note that recruits going to either depot receive exactly the same training, if in a different order. An important part of this process is training recruits to adopt and live by the motto, "Every Marine a rifleman".

Upon completion, recruits proceed to receive further training at the School of Infantry (SOI). All non-infantry MOS Marines are trained at the Marine Combat Training Battalion (MCT), while infantry MOS Marines are trained at the Infantry Training Battalion (ITB).

MCT and ITB training is conducted at one of two locations, SOI-East at Camp Lejeune in Jacksonville, North Carolina (for Parris Island graduates) and SOI-West at Camp Pendleton in San Diego, California (for San Diego graduates).

Marine Combat Training Battalion (MCT) is a 29-day course. Marines learn the basics of combat marksmanship, counter-improvised explosive device techniques, how to conduct the defense of a position, convoy operations, combat formations, fireteam assaults, patrolling, urban warfare, use of the AN/PRC-119 radio, reporting military intelligence, land navigation, and the use of hand grenades, the M203 grenade launcher, M249 Squad Automatic Weapon, and M240 machine gun. Training also includes combat conditioning by running an obstacle course, conducting marches, physical training, and Marine Corps Martial Arts Program. Upon completion of Marine Combat Training, the Marine is to have gained the knowledge and ability to operate in a combat environment as a basic rifleman and to perform his or her primary duties under fire. (The main contrast with Army recruit training is that nearly identical training is integrated into Basic Combat Training, so there is no follow-on school.) Upon completion, Marines proceed to their MOS-specific school.

In Infantry Training Battalion (ITB), infantry MOS (03XX) Marines receive 59 days of training in infantry skills, including advanced marksmanship, combat patrolling, land navigation, and a wide array of other infantry skills. Upon completion of ITB, newly qualified Marine infantrymen proceed to their assigned units.

=== U.S. Navy ===
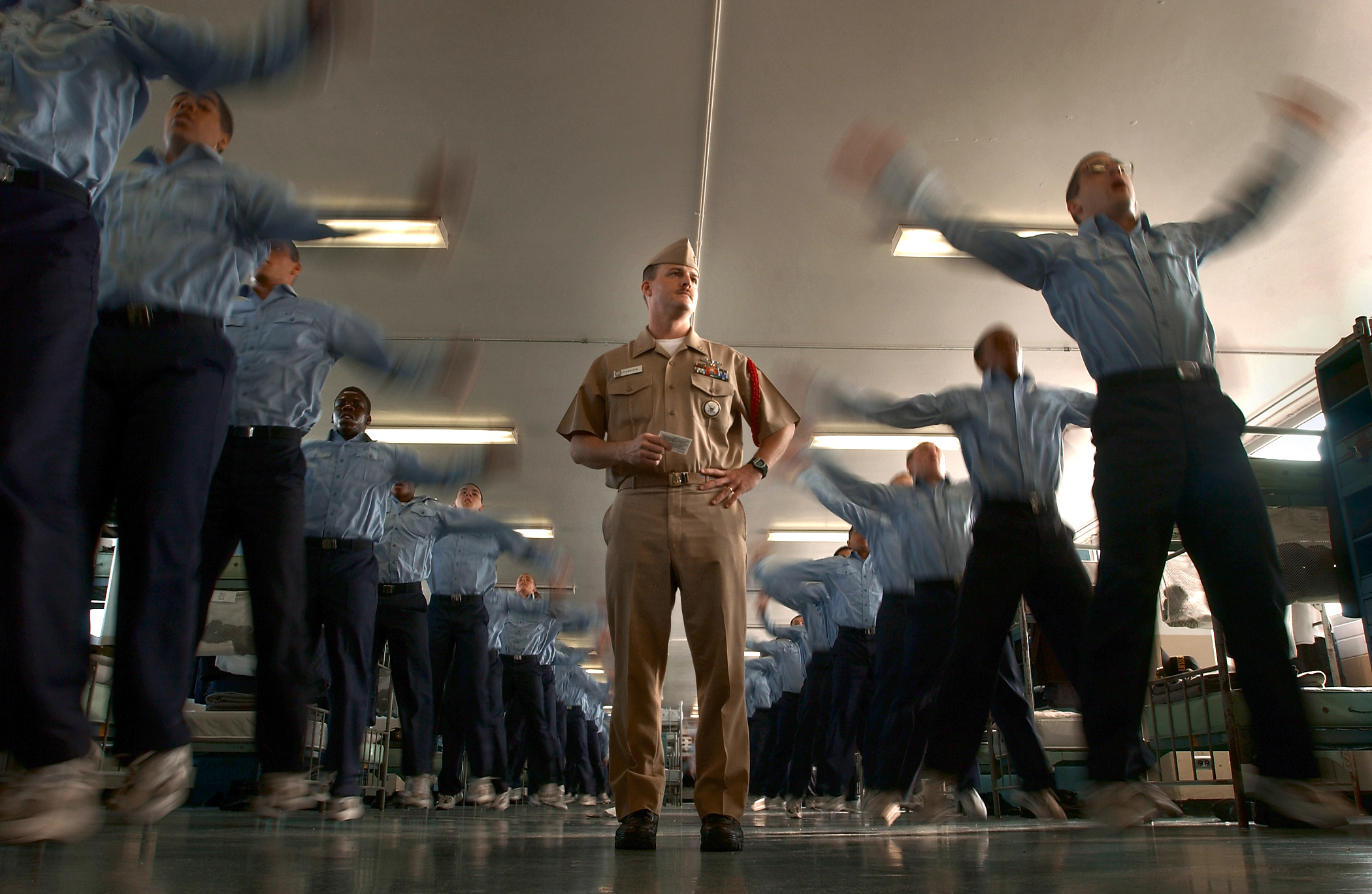
In March 2002, a U.S. Navy Recruit Division Commander conducts "Instructional Training" to correct substandard performance during boot camp.

The United States Navy currently operates boot camp at Recruit Training Command Great Lakes, located at Naval Station Great Lakes, near North Chicago, Illinois. Instead of having Drill Sergeants or Drill Instructors like other branches of the U.S. Armed Forces, the U.S. Navy has RDCs (Recruit Division Commanders) that are assigned to each division. Training lasts approximately eight weeks (although some recruits will spend as many as nine weeks in training due to the somewhat complicated processing cycle). Days are counted by a system that lists the week and day that they are on, for example, 7-3 for week 7 day 3. The first approximate week is counted P-1, P-2, etc. which denotes that it is a processing day and does not count as part of their 8-week training period. Recruits are instructed on military drill, watchstanding, basic seamanship, water survival skills, first aid, basic shipboard damage control, firefighting, shipboard communication, familiarization with the M18 Pistol (the Navy no longer gives instruction on the M16 or Mossberg 500 shotgun in boot camp), pass the confidence chamber (tear-gas-filled chamber), PT, and the basic essentials on Navy life. Recruits also attend many classes throughout boot camp on subjects such as Equal Opportunity, Sexual Assault Victim Intervention, Uniform Code of Military Justice, recognition of naval aircraft and vessels, U.S. naval history, and more. In order for recruits to pass boot camp, they are physically and mentally tested on a 12-hour exercise called Battle Stations which consists of 12 different scenarios involving firefighting, navigating smoke filled compartments, first-aid knowledge, survival at sea, mass casualties, shipboard flood control, bomb detection, and many other skills that they have been learning in the previous 7 weeks. After completion of boot camp, freshly minted sailors are sent either to various "A" Schools located across the United States—where they begin training to receive their ratings (jobs)—or to apprenticeship training, where they then enter the fleet without a designation.

The Navy formerly operated Recruit Training Centers in San Diego, California; Orlando, Florida; Meridian, Mississippi; and Port Deposit (Bainbridge), Maryland. From 1942 to 1946—during and immediately following World War II—the Navy had two additional training sites: Naval Training Station (USNTS) Sampson (renamed Sampson Air Force Base in 1950), near Seneca Lake, New York, where over 400,000 recruits were trained, and Farragut Naval Training Station in Bayview, Idaho.

=== U.S. Air and Space Forces ===
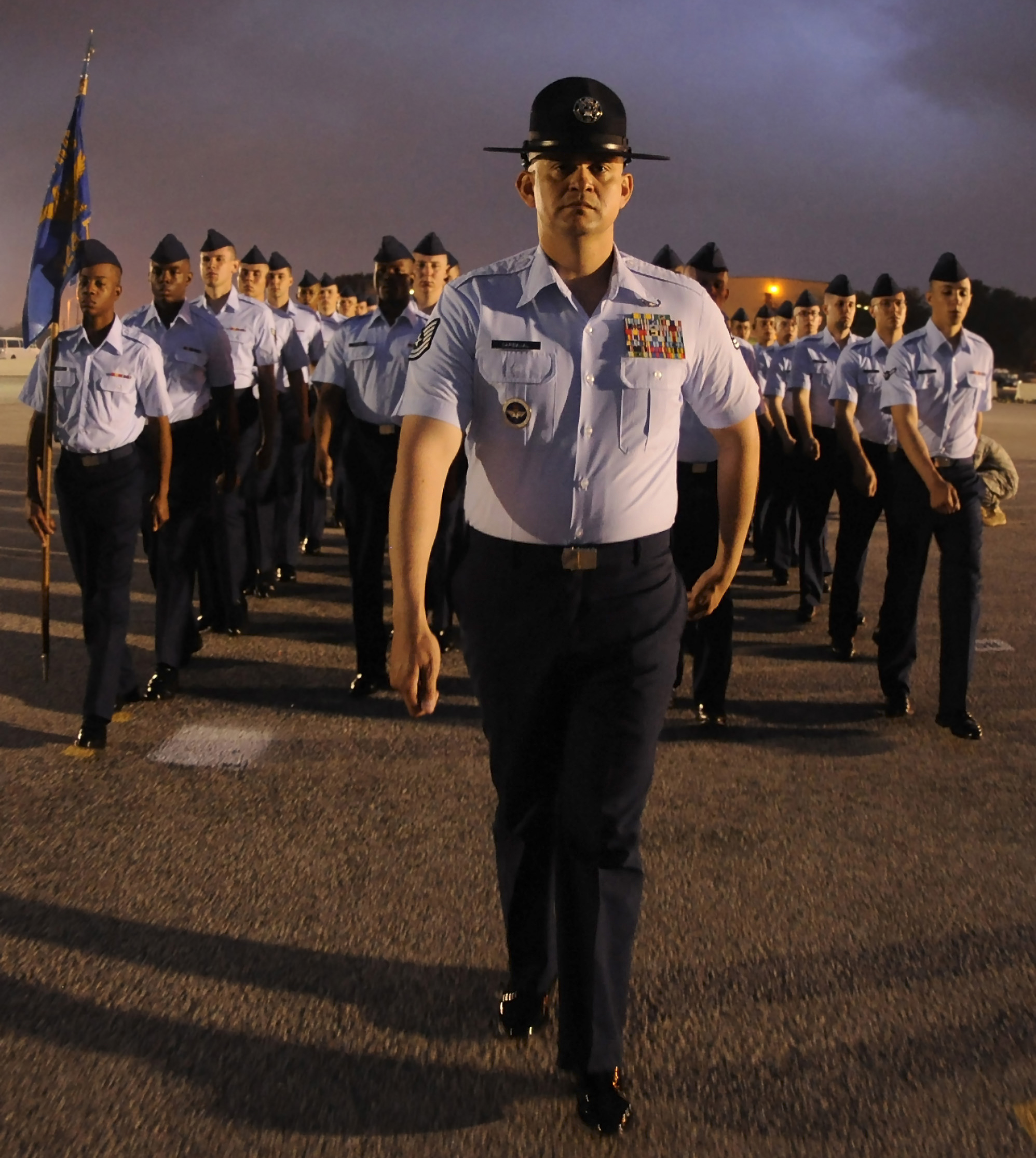
A formation of USAF airmen

The U.S. Air and Space Forces' Basic Military Training (BMT) is seven and a half weeks long, as they do not count the first week ("Week 0"). BMT is 63 calendar days long. It is conducted at Lackland Air Force Base in San Antonio, Texas. Formerly, trainees were referred to as "airman" from day one of BMT. This has been changed; now, personnel are referred to as trainees until the Airman's Coin Ceremony in the eighth week of training, when they receive their Airman's Coin. Trainees receive military instruction (including the Air Force core values, flight and individual drill, and living area inspections), academic classes (covering topics such as Air Force history, dress and appearance, military customs and courtesies, ethics, security, and alcohol/drug abuse prevention and treatment), and field training (including protection against biological and chemical attack, basic marksmanship on the M4 carbine as well as self-aid buddy care). Following BMT, airmen/guardians go to a technical school (or 'tech school') where they learn the specifics of their Air Force Specialty Code (AFSC), which is equivalent to the MOS (Military Occupational Specialty) in the Army and Marines, the Navy's NEC (Naval Enlisted Classification) code, or the Coast Guard's ratings.

All non-prior-service enlistees are required to complete BMT, including those enlisting in the Air National Guard and Air Force Reserve Command. Reserve component enlistees receive the same training as their active-duty counterparts. Credit can be given on a case-by-case basis for enlistees with college credit. Eagle Scouts and service in the Civil Air Patrol qualify for promotion to E-2 (airman) or E-3 (airman first class) upon graduation from BMT. The stripes are not worn until graduation, though trainees are paid at the higher pay grade.

Lackland AFB has been associated with BMT for almost the Air Force's entire history. From 1950 to 1956, 300,000 airmen received BMT at Sampson Air Force Base in New York. In 1951, Parks Air Force Base in Dublin, California, became a BMT center, with training beginning in March 1952. BMT at Parks AFB ceased later in the decade and the installation was transferred to the U.S. Army in 1959. For a brief time between 1966 and 1968, the Air Force operated a second BMT at Amarillo Air Force Base in Amarillo, Texas.

Unlike the Army and Navy, but like the Marine Corps (throughout boot camp) and Coast Guard (during the first section of boot camp), trainees are required to refer to all airmen and guardians of all ranks as "sir" or "ma'am". Trainees are required to preface speaking to military training instructors with their reporting statement: "Sir/Ma'am, Trainee (the recruit's surname) reports as ordered".

An additional two weeks of BMT was added to the program on November 1, 2008, extending the duration of BMT from six and a half weeks to eight and a half weeks. BMT has been tailored to incorporate some of the additional warfighting skills to coincide with increased Air Expeditionary Force (AEF) rotations and more frequent support of its sister services during those rotations. In 2015, BMT was shortened once again to seven and a half weeks. Trainees still stay at Lackland for eight and half weeks, however, the eighth week following graduation they are moved to a more relaxed environment under a program called Airman's Week, which is designed to transition trainees to technical training.

=== U.S. Coast Guard ===
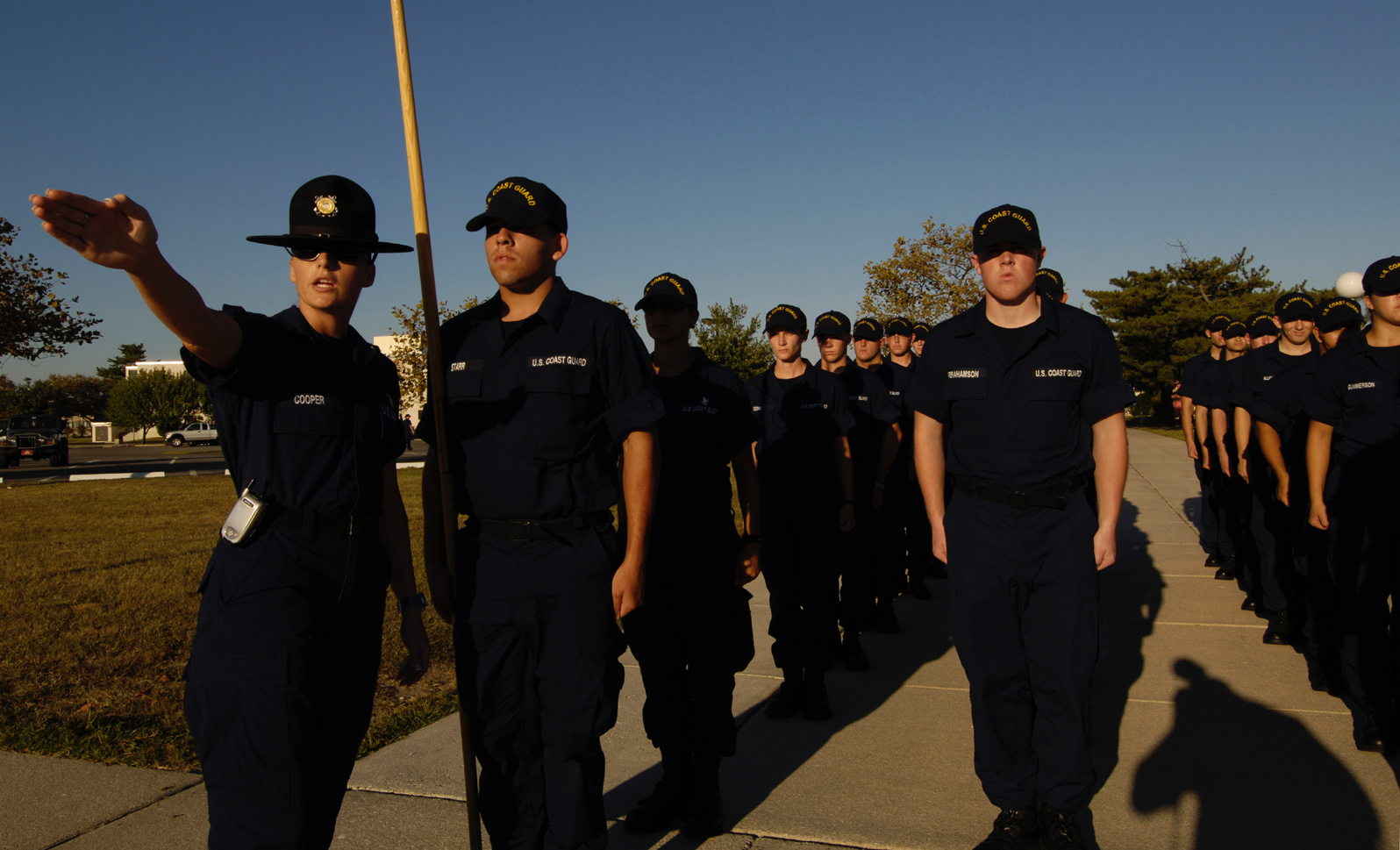
A U.S. Coast Guard Company Commander instructs a recruit during recruit training.

Recruit training for the U.S. Coast Guard is held at Coast Guard Training Center Cape May in Cape May, New Jersey. The Coast Guard base on Government Island (now known as Coast Guard Island) Alameda, California was also used as a second major recruit training center until it was closed in 1982. The official standard recruit training cycle lasts eight weeks. A limited number of recruits may face reversion to earlier weeks of training should they exhibit egregious deficiencies in attitude and/or aptitude.

As an alternate for those recruits possessing prior military service or civilian job skills, Coast Guard recruit basic training offers an abbreviated route to completion of basic training with the Direct Entry Petty Officer Training program (DEPOT) "The goal of the Direct Entry Petty Officer Training Course is to produce petty officers who on the basis of their civilian professions, prior military experience, or a combination of both" are otherwise duly qualified.

Coast Guard boot camp covers basic seamanship, drill, military bearing, and firefighting. The U.S. Coast Guard is unique among the armed services in that it fires the SIG Sauer P229R pistol as well as the M16 rifle during the training.

Although the Coast Guard is a part of the Department of Homeland Security, rather than the Department of Defense, it is by law and tradition a branch of the United States Armed Forces. As with all military personnel, coast guardsmen are subject to the Uniform Code of Military Justice (UCMJ). Due to the Coast Guard's unique mission set – including CONUS and OCONUS defense operations, search and rescue and maritime law enforcement – there are added requirements to maintain high physical fitness standards and military bearing. Due to its unusual, diverse and difficult mission, the U.S. Coast Guard is the most selective in recruiting and training standards. As an example, the Coast Guard Academy is the only service academy that uses competitive admissions for prospective officer candidates rather than congressional appointment.

During their time at Cape May, recruits are subjected to the usual "boot camp" atmosphere of direct instruction and intense motivation. Recruits must adhere to strict rules such as hygiene and uniform regulations and obey all lawful orders. The recruits are designated as seaman recruits (SR; E-1). Unique to the Coast Guard among the armed services, recruits successfully completing basic recruit training are advanced to the rank of seaman apprentice/fireman apprentice (SA/FA; E-2) or seaman/fireman (SN/FN; E-3) upon graduation—the difference generally based on the level of higher education the graduate possesses. Coast Guard drill instructors are called "company commanders" and hold a rank ranging from petty officer 2nd class (E-5) up to senior chief petty officer (E-8). Coast Guard companies have approximately two or three company commanders and anywhere from 20 to over 100 recruits.

After completing boot camp, recruits can select their rating and then attend an "A" school. Few graduates go straight to "A" school; most spend up to a year in the fleet as "non-rates". "A" school is a long-term technical school providing specific instruction about a rating. The "A" schools last two to six months and usually occur at TRACEN Yorktown, Yorktown, Virginia or TRACEN Petaluma, Petaluma, California. Aviation related ratings train at the Aviation Technical Training Center at Coast Guard Air Station Elizabeth City, North Carolina. Some ratings have an available on-the-job apprenticeship training option known as "striking" instead of attending an "A" school.

== See also ==
- Military education and training
- Military academy
- Officer Candidate School
- Resocialization
- Psychological conditioning
- Military recruitment
- Military service
