= NAPFA =

NAPFA may stand for:

- National Association of Personal Financial Advisors, an American organization created to aid the field of fee-only financial planning
- National Physical Fitness Award, part of Singapore's "Sports For Life" programme
