= Trim and Fit =

Former weight loss programme for Singapore schools

The Trim and Fit (TAF) programme was a weight loss programme that targeted child obesity in Singapore schools between 1992 and 2007. Introduced by the Ministry of Education, schoolchildren under the programme were educated on nutrition, calorie control, and participated in intense physical exercise and activities.

== Overview ==
Overall, the programme was successful in reducing the obesity rate amongst schoolchildren from 14% to 9.8% by 2002. However, it came at a psychological cost of participants being stigmatised and in some cases, reportedly diagnosed with eating disorders. The TAF programme has since been replaced by the Holistic Health Framework (HHF) which includes all schoolchildren.

== The programme ==
The TAF programme was introduced into schools in 1992 as part of the National Healthy Lifestyle Campaign. It was a result of a 1991 review of the nation's health plan by a national committee. Students aged 9 to pre-tertiary education were required to undergo annual BMI measurements and National Physical Fitness Award test (a precursor fitness test similar to Individual Physical Proficiency Test for National Servicemen). The country's population at that time was showing an increase in obesity that became associated with health problems and loss of manpower for male conscripts in National Service, which caused many conscripts to be deemed unfit for deployment into combat service.

The programme was deemed by observers as an interventionist measure, requiring students who were deemed overweight to be subject to additional intense exercises or physical activities for at least one and a half hours per week. These activities were organised during recess or at times set aside before or after lessons at schools' discretion. They were also issued with "calorie cash" – food ration coupons from which no more than a certain number of calories may be purchased and consumed in a recess break. The amount of calorie cash was inversely proportional to the child's obesity rate. Children which exceeded the 160% of the ideal BMI were referred to the Health Promotion Board for follow-up action.

A direct impact of the TAF programme was a reduction of the obesity rate of schoolchildren from 14% to 9.8% by 2002. Worldwide public health experts have evaluated the TAF model for possible replication around the world.

A carrot-and-stick approach was adopted in putting pressure on schools to meet the targets of fitness and obesity set by the ministry. Cash incentives were awarded by the ministry to schools that exceeded fitness targets and created new strategies to maintain students' obesity levels. Schools that failed had to face "consultation" sessions with ministry officials. Schools were also ranked annually based on how well targets were met at national level. Schools were given a wide discretion in determining how TAF was to be implemented, which resulted in some schools going so far as to implement apartheid-like segregation – for instance, where children were grouped to sit at normal and overweight tables during recess.

== Psychological factors ==
Psychological motivation and peer pressure was emphasised in implementation of the programme, which formed the bulk of criticism of the programme as being insensitive and heavy-handed. Several TAF participants reported experiences of stigmatization, teasing, physiological stress and lower self-esteem as they found themselves being singled out for being obese. It was also quickly pointed out that the name of the programme contained a negative connotation, as its anadrome was 'FAT'. Despite such criticism, education officials continually insisted that the programme was not out to stigmatise overweight children.

In 2005, a National University of Singapore study of 4,400 schoolgirls linked TAF to an increase in eating disorders. It found that girls were more likely to have poorer relationship with their parents and their female friends. The findings correlated to a Singapore General Hospital study released a week earlier which found that instances of anorexia nervosa and bulimia increased six-fold from 1994 to 2002. The Ministry of Education quickly rejected these findings; claiming TAF was not a factor in the increase in anorexia.

Two years later, in 2007, the Ministry of Education decided to replace TAF with the Holistic Health Framework (HHF). The HHF intended to ensure the fitness and health of all school children.
