= Individual physical proficiency test =

Singaporean physical fitness test

The Individual Physical Proficiency Test (IPPT) is a standard physical fitness test used by the Singapore Armed Forces (SAF), Singapore Police Force (SPF) and Singapore Civil Defence Force (SCDF) to assess the basic components of physical fitness and motor skills of their members. The IPPT is applicable to all eligible persons with National Service (NS) liability, including Full-Time National Servicemen (NSFs), Operationally-Ready National Servicemen (NSmen, or reservists), and regulars. The test presently consists of three stations: sit-up, push-up, and 2.4 km (1.5 mi) run. Based on their age, sex and vocation, participants are required to meet certain standards under the IPPT Standards and Scoring System in order to pass the test. As of October 2013, about 116,000 people take the IPPT every year. Personnel who have a Physical Employment Standards (PES) status of B3/4, C or E are exempt from taking the IPPT.

== History ==
When National Service was first introduced in Singapore in 1967, the physical fitness test included a 4.8 km (3.0 mi) run to be completed within 30 minutes, and the completion of a 9.6 km (6.0 mi) run within 70 minutes while wearing the skeletal battle order (a type of load-bearing equipment). In 1979, this test was replaced by the IPPT, which included five stations: push-up, sit-up, chin-up, half-knee bend and a 2.4 km (1.5 mi) run. The half-knee bend component was removed in 1981.

The current IPPT format was adapted from the National Physical Fitness Assessment (NAPFA) test protocol developed by the Singapore Sports Council and launched in 1982. Its standards were derived from a NAPFA study, in which the results were scientifically compiled and standardized. to fairly address the various physical fitness abilities of different age groups. Prior to 2015, the IPPT consisted of five stations: sit-up, standing broad jump, chin-up, 4 x 10 m shuttle run and 2.4 km (1.5 mi) run.

On 1 April 2011, the Enhanced NS IPPT system for NSmen was implemented, incorporating principles of physical training science to help servicemen train more effectively and giving them greater flexibility in managing their training schedules.

In late 2013, the Ministry of Defence announced that it was considering implementing key changes to the IPPT system to put it in line with the fitness tests used in the Australian Defence Force and United States Armed Forces. Some of these changes include: removing the standing broad jump station; adding push-up as a test criterion; extending the distance of the current 2.4 km (1.5 mi) run to 3.2 km (2.0 mi).

On 23 July 2014, Defence Minister Ng Eng Hen mentioned in a post on Facebook that the IPPT will be reduced from five stations to three: The standing broad jump, chin-up, and 4 x 10 m shuttle run stations will be removed – with the sit-up station and 2.4 km (1.5 mi) run kept intact – and a new station, push-up, will be added. The details of the scoring system of the new IPPT were announced by the Ministry of Defence on 24 July. Under this new scoring system, a person has to accumulate a minimum total number of points from all three stations to pass or qualify for the Gold, Silver or Pass with Incentive standard. The revised IPPT format was introduced in 2015.

== Application ==
The IPPT is applicable to all NSFs, NSmen and regulars who hold the Physical Employment Standards (PES) status of A, B/B1 or B2/C1. All IPPT-eligible servicemen and servicewomen are assigned IPPT windows based on their birthdays. The window opens on his/her birthday and closes on the day before his/her next birthday.

The IPPT Standards and Scoring System are based on a person's age, sex and vocation. IPPT-eligible persons are grouped based on their birthdays into six different age categories (X, Y, Y1, Z, Z1, Z2/V) ranging from below 25 years old to 49 years old. There are four IPPT vocation groupings: Commandos/Divers; Guards; Combat; Service. The Scoring System awards grades and points to the raw scores obtained by the person at each of the three test stations. Participants are required to obtain a minimum grade for each station and accumulate a minimum total number of points for all stations in order to pass the IPPT. Based on his/her score, the person may be awarded the Gold, Silver or Pass standard, and may receive a monetary incentive accordingly.

=== NSFs and regulars ===
NSFs and regulars are required to attempt the IPPT at least once in every IPPT window which follows the 31 March – 1 April work year. For certain vocations, such as Commandos and Divers, personnel are required to obtain the Gold standard in the IPPT. To qualify for admission to the Officer Cadet School or Specialist Cadet School, recruits undergoing Basic Military Training have to obtain either a Gold or Silver standard in the IPPT before they pass out – in addition to fulfilling other requirements.

=== NSmen ===
NSmen are required to take their IPPT annually within a window starting from their birthday and closing on the day before their next birthday. This requirement continues until they are posted to the Ministry of Defence Reserves or when they are medically downgraded to a Physical Employment Standards (PES) status of C2 or below.

Before 1 September 2014, NSmen had to attempt the IPPT at least once within the first nine months of their IPPT window. They could complete their IPPT during their annual In-Camp Training (reservist training), or at another timing during the nine-month period at any of the various test centres around Singapore. NSmen were allowed to attempt the IPPT as many times as they wished, provided they had not already achieved the Gold standard. In addition, NSmen were only compensated for their first three attempts. Based on the former IPPT Gazette under the Enlistment Act (dated 26 May 2006), NSmen who did not attempt or did not pass the IPPT within the first nine months of their IPPT window had to attend and complete 20 Remedial Training sessions within the last three months of their IPPT window at any Singapore Armed Forces Fitness and Conditioning Centre.

Before 1 September 2014, NSmen were also allowed to attend a voluntary IPPT Preparatory Training scheme consisting of 10 sessions within the first nine months of their IPPT window. Under the initial version of the scheme, they had to meet certain Personal Performance Targets, similar to the IPPT Standards, before the 10th session in order to be exempted from Remedial Training. If they did not complete all 10 sessions, they had to attend and complete the 20 sessions of Remedial Training in the last three months of their IPPT window. If they completed all 10 IPPT Preparatory Training sessions but did not meet the Personal Performance Targets, they had to attend eight sessions of Remedial Training instead. The IPPT Preparatory Training scheme has since been further updated so that NSmen only need to complete 10 sessions to clear their IPPT requirement for the year regardless of whether they meet their Personal Performance Targets or not. Even if they fail to meet their Personal Performance Targets after the 10 sessions, they no longer need to attend additional sessions of Remedial Training.

Since 30 May 2011, all IPPT-eligible NSmen of the age of 35 or above are required to undergo a compulsory medical examination every year to ensure that they are medically fit to take the IPPT.

Starting from 1 September 2014, NSmen are allowed to attempt and pass the IPPT throughout the entire one-year IPPT window instead of only within the first nine months. They could also complete their 10-session IPPT Preparatory Training or 20-session Remedial Training within the one-year IPPT window as well, instead of only within the last three months. The monetary incentives for achieving Gold, Silver and Pass with Incentive standards have also been increased.

NSmen who do not attempt their IPPT are subject to disciplinary action, in addition to having to complete 20 sessions of Remedial Training in their next IPPT window unless they pass the IPPT before the 20 sessions are up. NSmen who fail to complete the 20-session Remedial Training face disciplinary action too.

== IPPT Badge ==
The IPPT Badge is awarded to Singapore Armed Forces, Singapore Civil Defence Force and Singapore Prison Service personnel who have obtained a Gold or Silver standard in the IPPT. It comes in the form of a badge or pin to be attached to the left sleeve of the uniform. The badge or pin is in the shape of a stick figure in a running pose enclosed in a circle. The Gold standard achiever's badge has a star beside the stick figure while the Silver one does not. The Singapore Civil Defence Force and Singapore Prison Service's version has a stick figure in a running pose against a Gold or Silver background.

== See also ==
- National Physical Fitness Award
