= Jehovah's Witnesses in Singapore =

The Bible Student movement from which Jehovah's Witnesses developed has been present in Singapore since 1912, although their right to practise and propagate their religion, as enshrined in Article 15 of the Constitution of Singapore, is not absolute. The Singapore Congregation of Jehovah's Witnesses was deregistered as a society in 1972, although the movement had a resurgence in the 1990s under the banner of the International Bible Students Association. Many Witnesses have been fined for possessing religious publications and meeting in public, while others have been imprisoned for refusing to be conscripted into the Singapore Armed Forces.

== History ==
The Watch Tower Bible and Tract Society of Pennsylvania—originally formed in 1881 in association with the Bible Student movement but later associated with Jehovah's Witnesses—began its operations in Singapore in 1912, when the country was still under British rule. On 17 January 1941, all publications by the Watch Tower Society of Pennsylvania were banned, as a result of Jehovah's Witnesses' persistent refusal to enlist in the Allied Forces during World War II.

In 1960, Jehovah's Witnesses were officially registered as a society under the Societies Ordinance 1890, but on 14 January 1972, the Singapore Congregation of Jehovah's Witnesses was deregistered for being "prejudicial to public welfare and order", with their refusal to take part in mandatory military service being cited as an aggravating factor. According to the Ministry of Home Affairs, there were around three hundred Jehovah's Witnesses in the country at the time.

Since the deregistration of the Singapore Congregation of Jehovah's Witnesses, all Witnesses who refuse to serve in the military—around six men annually—have faced imprisonment under the Enlistment Act 1970, but none of these men have incurred permanent criminal records as of 2021. During a parliamentary debate on conscription in Singapore, Minister of Trade and Industry Lee Hsien Loong noted that Jehovah's Witnesses had "great courage of conviction":

... each year a few dozen young men who are Jehovah's Witnesses have to be court-martialled because they refuse to do national service and they are sentenced to detention... After two years they are released. The enlistment order is served upon them again, they refuse again, we court-martial them again, they go and serve a second period of detention until, after two periods, we say, "Well, we call it quits. That is equivalent to your having served national service."

Jehovah's Witnesses experienced a resurgence in the 1990s, when they began to operate under the International Bible Students Association. In 1994, there were some 2,000 Jehovah's Witnesses in the country, most of whom were aged between 20 and 50. The maximum penalty for attending a meeting of an unlawful society at the time was three years' imprisonment and a S$3,000 fine. On 2 July 1992, four Jehovah's Witnesses—Colin Chan Hiang Leng, Aw Lee Eng, Isaiah Pandapotan Tampubolon, and Wan Kum Seng—were found guilty of possessing banned Watch Tower Society publications and were each handed fines ranging from S$400 to S$800.

On 24 February 1995 at 20:50 local time, as part of what was codenamed "Operation Hope", the Singapore Police Force raided four residences in Marsiling Crescent, Braddell Hill, Sims Avenue, and Saujana Road that served as regular meeting points for Jehovah's Witnesses. Numerous banned Watch Tower Society and International Bible Students' Association publications were seized and 69 Witnesses were arrested. Between November and December 1995, 62 of the 69 arrested Witnesses were tried for and found guilty of attending illegal gatherings. They were all fined, although many elected to be imprisoned instead.

== Legal challenges ==
In Chan Hiang Leng Colin and others v. Minister for Information and the Arts (1994), the High Court declined to recognise Jehovah's Witnesses as a "religious minority" whose rights were protected under Article 152(1) of the Constitution (Note: Article 152(1) of the Constitution of Singapore: "It shall be the responsibility of the Government constantly to care for the interests of the racial and religious minorities in Singapore.") since they were a banned organisation. Jehovah's Witnesses are only allowed to worship and practise their faith in private, and they are not allowed to meet in public, publish any literature or own any copies of publications, such as the New World Translation.

Moreover, the right to practise or propagate one's religion in Singapore, as set forth in Article 15(1) of the Constitution, is not absolute. The Court of Appeal affirmed in Chan (1996) that the religious beliefs of male Jehovah's Witnesses in the country could not exempt them from conscription into the Singapore Armed Forces. At the same time, it argued that "A citizen's right to profess, practise, or propagate his religious beliefs, even as (a) Jehovah's Witness, has not been taken away. It is the manner of carrying out these activities that is circumscribed by the relevant orders." It concluded that national service was a "fundamental tenet" and that "religious beliefs and practices which run counter to ... the sovereignty, integrity, and unity of Singapore ... must be restrained." Canadian Queen's Counsel Glen How opined on the apellants' behalf that Jehovah's Witnesses in Singapore had been too severely punished; Chief Justice Yong Pung How remarked that How "lived in a cartoon world".

On 1 November 1994, Peter Williams Nappalli, a teacher at the Institute of Technical Education (ITE), was fired for repeatedly refusing to recite the national pledge or sing the national anthem at school because of his beliefs as a Jehovah's Witness. Nappalli subsequently sued the ITE for wrongful dismissal but his claim was rejected by the High Court on 22 October 1998. The Court of Appeal dismissed his appeal a year later and argued that his actions were not religious, but "philosophical", and that they "(distorted) secular fact into religious belief". It further maintained that he had no right to constitutional protection under Article 15, since "Article 15 taken as a whole demonstrates that the paramount concern of the Constitution is a statement of citizen's rights framed in a wider social context of maintaining unity as one nation." In the court's view, the appellant's actions demonstrated a lack of "allegiance to the nation" and therefore jeopardised national unity.

In Pte Chai Tshun Chieh v. Chief Military Prosecutor (1998), the Military Court of Appeal convicted the accused of wilful disobedience of a lawful order. The accused, a Jehovah's Witness, had refused to put on a military uniform, carry arms, or participate in any military training, based on his belief that these actions violated God's laws.

== See also ==
- Religion in Singapore
- Jehovah's Witnesses and governments
