= National Association of Personal Financial Advisors =

American financial planning trade organization

- Abbreviation: NAPFA
- Formation: 1983; 43 years ago
- Type: Financial planning, trade organization
- Purpose: Professional association promoting strictly fee-only financial advice
- Location: Chicago, United States
- Region served: United States
- Services: Professional membership
- Members: 3,500 (2018)
- Official language: English
- CEO: Kathryn Dattomo
- Website: napfa.org

National Association of Personal Financial Advisors (NAPFA) is an American financial planning trade organization created in 1983 to expand the use of fee-only financial advisors by individual consumers. NAPFA established the first set of professional standards for fee-only financial advisors and has updated them to reflect changes in industry practices.

NAPFA members are distinguished from other financial professionals in several ways. There are a number of strict conditions before a financial advisor can become a member. The key one is NAPFA members cannot accept compensation in any form from any source other than their clients. There are no exceptions. NAPFA believes that this minimizes potential conflict of interest between a financial planner and their clients. The combination of strict fee-only rules and a peer review have kept NAPFA's membership small compared to other professional financial planning organizations. As of December 1, 2018, NAPFA had approximately 3,500 members.

== History ==
The association was founded in 1983 when a group of advisors met at an independent advisor meeting in 1982 in Atlanta. They agreed that accepting commission created a direct conflict of interest with their clients and that this should be avoided. They wanted to provide high-quality, long-term financial planning but without the influence of commissions. After much discussion, in February 1983, NAPFA was born. The organization started with 125 financial planners.

By 2024, the membership had grown to over 4,400 registered financial advisors, associates and students.

== Fee-only ==
NAPFA defines a "fee-only" financial advisor as one who is compensated solely by the client, with neither the advisor nor any related party receiving compensation that is contingent on the purchase or sale of a financial product. This definition is in direct contrast to most advisors, who earn commissions, discounts, and other incentives when their clients purchase financial products. Also, unlike other financial planners, NAPFA members are required to clearly disclose the fee in advance.

However, NAPFA members differ on how they charge the fee. Some advisors charge an hourly rate, similar to an attorney or CPA. Rates vary by region of the country and an advisor's experience level and expertise. Some advisors charge a retainer fee schedule that is paid quarterly or annually. Other advisors charge based upon a percentage of the client's assets under management, such as a 1% fee on the assets per year. Regardless, the fee must be made clear to the client.

NAPFA does not permit its members to be compensated via the industry-standard 12b-1 sales & marketing expense fees for mutual funds. From NAPFA's perspective, there are two problems with these fees: undermined objectivity and inadequate disclosure.

- Objectivity: A mutual fund pays 12b-1 fees directly to the selling broker-dealer, to be shared with the selling broker. This violates NAPFA's rules—though it is neither illegal nor unusual—and it potentially could influence an advisor's recommendation about selection of a fund.
- Disclosure: NAPFA has written to the Securities and Exchange Commission (SEC) to explain that the fees are removed from the clients' assets without notice or invoice to the client, are not reported on their investment statements, and are generally invisible to the client except through reduced investment returns. In 2010, the SEC adopted rules to improve disclosure of 12b-1 fees.

== Conditions ==
Financial advisor must meet the following conditions to become a member:

- Adherence to a fee-only standard is strict: NAPFA members cannot accept compensation in any form from any source other than their clients. There are no exceptions. NAPFA believes that this minimizes potential conflict of interest between a financial planner and their clients.
- The fiduciary relationship requires that members always put their clients' interests before their own and that they disclose any potential conflict of interest prior to the client making a decision. This fiduciary standard is in direct opposition to the fiduciary standard by which stockbrokers are held, a standard under which their legal responsibility is to their employer ahead of their client.
- NAPFA is the only financial planning organization to require a peer review of a candidate member's work output prior to granting membership.
- Peer review ensures that a NAPFA member has the ability to provide comprehensive financial planning across a wide range of potential client needs—investments, taxes, estate planning, college savings, insurance, long-term care insurance, retirement spending, and more.
- All new members since 2012 must have the Certified Financial Planner designation.
- NAPFA has the highest continuing education requirement in the industry, with 60 credit hours required every two years.

=== Comprehensive ===
NAPFA's membership requirements include proof that a financial advisor can produce a comprehensive financial plan for a client. Proof is demonstrated through peer review of a financial plan submitted by the prospective NAPFA member. The plan can either be from an actual client with whom the advisor is working, or it can be a plan produced from a sample set of facts and situations developed by NAPFA to test a candidate's knowledge.

The plan must contain numerous specific elements that are common needs of many individuals and families. These include the following: a client's goals and objectives, net worth statement, cash flow analysis, recent tax return and analysis, insurance needs (medical, home, life, disability, long-term care, auto, umbrella, other), investment analysis and recommendations, retirement needs and projections, and estate plan and related elements (will, Advance health care directive, durable power of attorney, etc.).

== Consumer Education ==
In addition to developing standards for financial advisors and enforcing those standards, NAPFA engages in a variety of free consumer education programs. These are designed to teach consumers how to manage their financial affairs, as well as to identify when they might need the assistance and support of a fee-only financial advisor.

== Consumer Advocacy ==
NAPFA has always advocated on behalf of consumers' interests. In fact, protecting consumers was the impetus behind the creation of the organization—the radical idea in the early 1980s that fee-only financial planning, without high and hidden commissions, would be better for consumers.

Over the years, NAPFA's influence has resulted in greater awareness and adoption of fee-only principles by leading financial advisors, other major financial industry trade associations, and government regulations. Since 2008, NAPFA has joined with two other organizations in the Financial Planning Coalition (FPC) to push for greater change for consumers, at a time when an economic downturn and investment scandals have affected the financial security of nearly all Americans. NAPFA, the Financial Planning Association, and the CFP Board of Standards formed the Financial Planning Coalition to work with Congress and federal agencies to strengthen the rules on financial advisors' fiduciary conduct, fee disclosures, and conflicts of interest.

Among the FPC's successes in this area have been greater disclosure of 12b-1 marketing fees by mutual funds and the SEC study in fall 2010 of a need for a consumer-first fiduciary requirement on investment brokers.

== Cases of fraud ==
Two former presidents of the NAPFA, Mark Spangler (serving in 1998) and James Putman (serving in 1996 and 1997) were charged by the SEC with fraudulent behavior: Putman in 2009, for accepting kickbacks related to unregistered investment pools, and Spangler in 2011, for secretly investing client money in companies that he or his firm owned. The NAPFA responded to Spangler's case by condemning the actions of which he has been accused and suspending his inactive membership.

On April 24, 2012, a Wisconsin federal court awarded summary judgment to the Commission on its claims against James Putman (“Putman”), and ordered Putman to pay disgorgement and prejudgment interest in the amount of $1,530,129 and a civil monetary penalty of $130,000, for a total amount of $1,660,129 . The Securities and Exchange Commission alleged in its complaint that Putman, the founder and Chief Executive Officer of Wealth Management LLC (“WM”), a registered investment adviser located in Appleton, Wisconsin, improperly accepted $1.24 million in 2006 and 2007 in undisclosed payments derived from life insurance premium financing investments made by WM’s clients. The complaint further alleged that Putman breached his fiduciary duty and engaged in fraud by misrepresenting the safety and stability of WM’s clients’ investments.

After a 14-day trial, Spangler, 58, a Seattle investment adviser, was found guilty by a federal jury on 11/7/13 on 24 counts of wire fraud, seven counts of money laundering and one count of investment-adviser fraud. After facing a possible life sentence, He was sentenced 3/14/14 to 16 years in prison for fraud and money laundering after secretly investing more than $46 million of clients’ money into two risky technology startups in which he or his company had an ownership interest. U.S. District Judge Ricardo S. Martinez said the lengthy sentence was based in part on Spangler’s lack of remorse for deceiving his friends and clients.
