= Basic Military Qualification =

Canadian Forces basic training

Basic Military Qualification (BMQ) refers to both the basic training course, and the graduation qualification, received by non-commissioned recruits or reservists seeking entry to the Canadian Forces. The course is 9 weeks in length and conducted at Canadian Forces Leadership and Recruit School in Saint-Jean-sur-Richelieu, Quebec for Regular Force recruits. For reservists the course is condensed to two months during the summer, or over the weekends (typically 9 to 12 weekends) during fall and winter and conducted at any military installation with the necessary resources.

In the training regime of the Canadian Forces, BMQ falls within Developmental Period 1 (DP1), which focuses on the skills and knowledge required for entry level employment and further training. In addition to BMQ, DP1 includes environmental and occupational qualifications, and second language training as required. After completing DP1, Non-Commissioned Members (NCMs) are deemed occupationally employable at an introductory level. Progression to DP2 occurs when the recruit joins a unit and leaves the Basic Training List.

== The course ==
Basic training provides the knowledge that is common to all trades and fields of the Canadian Forces, and "develops a military state of mind and behaviour, the mental and physical endurance and the combat skills necessary for the profession of arms." The training is considered physically, mentally and morally demanding and founded on the fundamental values of the Canadian Armed Forces: Duty, Loyalty, Integrity and Courage. BMQ is common to all non-commissioned recruits of the Canadian Army, Royal Canadian Air Force and the Royal Canadian Navy - regardless of trade.

The course teaches the core skills and knowledge necessary to succeed in a military environment. It puts recruits through significant physical and mental strain, with the goal of instilling a sense of teamwork and cohesion, good working habits, physical and mental tenacity, confidence, military skills, and discipline. Apart from the physical demands, the adjustment to military discipline and lifestyle is often the most difficult aspect of recruit training and may be the most demanding experience for many recruits. There is a high emphasis placed on workplace safety, with instruction in the Workplace Hazardous Materials Information System, fire safety, first aid, and principles that guide the use of workplace equipment and arms. The course also provides training in elements of fieldcraft, such as survival skills, map reading, target location and camouflage.

Training is usually conducted with a platoon of 60 candidates under a warrant Officer or petty officer first class for regular force BMQs. In the Primary Reserve, a BMQ platoon is usually under a commissioned officer in the grade of captain / navy lieutenant or below with a warrant officer / petty officer 1st class as the platoon second in command (2IC). Courses are delivered by four section commanders (ICs), a sergeant / petty officer second class (PO2) or a master corporal / master sailor). Every platoon also always has a Swing NCO (a Sergeant / PO2) and an admin NCO (a master corporal / master sailor) to help the section commanders out with the course. The Swing NCO acts as a back-up course staff in case one of the section commanders is not available although still teaches classes even when they all are. The admin NCO helps the rest of the platoon staff out with administrative duties for the platoon.

Physical training (PT) classes are taught by Personnel Support Programs (PSP) civilian staff. They are responsible for the teaching of all physical instruction to recruits as well as grading recruits on their FORCE test. Due to an agreement between the Canadian Armed Forces and PSP, the course staff still need to be present in PT classes to watch over the recruits to ensure they are obeying the PSP staff.

After BMQ is complete, training within DP1 continues in each candidate's environment (Navy, Air Force, Army) or occupation.

In the Primary Reserve, newly enrolled Officer Cadets/Naval Cadets and Second Lieutenants/Acting Sub-Lieutenants will also undergo BMQ, alongside NCMs, as Module 1 of their Basic Military Officer Qualification (BMOQ) Course.

=== Daily schedule ===
The typical day in BMQ is as follows:

- 0500 hrs: wake up;
- 0530 hrs: morning physical training;
- 0630 hrs: breakfast;
- 0700 hrs: inspection of quarters and beginning of instruction;
- 1130 hrs: lunch;
- 1230 hrs: instruction;
- 1700 hrs: dinner;
- 1800 hrs: common station jobs, personal hygiene, study period; and
- 2200 hrs: lights out.

Reservists BMQ on weekends usually starts Friday evening for a half-day of instruction, then follows a similar full-day schedule for Saturday and Sunday

For reservists:

- 0500 hrs: waking up
- 0530-0600 hrs: physical training
- 0620-0700 hrs: breakfast
- 0730-0800 hrs: inspections
- 0800-1230 hrs: classes
- 1230-1300 hrs: lunch
- 1300-1700 hrs: classes
- 1730-1800 hrs: dinner
- 1830-1900 hrs: physical training
- 1900-2200 hrs: dismissed
- 2200 hrs: lights out
- 2200-0500 hrs: fire picket (walking over the base and making sure everything is safe.) Always done with a fireteam partner. 1hrs shift (2 person per shift)
