= Canadian Forces Leadership and Recruit School =

Coordinates: 45°17′59.96″N 73°17′15.6″W

- École de leadership et de recrues des Forces canadiennes
- School badge
- Active: 1968–present
- Country: Canada
- Branch: Canadian Armed Forces
- Type: School
- Role: BMQ / BMOQ / PLQ / CAFJOD / General Military Training—Instructor
- Size: 2400 or more
- Part of: Canadian Defence Academy (CDA)
- Garrison/HQ: Saint-Jean-sur-Richelieu
- Motto: Apprendre à servir (French for 'Learn to serve')
- Website: www.canada.ca/en/department-national-defence/services/benefits-military/education-training/basic-training/recruit-school.html

Commanders
- Commandant: LCol Francis Lavoie
- School Chief Warrant Officer: Chief Warrant Officer Frederic Nolin
- Notable commanders: Lieutenant-Colonel S.J.R. Whelan (Past commandant)

Insignia
- Abbreviation: CFLRS

The Canadian Forces Leadership and Recruit School (CFLRS; French: École de leadership et de recrues des Forces canadiennes) is located at the Saint-Jean Garrison in Saint-Jean-sur-Richelieu, Quebec. It conducts basic training and professional development programs for officers and non-commissioned members, training more than 7000 people a year on-site. The training is also offered at CFB Borden in Ontario.

== Courses offered ==
The two main courses offered at CFLRS are the Basic Military Qualification (BMQ) for Regular Force non-commissioned members, and the Basic Military Officer Qualification (BMOQ) for Regular Force officers. The basic training courses can be physically and psychologically demanding, and recruits undergo tremendous physical and mental stress during the training.

Those undergoing the nine-week BMQ course are housed at a large dormitory and classroom complex nicknamed the "Mega".

== Responsibilities ==
The school is responsible for the distance learning portion of the Canadian Forces Primary Leadership Qualification (PLQ). Unlike the BMOQ and BMQ courses, which are aimed at recruits and officer cadets, the PLQ is for more senior military members.

The school is also responsible for the Canadian Armed Forces Junior Officer Development (CAFJOD) program which exposes junior officers from the Regular and Reserve Forces to a general and standardized body of foundational knowledge through seven distance learning modules.

The school's motto is Apprendre à servir (French for 'Learn to serve').
