= Basic Military Officer Qualification =

Basic Military Officer Qualification refers to both the basic training course, and the graduation qualification, received by individuals seeking entry as officers to the Canadian Forces. The course is conducted at Canadian Forces Leadership and Recruit School in Saint-Jean, Quebec and is 12 weeks long.

In the training regime of the Canadian Forces, the Basic Military Officer Qualification falls within Developmental Period 1, which focuses on the skills and knowledge required for entry level employment and further training. Developmental Period 1 also includes environmental and occupational qualifications, and second language training as required. After its completion, officers are deemed occupationally employable at an introductory level, although progression to Developmental Period 2 occurs only when the candidate joins a unit and leaves the Basic Training List. This course is designed to prepare future officers to effectively lead small teams in simple operations in both garrison and austere field conditions.

== The course ==
Basic training provides the knowledge that is common to all military occupations and fields of the Canadian Forces, and "develops a military state of mind and behaviour, the mental and physical endurance and the combat skills necessary for the profession of arms." The training is considered physically, mentally and morally demanding and founded on the fundamental values of the Canadian Forces: duty, loyalty, integrity and courage. The Basic Military Officer Qualification is required for all officer candidates of the Canadian Armed Forces, regardless of military role or occupation.

The course is designed to teach the core skills and necessary knowledge to succeed in a military environment. It puts officer candidates through significant physical and mental strain, with the goal of instilling a sense of teamwork and cohesion, good working habits, physical and mental tenacity, confidence, military skills, and discipline. Apart from the physical demands, the adjustment to military discipline and lifestyle is often the most difficult aspect of recruit training and may be the most demanding experience for many candidates.

Training is usually conducted with 60 candidates in a platoon, under a warrant officer, and reporting to a captain who acts as platoon commander. The platoon commander does not normally have much contact with the candidates except for instruction on leadership and battle procedure. Courses are delivered in four sections, commanded by a sergeant or a master corporal. The course is often staffed by combat arms soldiers, but can be taught by NCOs of any trade or field.

Compared to the Basic Military Qualification course for recruits, the Basic Military Officer Qualification course is more academic with 62% of training and evaluations being classrooms based, 25% conducted in the field and 13% being fitness based. Candidates are put in charge of their peers almost immediately after their leadership assessment in week 2 and are expected to resolve issues on their own without staff intervention. Candidates are also held accountable for their peers and subordinates' failures from day one, as it is as much a training course as a selection course to determine which candidates are fit to lead sailors, soldiers, and airmen in the Canadian Forces.

The structure of Basic Military Officer Qualification varies depending on the length of the course but can generally be broken down into three phases. The first phase lasts from 3 to 5 weeks and indoctrinates the candidate into the Canadian Forces teaching basic drill, handling of the C7 service rifle, a fitness evaluation, basic military first aid and general military knowledge. During the first phase candidates are not be allowed to leave the base and have use of their electronics curtailed.

The second phase teaches candidates about more advanced field craft and has the candidate fire the C7, conduct a 13 km forced march, trench digging, rappelling, leadership, battle procedure, force protection operations, topography and conduct tactical exercises without troops. This phase lasts five weeks and is to prepare the candidate for the final phase which evaluates them on their ability to conduct simple missions with 14 subordinates in the field. The final phase lasts 2 to 3 weeks and is conducted in Farnham, Quebec. Candidates conduct operations in a simulated theatre of war while each taking turn leading a four-hour mission against an opposing force. Candidates conduct their missions 24 hours a day until all candidates have been given a chance to lead, after which they receive a small period of rest. Retests if required and authorized generally commence after the forced rest. Throughout the training program fitness is evaluated and improved through group physical training conducted daily at 5 am and specialized fitness programs delivered by qualified trainers throughout the day.
