= PULHHEEMS =

British military medical scale

The PULHHEEMS is a system of grading physical and mental fitness used by Britain's armed forces. PULHHEEMS is tri-service, which is to say that it is used by the British Army, the Royal Navy and the Royal Air Force. Its purpose is to determine the suitability of its employees for posting into military zones. It is not a fitness test as such; rather, it is a test of suitability for purpose.

The PULHHEEMS system, or variations of it, is also used by several members of the British Commonwealth, including Singapore, Canada, Australia, Sri Lanka and New Zealand. The USA uses a system called PULHES. In civilian life, there is a similar system called PULSES which is used to grade levels of disability; it differs from the PULHHEEMS in that it also examines the digestive system, something which the PULHHEEMS does not.

== Usage ==
For new recruits it is part of the first step into the armed forces, whilst for established service people it is a requirement of ongoing employment. Although a PULHHEEMS is carried out on new recruits, it is not itself an entrance examination, the attributes of which depend on the unit conducting the examination.

The examination is carried out on recruits, and five-yearly after a serviceman or woman reaches the age of 30. After the age of 50, people in service are examined every two years. All Generals of any persuasion must be examined yearly. Furthermore, service personnel under the age of 30 are required to undergo a PULHHEEMS in order to attend certain courses, whether occupational or promotional, and also if medically downgraded. A PULHHEEMS is also carried out prior to leaving the armed forces, in part because many former servicemen remain as reserves.

The PULHHEEMS examination can result in medical downgrading if fitness standards do not reach required levels, whether as a consequence of injury, neglect, pregnancy, or old age. Downgrading can reduce a serviceman's pay, and prevent course attendance, which in turn can prevent promotion. Ultimately a serious, permanent medical downgrade can result in discharge from the armed forces on medical grounds.

== Acronym ==
PULHHEEMS is an abbreviation for the factors it is intended to test. These include:

- Physique
- Upper limbs
- Lower limbs (or 'Locomotion', as this includes the back)
- Hearing (right)
- Hearing (left)
- Eyesight right (corrected / uncorrected)
- Eyesight left (corrected / uncorrected)
- Mental function
- Stability (emotional)

== Scoring ==
The attributes examined in PULHHEEMS receive a score from 1 to 8, with 1 being excellent and 8 being unfit for service. Although in theory all attributes can be scored from 1 to 8, in practice only eyesight and hearing can be graded 1. Although there is provision for grading a serviceman's physical measurements as P1, the examination required would be impossible within the constraints of the PULHHEEMS system.

The Mental and Stability measurements are not exhaustive psychological examinations. The former is a test of the ability to form coherent thought processes, whilst the latter is a measurement of the serviceman's stress level.

=== PES/MES ===
Once a person in service has undergone a PULHHEEMS, they receive a score. In the Royal Air Force (RAF), the score is the MES, which stands for "Medical Employment Status." In the other branches, the score is the PES, which stands for "PULHHEEMS Employment Status". This PES is used to determine whether the soldier is "employable in full combatant duties (in any area) in any part of the world" or if they must remain away from the combat area, or within a specific geographic limitation. Sometimes it may be used in determining whether they are unfit for all duties. A PES grade of P2 is excellent, that of P7 is very poor, and P8 is unfit for duty. MES encapsulates the suitability of personnel for posting in the air, on the ground, and in different climates. Thus, a fully fit RAF serviceman will be graded A1 L1 M1 E1 (Only those that need to fly as part of their core duties would be awarded an A1 category. The highest anyone travelling as a passenger will get is A4 rather than P2. Conversely the Royal Navy, which includes the Royal Marines, makes no distinction between postings at sea or on land.

== History ==
The PULHHEEMS system dates from WWII, although before 1983 it was simply PULHEEMS with one H. It replaced an earlier, simpler system which dated from before WWI in which soldiers were graded from A1 to D3 in four bands of three ratings.
