= Military Colleges =

Military Colleges may refer to:

- IDF Military Colleges, Israel
- Canadian Military Colleges
- King George Royal Indian Military Colleges
