= Gervais Carpentier =

Canadian Army general

Brigadier General F.G. Carpentier CD
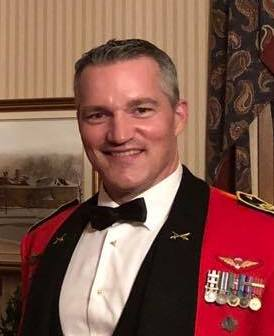
- Education: Royal Military College Saint-Jean, Royal Military College of Canada, Canadian Forces College
- Military career
- Allegiance: Canada
- Branch: Canadian Army
- Service years: 1987- Present
- Rank: Brigadier general
- Units: Royal 22e Régiment, Joint Task Force 2
- Commands: 2nd Battalion Royal 22e Régiment, Royal Military College Saint-Jean, 2nd Canadian Division
- Conflicts: Bosnian War, War in Afghanistan

Brigadier General F.G. Carpentier, CD is currently the Canadian National Military Representative to Supreme Headquarters Allied Powers Europe. He was previously the commanding officer of the 2nd Canadian Division, a position he has held from 2019 to 2021.

== Education ==
Carpentier graduated in 1992 with a bachelor's degree in business administration from the Royal Military College Saint-Jean. He later obtained a master's degree from the Royal Military College of Canada. In 2009, he graduated from the Canadian Forces College Joint Command and Staff Program and in 2017 from the National Security Program.

== Military career ==
Carpentier enrolled into the Canadian Armed Forces in 1987 as an officer cadet at the Royal Military College Saint-Jean. After graduating, he assumed his trade as an infantry officer in the 5th Canadian Mechanized Brigade. In 1993, Carpentier deployed to Bosnia and Herzegovina as a platoon commander, and again in 1995 to Croatia during the Bosnian War. In 1997, Carpentier again deployed as a platoon commander to Haiti with 3rd Battalion R22R. After Haiti, he was an instructor at the Infantry School in Gagetown from 1997 to 1999. Carpentier went on to serve in the Canadian Special Operations Forces Command as a troop commander and eventually command an assault squadron within Joint Task Force 2. During his time with Joint Task Force 2 Carpentier deployed to Afghanistan in 2002 and 2007. From 2009 to 2011, he served in the CANSOFCOM HQ. In 2011, he served as the military assistant to the deputy commander at NATO's Joint Forces Command Naples in Italy.

Carpentier served as the chief of staff for the 5th Canadian Mechanized Brigade Group in 2013. In 2014 Carpantier became the commanding officer of 2nd Battalion Royal 22e Régiment and held this position until 2016. In 2017, Carpentier became the commandant of the Royal Military College Saint-Jean, where he oversaw the re-introduction of a university courses to obtain a degree at the Collage. In 2019, Carpentier was promoted to the rank of brigadier general after becoming the commanding officer of the 2nd Canadian Division on August 15, 2019, taking over from Major General Jennie Carignan after she took command of the NATO mission in Iraq.
