= Richelieu Squadron =

Squadron of the Royal Military College Saint-Jean

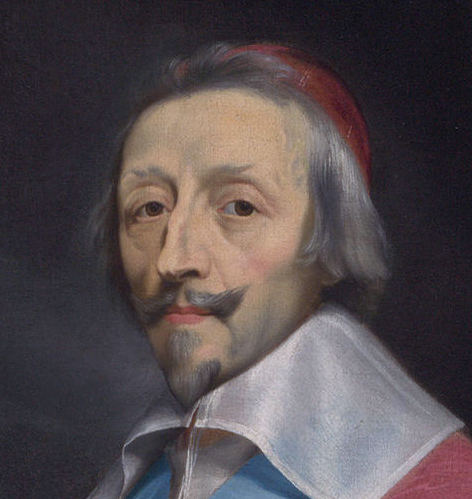
Cardinal Richelieu, the namesake of Richelieu Squadron

Richelieu Squadron is a Squadron of the Royal Military College Saint-Jean that is named jointly in honour of both Cardinal Richelieu and Richelieu, Quebec.

== History ==
Richelieu Squadron was formed after the closure of the Royal Military College Saint-Jean in 1995, on the site of Fort Saint-Jean to provide training and education to Naval and Officer Cadets that needed to complete a preparatory year before attending the Royal Military College of Canada. During this time Naval and Officer Cadets of Richelieu Squadron would undergo military training alongside academics in order to meet the academic requirements of RMC. Richelieu Squadron during these years would typically be made up of around 130 officer cadets each year who would graduate and transfer to Royal Military College of Canada to continue their military education.

In 2007, it was announced that the Royal Military College Saint-Jean (RMCSJ) would re-open and instead of disbanding Richelieu Squadron it would become one of 3 squadrons alongside Tracy and Iberville squadrons. RMCSJ would be inaugurated by Governor General Michaëlle Jean in 2008, changing the role of Richelieu Squadron. With the reopening of RMCSJ it was restricted to only the preparatory year and first year of university education, meaning that people would only be a part of Richelieu Squadron for a maximum of two years.

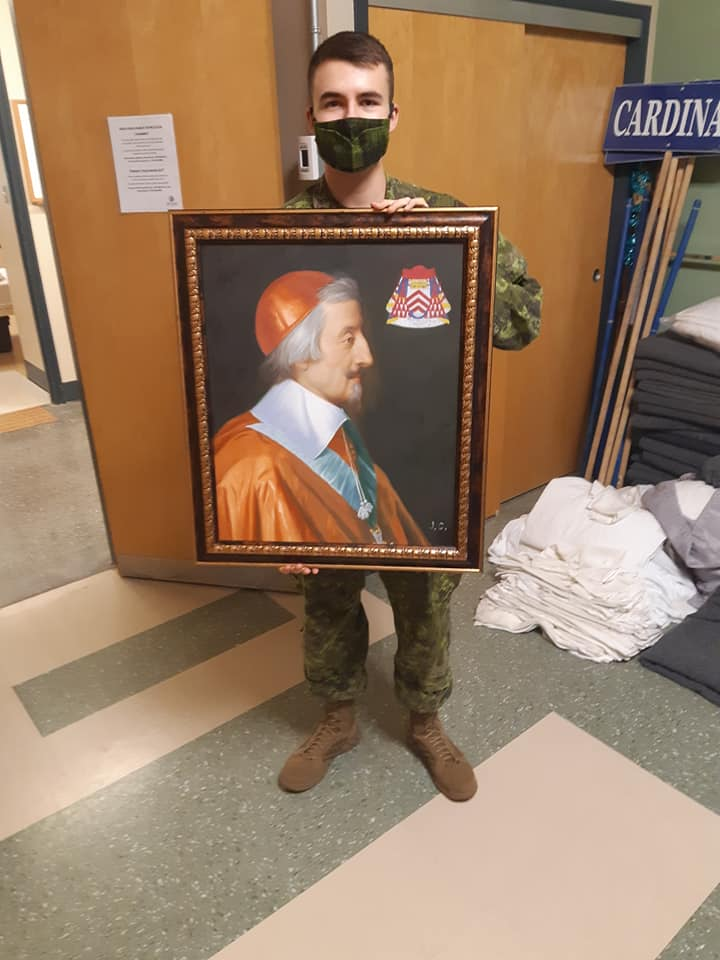
Richelieu Sqn's Portrait of Cardinal Richelieu held by OCdt Faille

== Structure ==
Today the squadron is broken into two flights, named Cardinal and Mousquetaire. Cardinal Flight is named in honour of Richelieu's position as a Cardinal. and Mousquetaire Flight is named as a reference to the prominent role of Cardinal Richelieu in the story of The Three Musketeers by Alexandre Dumas. Each flight is commanded by a Cadet Flight Leader (CFL) and is composed of around 30 members.

In addition to the two flights, there is also an HQ element that is composed of various positions in charge of different aspects of the Richelieu Squadron.
