= Jean Berthiaume =

Canadian Army officer

Colonel (ret) Jean André Berthiaume
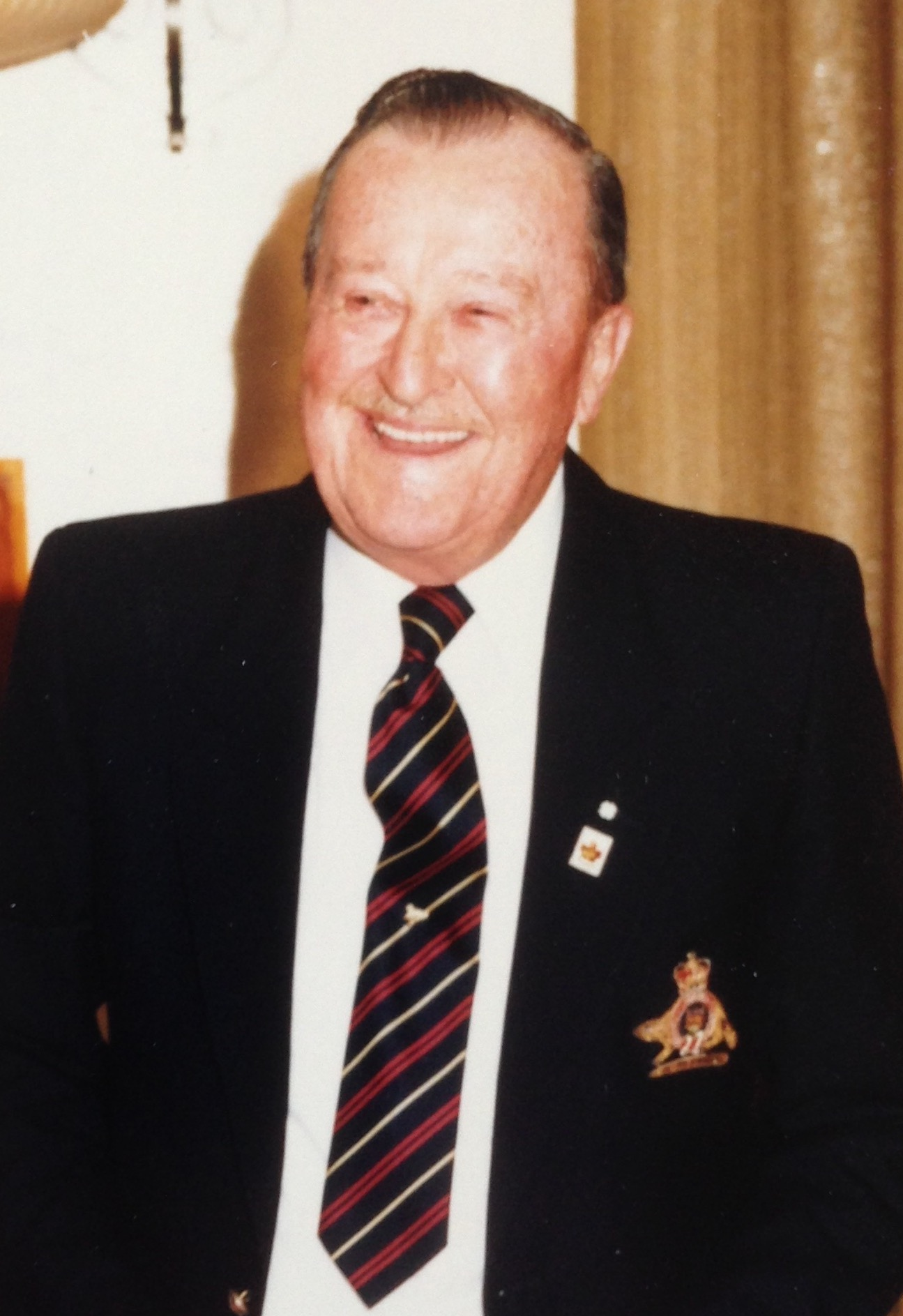
- Colonel (ret) J.A. Berthiaume - 1986
- Nicknames: "Johnnie" "Papa Berthiaume" (Congo)
- Born: November 27, 1915; St-Hyacinthe, Quebec, Canada
- Died: January 26, 2003 (aged 87) St-Hyacinthe, Quebec, Canada
- Allegiance: Canada
- Branch: Canadian Forces
- Service years: 1936–1969; 1990–1993
- Rank: Colonel
- Commands: 1er Royal 22^{e} Régiment; Quebec Western District; Farnham Army cadet camp
- Conflicts: World War II; ONUC
- Awards: Officer of the Order of the British Empire; Knight of the Venerable Order of St. John; Canadian Forces' Decoration

Joseph André Horace Jean Berthiaume, OBE, CD (November 27, 1915 – January 26, 2003) was a Canadian Army officer who served with the Régiment de St-Hyacinthe, the Royal Canadian Infantry Corps and the Royal 22^{e} Régiment.

== Early education ==
Jean André Berthiaume was born on November 27, 1915, in St-Hyacinthe, Quebec. He studied at the Séminaire de St-Hyacinthe, where he earned a degree in letters and arts. He then pursued another degree at the Université de Montréal, where he got a degree in chemistry.

== Before the War ==
At the same time his father was serving at the Regiment, Jean Berthiaume enlisted with the 84th Régiment de St-Hyacinthe in 1936. There completed his basic training as a private and rose to the rank of sergeant. Later he received his officer commission and was promoted to lieutenant.

He married Mme Denise Lapierre on April 14, 1940, at the St-Hyacinthe Cathedral.

== World War II ==
As the war broke out, then Lieutenant Berthiaume continued training his troops in St-Hyacinthe. He was transferred to the 4th Canadian Armoured Brigade at camp Debert in Nova Scotia for preparatory training as GSO with the 7th Canadian Infantry Brigade. He then went to the Canadian Army Command and Staff College in Kingston and after shipped to England. Most of the Canadians in reinforcement stayed in England for almost two years (1942–1944) until D-Day. When arriving in France, as GSO 3 Operations, then captain Berthiaume aided in the orientation of some operations towards the ultimate victory. By the end of the conflict, he was transferred to the 1st Canadian Infantry Division.

== After the war ==
On April 26, 1946, then captain Berthiaume was posted to NDHQ as GSO 2 and the next day was promoted to the rank of Temporary major (T/maj). On November 22, 1947, he was promoted to the rank of major.

After three years in Ottawa, then major Berthiaume went to the Canadian Army Training School in St-Jean, Quebec, in 1949. He managed the Canadian Army Training School in St-Jean before it was transferred to Valcartier in 1952.

He stayed and contributed to the building of the Collège militaire royal de Saint-Jean as Director of Administration.

An uncommon event occurred a few days after Christmas in 1952. A child of one of the CMR's staff fell into the icy waters of the Richelieu river. Upon hearing the child's cry for help, the CMR commandant, colonel Lahaie went onto the ice to rescue the boy, assisted by Captain Gosselin and Major Berthiaume. Others came along as the alarm was sounded. They were all pulled to safety; the child was saved.

Major Berthiaume left St-Jean for Valcartier in 1953 and went to the 2nd Battalion Royal 22^{e} Régiment as deputy commander. He packed the battalion and headed for Germany as Canada's NATO infantry contribution. After setting up over with the 4th Canadian Infantry Brigade, he still was very involved within the military community like in the celebrations of the 10th anniversary of Normandy where he commanded the Canadian group during the weekend long celebrations. In July 1954, he was promoted to the rank of lieutenant-colonel and was chosen as the Canadian representative at the SHAPE in Paris for a year.

Back in Canada, Lcol Berthiaume in 1957, took command of the 1st battalion Royal 22^{e} Régiment until 1960. He was a true gentleman in sharing the warm French-Canadian culture as host of many social functions at the Citadelle.

Leaving Quebec in early summer of 1960, LCol Berthiaume was flown to work with the UNTSO in Palestine. Soon after, in July 1960, he headed to Congo as a United Nations chief of staff of the ONUC contingent.

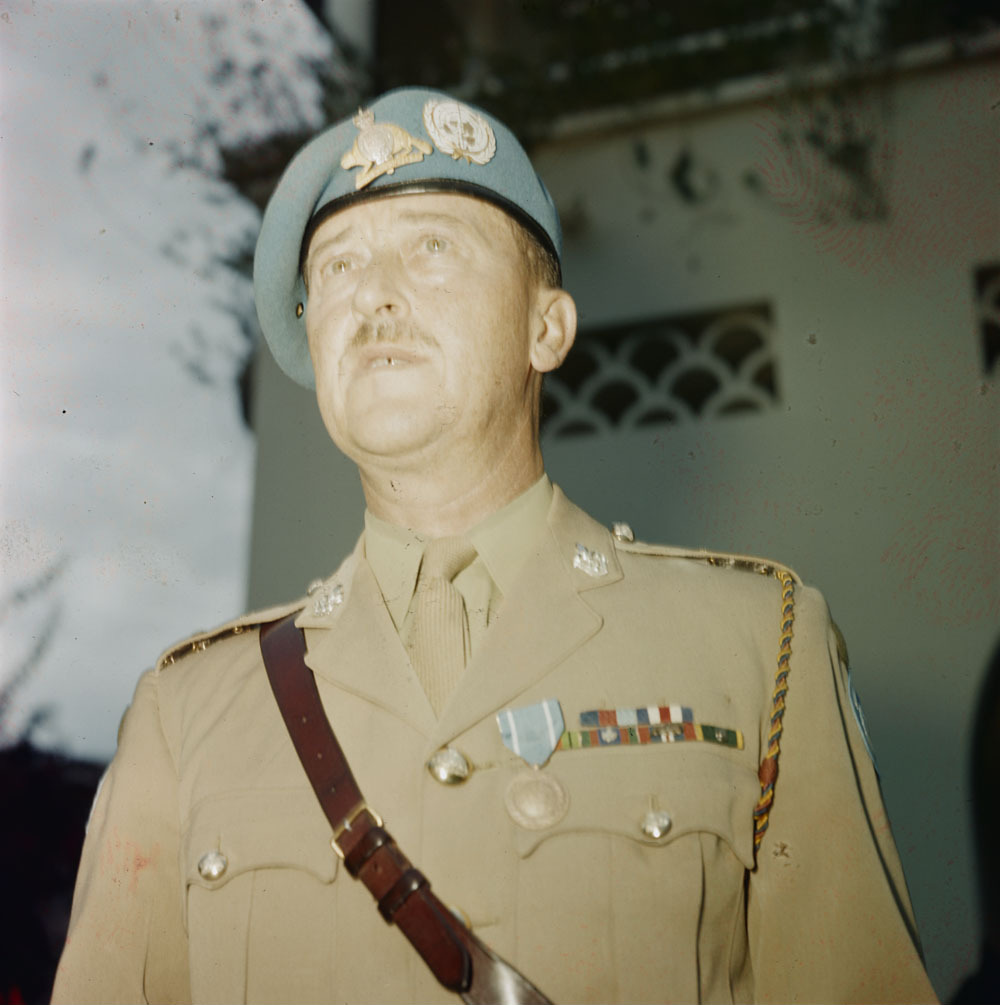
LCol J.A.Berthiaume in Congo 1960

Back in Canada, he went to serve as adjutant general at the Quebec Command HQ. Promoted to the rank of colonel, he commanded the Quebec Western District until his retirement in 1969. During those years, he commanded the Royal Army Cadet Camp of Farnham that closed in 1967.

In 1990, following the death of his predecessor, Lt. Col. (Ret.) Denis Chartier, Col. (Ret.) J.A. Berthiaume assumed the role of honorary colonel of the 6th Battalion, Royal 22nd Regiment[30] until 1993. His experience and professional network provided the battalion with numerous opportunities, which the battalion members were able to take advantage of. As such, he also organized a community television crew (TVC-4) to produce a report on members of the 6th Battalion, Royal 22nd Regiment, who were deplyed on a mission in Cyprus (UNFICYP) in 1992. The production was posted online in 2014 to mark the 100th anniversary of the Royal 22nd Regiment.

== Personal life ==
Upon leaving the service in 1969, Colonel (Ret.) Berthiaume went to work for the Wabasso company in Trois-Rivières, Quebec as Director of Operations Services until his retirement in 1980. During those years, he became involved with the Canadian Manufacturers Association as president of the St. Maurice chapter.

Colonel (Ret.) Berthiaume was a member of the Royal Canadian Legion, Branch #2 of St-Hyacinthe with which he was devoted in many aspects.

Colonel Berthiaume continued his involvement and contribution to the Collège militaire royal de Saint-Jean throughout the years. He always proved a good golf player at the annual benefit golf tournament and other activities.

In St-Hyacinthe, he was a devoted contributor to the Honoré-Mercier hospital's foundation.

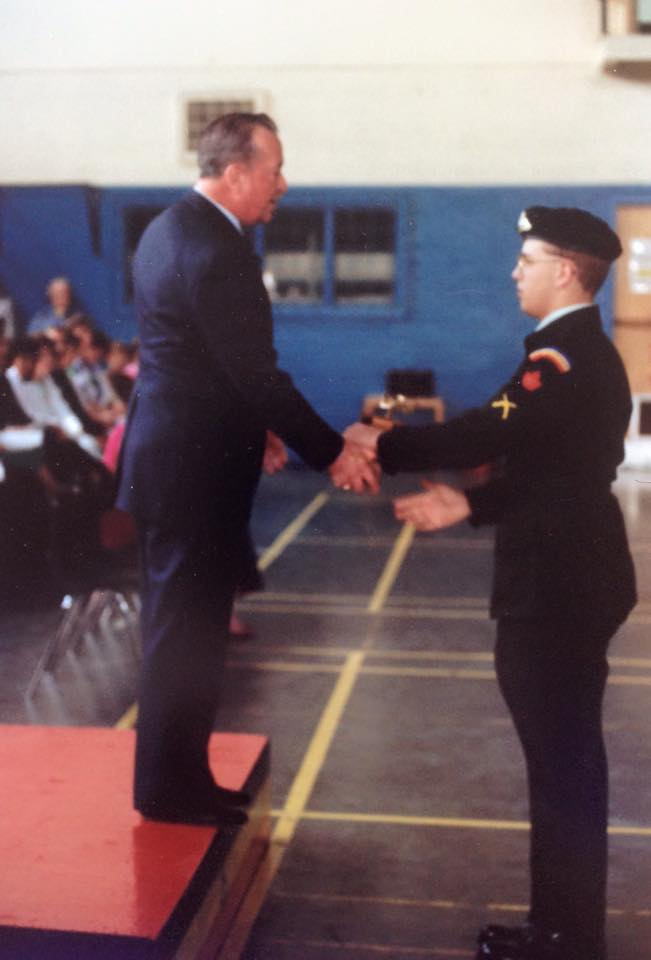
Col (Ret.) Berthiaume congratulating a cadet

== Army cadets ==
During the final years of his active career, Colonel Berthiaume commanded the Royal Army Cadet Camp of Farnham that closed in 1967.

He was particularly close to the Army Corps de Cadets No. 1 from his hometown. In the mid-1990s, he donated several musical instruments to found a band created for children to play in. Organizers agreed to call it "La musique J. A. Berthiaume."

== Honours ==
After World War 2, Jean Berthiaume received the MID for his outstanding services.

For his devotion in the creation of the CMR St-Jean, Colonel Berthiaume was given an honorary college number: H12878.

Colonel J. A. Berthiaume was invested into the Order of the British Empire in 1962 for his impressive organizational skills, initiative, linguistic ability, unmatched negotiating skills and his bravery during the ONUC mission in Congo. He was the first Canadian officer to be given that recognition since the Second World War.

In 1969 he was nominated in the Most Venerable Order of the Hospital of St John of Jerusalem as Officier. In 1977, he was promoted to Knight of the Order.

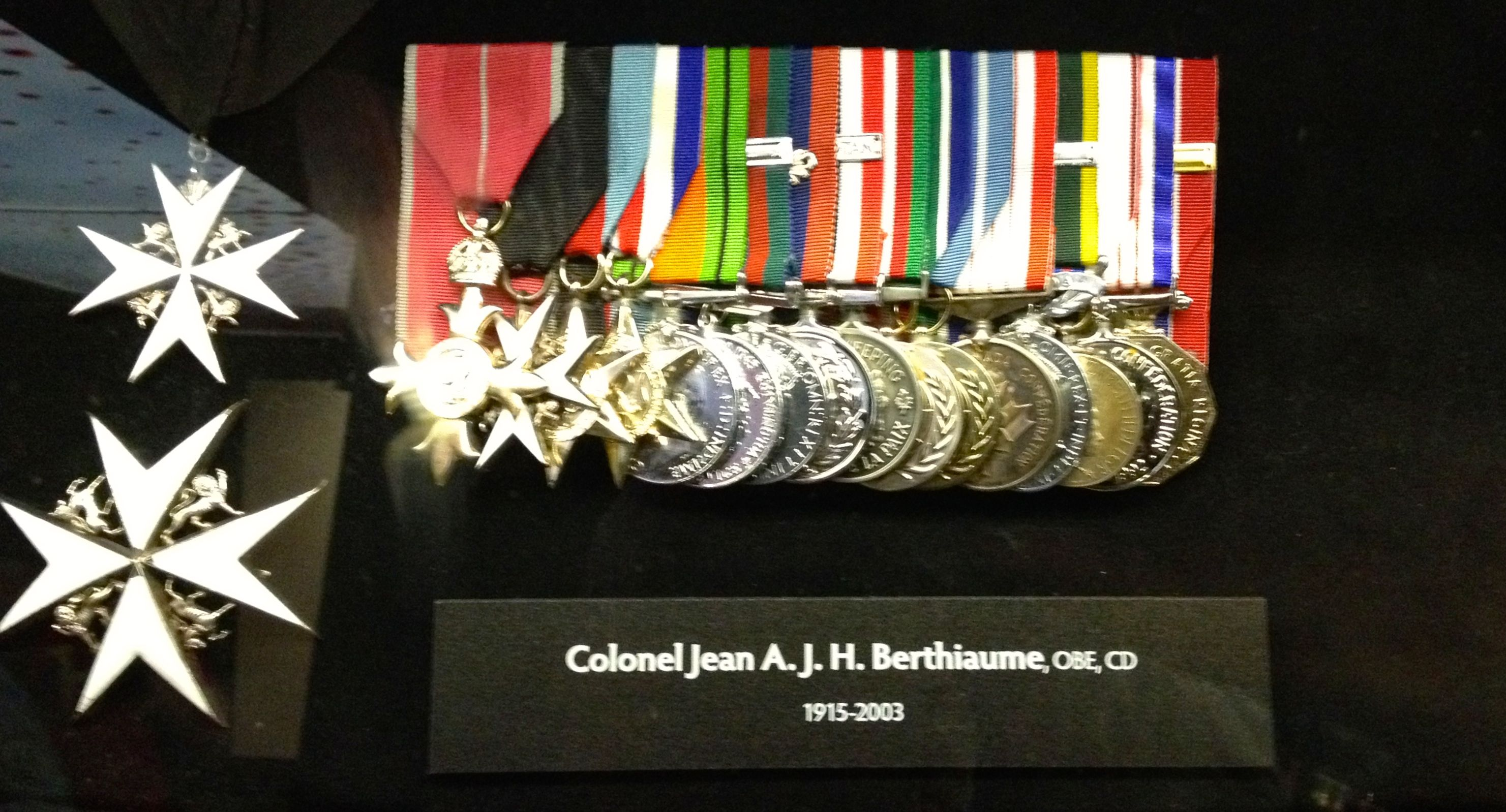
Military medals of J.A. Berthiaume

The city of St-Hyacinthe consecrated one of its streets' name in his memory in 2006.

== Last post ==
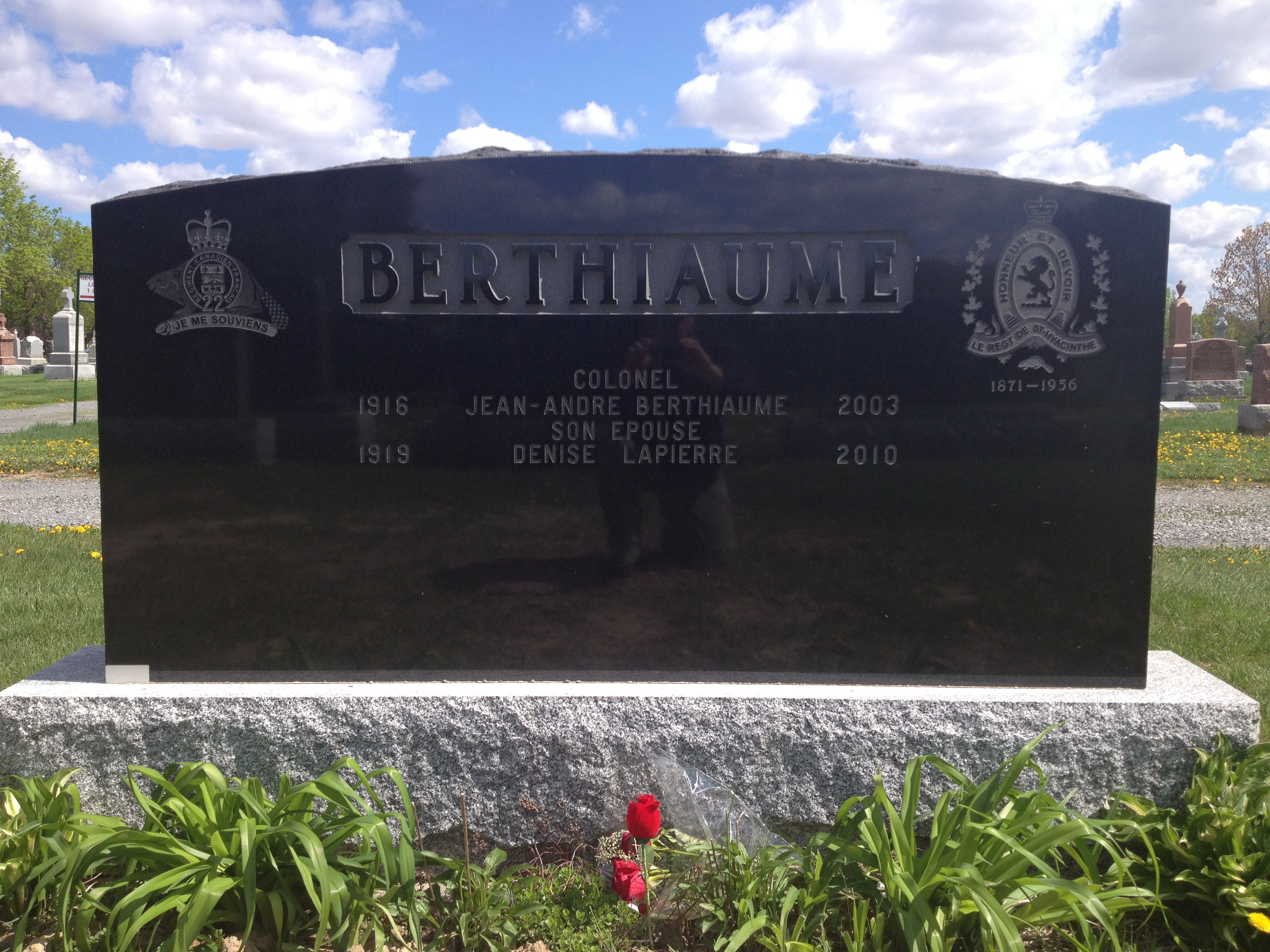
Headstone of Col J. A. Berthiaume and his wife Denise Lapierre in St-Hyacinthe

In 2003 after his last short battle with a secretly kept illness, Colonel (Ret.) Jean André Berthiaume was laid to rest in St-Hyacinthe, with full military honours. His wife Denise died in 2010.

== Books ==
Books in which Colonel Berthiaume has either contributed to or is mentioned in include:

- Canada, the Congo Crisis, and UN Peacekeeping, 1960–64
- Pearson's Peacekeepers: Canada and the United Nations Emergency Force, 1956-67
- Le Canada dans les guerres en Afrique centrale: génocides et pillages des ressources minières du Congo par le Rwanda interposé
- Le Collège militaire Royal de Saint-Jean, Une université à caractère différent
- Canadian Defence Quarterly, Volume 22
- In the eye of the storm: a history of Canadian peacekeeping
- Biographies canadiennes-françaises
- Uncertain mandate; politics of the U.N. Congo operation
- De Rivière-de-la-Paix au maintien de la paix: les batailles d'un Franco Albertain
- Chronique de politique étrangère, Volume 14
- Evolution de la crise congolaise de septembre 1960 à avril 1961
- Revue générale pour l'humaniste des temps nouveaux
- United Nations Peacekeeping, 1946-1967
- Soldiering for Peace
- Canadian House of Commons Debates, Official Report, Volume 7

Military offices
| Preceded by None | Director of Administration of the Collège militaire royal de St-Jean; 1952–1953 | Succeeded by Maj J.L. Lessard, CD |
| Preceded by Lcol (Mgén) B. J. Guimond, CD | Commander of the 1st Battalion Royal 22^{e} Régiment; 1957–1960 | Succeeded by Lcol (Col) P. E. Chassé, MBE, CD |
| Preceded by None | Chief of Staff for the United Nations Operation in the Congo; 1960 | Succeeded by |
| Preceded by | Commander Farnham Army Cadet Camp; 1964–1967 | Succeeded by None |
| Preceded by | Commander Quebec Western District; 1964–1968 | Succeeded by |
| Preceded by Lcol(h) D. Chartier, CD | Honorary Colonel of the 6e Battalion Royal 22^{e} Régiment; 1990–1993 | Succeeded by Lcol(h) J. A. G. Roberge |
