= Nicolas J-L Pilon =

Canadian Army officer

- Military career
- Allegiance: Canada
- Branch: Canadian Army
- Service years: 1992–present
- Rank: Brigadier general
- Commands: RMC Saint-Jean; 2 Combat Engineer Regiment(2 CER); United Nations Military Forces on the MINUSTAH Stabilization Mission.
- Conflicts: War in Afghanistan
- Awards: Meritorious Service Medal; Canadian Forces' Decoration

Brigadier General Nicolas J-L Pilon , MSM, CD is a Canadian Army officer who has served as the Commandant of RMC Saint-Jean since August 9, 2019. Previously he served as the Commanding Officer of the 2nd Combat Engineer Regiment and served in Haiti as Chief of Staff of the United Nations Military Forces on the MINUSTAH Stabilization Mission. Due to his efforts in the MINUSTAH Stabilization Mission he was awarded the Meritorious Service Medal.

== Biography ==
Nicolas J-L Pilon graduated with a bachelor's degree in Civil Engineering from the Royal Military College of Canada (RMC) in Kingston Ontario in 1996. He later obtained a master's degree in Defense Studies from RMC and completed the Strategic Security and Defense Studies course from the Royal College of Defense Studies. He was promoted to the rank of Brigadier General on 13 May 2021 and appointed the Director General Defence Force Planning.
