= Royal Military College Saint-Jean =

Canadian military college

- Coat of arms
- Motto: Verité; Devoir; Vaillance; Truth; Duty; Valour
- Type: Military college
- Established: 1952; 74 years ago
- Affiliations: IAMA/AIAM, BCI, RSEQ, Cégep de Saint-Jean-sur-Richelieu
- Chancellor: David McGuinty (ex officio as Defence Minister)
- Commandant: Col Guillaume Tremblay
- Administrative staff: 100
- Undergraduates: up to 150
- Location: Saint-Jean-sur-Richelieu, Quebec, Canada; 45°17′49″N 73°15′09″W
- Campus: 80 acres (32 ha), waterfront, situated on the west bank of the Richelieu River, Fort Saint-Jean (Quebec)
- Website: cmrsj-rmcsj.forces.gc.ca
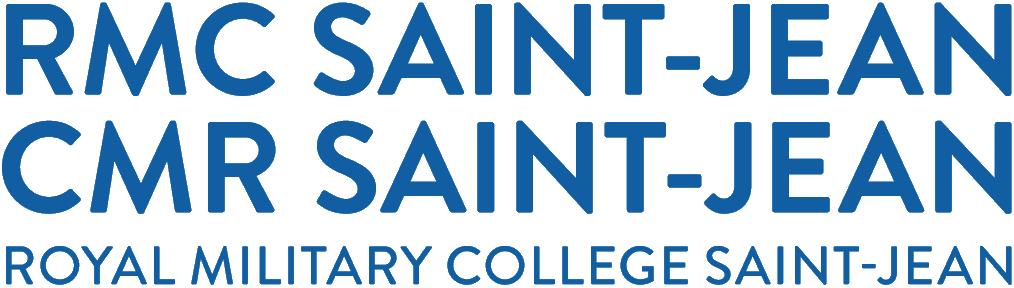

The Royal Military College Saint-Jean (French: Collège militaire royal de Saint-Jean), commonly referred to as RMC Saint-Jean and CMR, is a Canadian military college and university. It is located on the historical site of Fort Saint-Jean in Saint-Jean-sur-Richelieu, Quebec, 40 km south of Montreal. RMC Saint-Jean is an arm of the Canadian Military College (CMC) system that provides two college-level programs in Social Science and Science, which are closely integrated with the undergraduate programs offered by the Royal Military College of Canada. RMC Saint-Jean was granted independent university status in 2021, and it currently offers a bachelor's degree in International Studies.

== Academics ==
Science	Social Sciences
Mathematics; Biology; Physics; Chemistry	Sociology; Psychology; History; Political Science; Politics; Economics

The core courses in both programs include: literature, humanities, second language, and physical education.

The mandate of the preparatory year is to develop in its students good work habits, academic diligence, critical facility, and team spirit.

== Regular Officer Training Program ==
Officer and Naval Cadets at RMC Saint-Jean are eligible for the Regular Officer Training Program. This program is designed for officer candidates to obtain a bachelor degree (which is required to be an officer in the Canadian Armed Forces) while attending either the Royal Military College in Saint-Jean or the Royal Military College of Canada in Kingston, Ontario. For certain degrees, it is possible to do ROTP through a civilian university if it is not offered at one of the military colleges.

== Uniforms ==
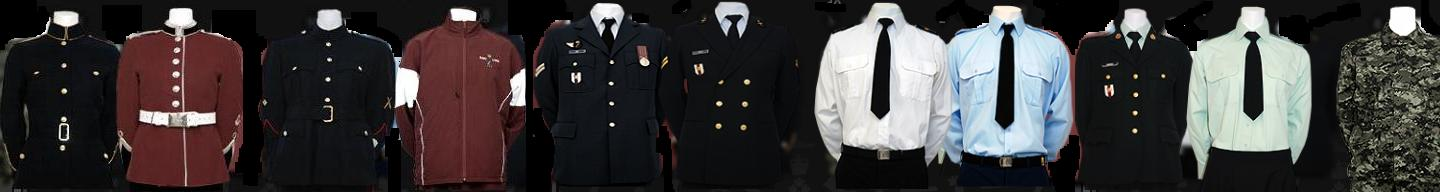
RMC Saint-Jean uniforms

Officer/Naval cadets wear a variety of uniforms depending on the occasion and their environment: ceremonial dress (semi ceremonial); full dress (formal occasions); outside sports dress; service dress Air Force; service dress Navy; service dress Navy without jacket; Service dress Air Force without jacket; service dress Army without jacket; and combat dress.

In winter 2009, Royal Military College Officer/Naval cadets returned to wearing a distinctive Dress of the Day (DOD) uniform which consists of a white shirt, black sweater/light jacket, as well as black trousers/skirt with a red stripe down the side. The headdress is a black wedge with red piping.

Mess dress is worn in the Senior Staff Mess for formal occasions such as mess dinners.

== Positions of responsibility ==
To further their leadership skills and abilities, Officer/Naval cadets are appointed to positions of responsibility according to merit or a need for development. Each cadet wears 1–5 of bars to indicate authority. An appointment typically last a semester.

Position	Description	Bars
CSL/COMO	The Cadet Squadron Leader (CSL) is responsible for the management of a squadron of cadets, which generally consists of around of 75 members.	4
CSTO/INSTRO	The Cadet Squadron Training Officer (CSTO) is responsible for discipline and ensuring good behaviour, dress, and deportment of all cadets in a squadron.	3
CFL/COMI	The Cadet Flight Leader (CFL) is responsible for one of the two flights of cadets within a squadron, which generally consists of around of 30 members.	3
DCFL/ACOMI	The Deputy Cadet Flight Leader (DCFL) is a 2 I/C to the CFL and is responsible for discipline and ensuring good behaviour, dress, and deportment of all cadets in a flight.	2
SECL	The Section Leader (SECL) is responsible for one of 4 section of cadets within a flight, which generally consists of around of 10 members.	2
DCOMSEC/ACOMSEC	The Deputy Section Commander is a 2 I/C to the COMSEC and is responsible for discipline and ensuring good behaviour, dress, and deportment of all cadets in a section.	1

== Squadrons of the Cadet Wing ==
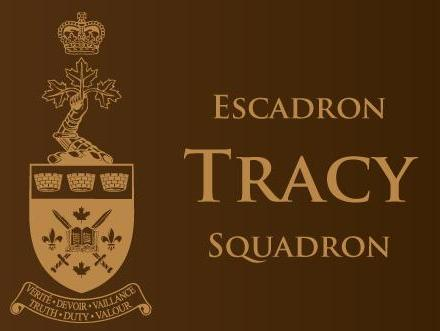
Tracy Squadron, RMC Saint-Jean

The undergraduate body, known as the Cadet Wing, is subdivided into three smaller groupings called Squadrons, under the guidance and supervision of senior cadets. The squadrons are currently named in honour of local communities that take their name from historical figures of New France. Squadrons are subdivided into flights and sections. In 2017, another squadron was added named Jolliet. These squadrons have a competition called the "Commandants Cup" which is a competition in the four pillars of the college.

Squadron #	Name	Historical figure
1	Richelieu	Cardinal Richelieu
2	Iberville	Pierre Le Moyne d'Iberville
3	Tracy	Alexandre de Prouville de Tracy
4	Jolliet	Louis Jolliet
5	Prince	Tommy Prince

In the 1960s, the three squadrons were named Cartier, Maisonneuve and Champlain in honour of historical figures. In 2026, Prince squadron became the official fifth squadron.

== History ==
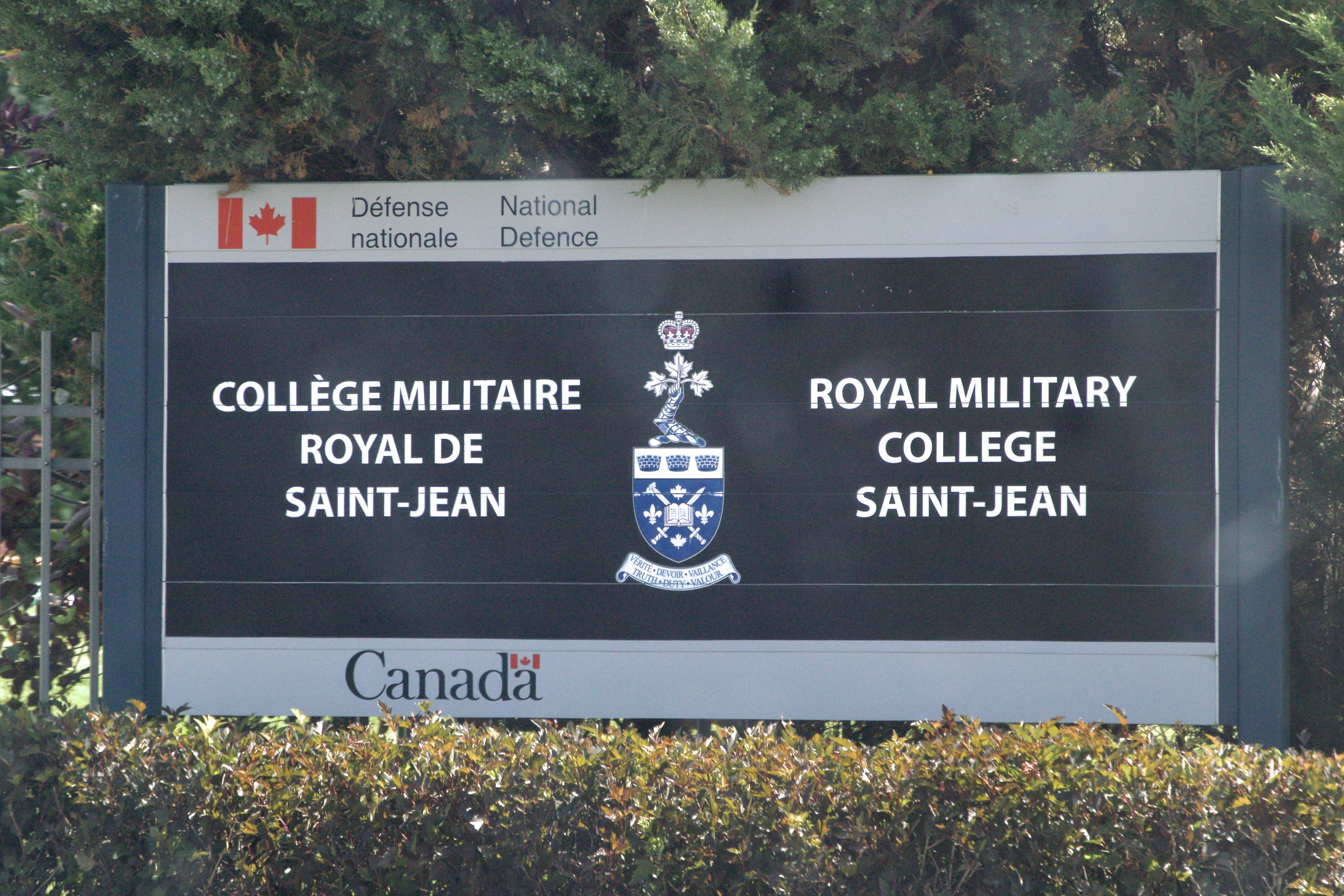
RMC Saint-Jean main entrance

In the fall of 2007, the federal government reopened the military college at Saint-Jean. The military college was slated for closure in 1995, but on 9 July 1994, the federal and provincial governments agreed to maintain it as a non-degree-granting college.

The reopened RMC Saint-Jean greatly differs from the original college which opened in 1952 and from the RMC of Canada located in Kingston. The new RMC Saint-Jean encompasses the Canadian Forces Management and Development School, one of the oldest CF training establishments in the country. It is also the home to the Chief Warrant Officer Robert Osside Profession of Arms Institute, which develops the prospective future senior leaders of the Canadian Forces NCM Corps.

Michaëlle Jean, Governor General of Canada, inaugurated the Royal Military College Saint-Jean on 24 May 2008, and she presented the new college coat of arms to the commandant, Colonel François Pion.

The Commandant of Royal Military College Saint-Jean reports to the Commander, Canadian Defence Academy (CDA). RMC Saint-Jean also has its own board of governors. Officer/Naval cadets at RMC Saint-Jean are issued scarlet uniforms. The first-year program at RMC Saint-Jean is freeing up beds at RMC allowing more Regular Officer Training Program (ROTP) cadets to attend RMC rather than civilian universities.

Year	Significance	
1926	Fort Saint-Jean plaque (Historic Sites and Monuments Board of Canada 1926) Constructed in 1743 by M. de Léry under orders from Governor la Galissonnière. This post was for all the military expeditions towards Lake Champlain. On 31 August 1760, Commandant de Roquemaure had it blown up in accordance with orders from the Governor de Vaudreuil to prevent its falling into the hands of the English. Rebuilt by Governor Carleton, in 1773. During the same year, under the command of Major Charles Preston of the 26th regiment, it withstood a 45-day siege by the American troops commanded by General Montgomery.	
1926	Fort Saint-Jean plaque (Historic Sites and Monuments Board of Canada 1926, replaced 1980): "As a result of the Iroquois wars a first fort was erected at Saint-Jean by the French in 1666. In 1748 a second fort was built to protect the French colony against British military expeditions coming up the Richelieu. Later on, as a result of the American Revolution two redoubts were built to protect the now English colony against an American invasion. Following the 1837 uprising a new military complex was built on the site of its predecessors. It is this complex which has served since 1952 as the core of the new Collège militaire royal de Saint-Jean."	
1948	In the post-war reorganization of the Canadian Forces, the Canadian Military Colleges Circle (CMC) was formed with RMC, Royal Roads Military College (RRMC) and Collège militaire royal de Saint-Jean (CMR), now known as RMC Saint-Jean	
1950	The Old Brigade, alumni celebrating 50 or more years since they entered one of the military colleges, are inducted.	
1952	The Collège militaire royal de Saint-Jean (CMR) was established to conduct tri-service cadet training within the Canadian Forces. It was a classical college, with the initial purpose of providing a more equitable representation of French Canadians in the three services of the Canadian Forces. During the spring of 1952, Louis Saint-Laurent, Prime Minister of Canada, made the decision to found a bilingual military college in Quebec, to open in September. In 1952 the Governor General of Canada officially opened the CMR.	Royal Military College Saint Jean 60th anniversary 1952–2012
1968	Pavillon Lahaie was built, featuring laboratory, library and office space	
1971	CMR established a formal partnership with the Université de Sherbrooke, after which CMR cadets were able to obtain a bachelor's degree without leaving Saint-Jean.	
1972	Publication of "Le Defilé 1952–1972 Collège Militaire Royal de Saint-Jean 20th Anniversary Yearbook"	
1973	The CMR March, "La marche du Richelieu", composed in 1954 by Madame Denise Chabot, the wife of head of French department LCol C.A. Chabot, became the official college march. "La Gaillarde" is the slow march.; To honour the academic staff of Canadian Military Colleges, the bands play "March of the Peers: from Iolanthe" (1881) words Sir William S. Gilbert, music Sir Arthur Seymour Sullivan (1842–1900), arrangement Bryceson Treharne which opens with a fanfare leading to a swaggering march from Sullivan's ‘Iolanthe’.	
1974	Col (Ret'd) André D. Gauthier OMM, CD, then Vice-Commandant and Director of Cadets 1973–1975 presented "CADET" (1974), an 18-inch statuette of an Officer Cadet to CMR, which is currently displayed in the Commandant's Office. The then Cadet Wing Commander, 10055 OCdt Pierre Trahan (CMR 1974) served as the model 'at attention' and in the moment of drawing his sword to bring it to a full salute as on a ceremonial parade ground.	
1 October 1977	The College is granted the Freedom of the City.	
1977–1991	25th Anniversary celebrations on 8 October 1977.; Plaque presented to Collège Militaire Royal de Saint-Jean by the RMC Club 8 October 1977	
1983	First Terry-Fox run in Saint-Jean 1983: 2,000 runners attended the 2nd race held Sun 9 September 1984	
1984	Honour Guard of 114 cadets at the visit of Pope Jean-Paul II on 20 September 1984; On Saturday 12 May 1984, the band performed at the CMR graduation for the first time	
1985	The Quebec government passed an act granting CMR its own university charter.	
1988	CMR was authorized to grant master's and doctorate degrees.	
1992	The College is granted the Freedom of the City.	
1994	Col (Ret'd) André D. Gauthier OMM, CD, then Vice-Commandant and Director of Cadets 1973–1975, loaned over 30 military-themed statuettes and bas reliefs, which were displayed at the Cadet Mess at CMR until the college's closure. These works now form part of the Gauthier Collection of over 70 items on display at RMC.	
1995	The College is granted the Freedom of the City.; Following the end of the Cold War and massive government cutbacks on defence spending, the Department of National Defence closed Royal Roads Military College (RRMC) and Collège militaire royal de Saint-Jean (CMR).; RRMC is no longer a military institution, and is now maintained by the Government of British Columbia as Royal Roads University.; The loss of CMR and RRMC along with their many traditions and history as military colleges remains a bitter event for many cadets and alumni.	
2007	The reopening of CMR was discussed during the Debates of the Senate (Hansard) 1st Session, 39th Parliament, Volume 143, Issue 93 on Thursday, 3 May 2007.; The reopening of CMR was announced in July 2007 for the fall term 2007.	
2008	Michaëlle Jean, Governor General of Canada, inaugurated the bilingually named Royal Military College Saint-Jean (RMC Saint-Jean) and Collège militaire royal de Saint-Jean (CMR Saint-Jean).; On 24 May 2008, she presented the new college coat of arms to the commandant, Colonel François Pion.; RMC Saint-Jean now operates as part of ASU Saint-Jean as Campus Saint-Jean where preparatory year ("prep year") cadets acquire the necessary academic standard needed to attend RMC.	Officer Cadet's Le Saint-Maurice mess tables commemorate old & new Coat of Arms of RMC Saint-Jean
2012	Royal Military College Saint-Jean celebrates 60th anniversary 1952–2012.; On 22 April, the College is granted the Freedom of the City.	Royal Military College Saint Jean 60th anniversary gala, music by 6e Battalion Royal 22e Régiment
2015	Royal Military College Saint-Jean Dutch Canadian Friendship Tulip Garden	
2017	Held Leadersphere Symposium 2017 and hosted International Symposium on the Development of Military Academies (ISoDoMA); Developed the Chief Warrant Officer Robert-Osside Profession of Arms Institute	
2018	RMC Saint-Jean once again offers courses to obtain a university degree in International Studies	
2020	The Academic year of 2019–2020 is cut short at RMC Saint-Jean and RMCC in March 2020, due to the COVID-19 pandemic. Cadets continued their studies through online class.	
2021	On 14 May 2021 the first class since 1995 graduated: 12 Officer Cadets graduated with a Bachelor of Arts degree in International Studies and received their commissions; 4 Senior NCMs completed a University Certificate in International Studies from CMR.	

== Features and buildings ==
RMC Saint-Jean pin

Richelieu, Jolliet, Tracy and Iberville Squadrons live in the Cartier and Champlain Blocks. The Vanier, DeLéry, Dextraze, Lahaie and Massey Pavillons along with the Old Mess are shared. The campus provides technological support: library, laboratories, learning materials, and Internet access. RMC Saint-Jean infrastructure is currently used by the Canadian Forces located at ASU Saint-Jean and by a non-profit corporation called Campus du Fort Saint-Jean (Quebec), which arranges for the upkeep of many of the educational facilities and leases them out to educational institutions such as the Université du Québec à Montréal (UQAM) for their local program while also renting out others for short events such as large banquets or conventions. The Register of the Government of Canada Heritage Buildings lists six recognized Federal Heritage Buildings on the Royal Military College Saint-Jean grounds:

Building	Built	Recognition	Photo
Cartier Pavilion	1955	Honours Jacques Cartier, French navigator and explorer who claimed what is now Canada for France; Residence for officers, officer cadets and civilian students	
Champlain Pavilion	1953	Residence for officers, officer cadets and civilian students	
CWO Couture Building 16	2012	Drill hall named after Chief Warrant Officer Couture, who served for 17 years at RMC Saint-Jean from 1962 to 1979, and who died in 2010.; Display cabinet features his uniform, photo, sword and pace stick.	
DeLery Building	1957	Academic classrooms and administrative offices named after Gaspard-Joseph Chaussegros de Léry, a military engineer who built Fort Saint-Jean (Quebec) in 1748	
Dextraze Pavilion	1992	Dining room named after General J.A. Dextraze, H18111, former Chief of the Defence Staff	
Lahaie Pavilion	1968–74	Library laboratories and additional offices for professors and staff named after brigadier general Marcelin L. Lahaie, the first commandant at CMR.	
Maisonneuve pavilion	1953	Dormitory named after Paul de Chomedey de Maisonneuve, founder of Montreal, Quebec; used as a residence by Officers, Officer Cadets, and civilian students.	
Massey Building Musée Fort-Saint-Jean Pavillon Les Forges	1937	Named after Vincent Massey former Governor General of Canada; The old forge building (1839) burned in 1883; The site was transformed into a mess for officer cadets known as the 'old forge'.; The current building houses the Corporation du Fort Saint-Jean, a non-profit corporation which manages the site; Fort Saint-Jean Museum and is rented for private functions.; The Musée du Fort Saint-Jean is located in Les Forges; the tour includes a historic interpretation of the campus's military facilities, heritage-related and contemporary.	
Officer Cadet Mess, Mess Saint-Maurice building	1956	Officer Cadet mess at the college known as the Mess Saint-Maurice, named after Saint Maurice, a Roman military leader who was killed for not punishing Christians.	
Vieux Mess building	1839	The Vieux Mess building, used for special events and mess dinners.	
Parade square	1955	300 by 400 feet (91 by 122 m)	
Private Married Quarters (PMQ)	bricks (1935), wood (1952)	Residence for military personnel and their families	
Administration Building No. 24 (1937–38)	1938	Recognized Federal Heritage Building (1989), Saint-Jean-sur-Richelieu, Canada, QC	
Vanier Pavilion	1957	Sport Complex, gymnasium, skating rink, pool, also outdoor soccer, tennis, and Canadian football fields; Named after Georges P. Vanier, former Governor General of Canada	
Former Guardhouse and Museum, Building 26	1885	Served as a guardhouse & museum (1972–2006)	
Montcalm Barracks	1839	Named after General Louis-Joseph de Montcalm: Recognized Federal Heritage Building 1987; Originally served as classrooms before being converted to a dormitory for officer cadets.	
Gallisonnière Barracks	1838	Named after New France Governor Roland-Michel Barrin de La Galissonière: Recognized Federal Heritage Building 1987; Originally served as classrooms before being converted to a dormitory for officer cadets.	

=== Museum ===
Fort Saint-Jean Museum
- Established: 1965
- Location: Massey Building, Old Forge, on campus of Royal Military College Saint-Jean, Saint-Jean-sur-Richelieu Quebec
- Curator: Eric Ruel
- Website: museedufortsaintjean.ca

The museum is located in Fort Saint-Jean on the campus of the Collège militaire royal de Saint-Jean. The museum's mandate is to collect, conserve, research and display material relating to the history of the CMR, its former cadets and its site, Saint-Jean-sur-Richelieu. Guided tours are offered. The museum contains collections of military memorabilia, military artefacts, maps, models, videos and historical objects. The site has been occupied since 1666 by different garrisons, a shipyard and a military college. The CMR Ex-Cadet Foundation manages the museum which recognizes more than 325 years (1666–1995) of military history at the fortifications located on the Richelieu River. The flora and centenary trees enhance the site. The RMC Saint-Jean art collection includes a bronze sculpture of a cadet 'Truth Duty Valour (1976)', by William McElcheran (Canadian 1927–1999) "Presented to ‘Le Collège Militaire Royal de Saint-Jean’ by the commandant, staff & cadets of R.M.C., Canada on the occasion of the sister College's visit, 12–17 May 1976".

The museum club began as a club for cadets in 1972 with the head of the museum club serving as curator. Officer Cadets were part of the team that converted the old guard house into a proper museum. Office Cadets designed diorama(s) used in the museum and the business card from the museum featured a picture of one of the officer cadet's model soldiers on it.

The museum was closed from 1998 to 2003. The Museum Committee of the CMR Ex-Cadet Club Foundation was founded on 22 January 2003. When the museum was accredited a Canadian Forces Museum, the Museum Committee became an independent entity separate from the Foundation.

In 2006, while Hélène Ladouceur served as curator, the museum site moved from the old guardhouse to the entrance of the former Protestant Chapel. LGen (ret.) and Senator Roméo A. Dallaire presided over the official opening, which took place on 29 March 2006.

Eric Ruel became the museum curator in 2006. The museum website museedufortsaintjean.ca was created in June 2007.

In May 2012, while Eric Ruel served as curator, the museum relocated to the historical pavilion "les Forges". The museum is open Wednesday to Sunday, from 10:00 to 17:00, from 24 May until 1 September.

Archaeology digs have taken place on the site from 2009 to 2013 through the Quebec Archaeo Month, an initiative of Archéo-Québec. Funded by the Directorate of History and Heritage of the Canadian Forces as part of a five-year agreement between the Fort Saint-Jean Museum, Laval University and the Royal Military College Saint-Jean, the Archaeology Digs are supported by the Corporation du Fort Saint-Jean and archaeologists from Parks Canada. The museum is a member of the Canadian Museums Association, Canadian Heritage Information Network (CHIN), Virtual Museum of Canada and the Organization of Military Museums of Canada Inc. The museum is an accredited museum within the Canadian Forces Museum System. The museum has formed a cooperating association of friends of the museum to assist with projects.

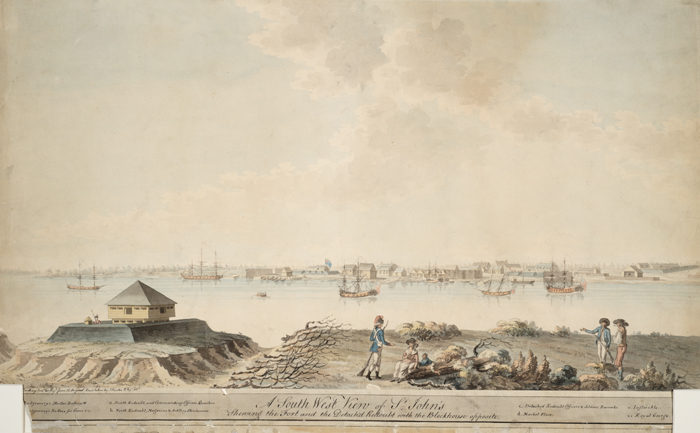
Fort Saint-Jean circa 1775, siege of the fort

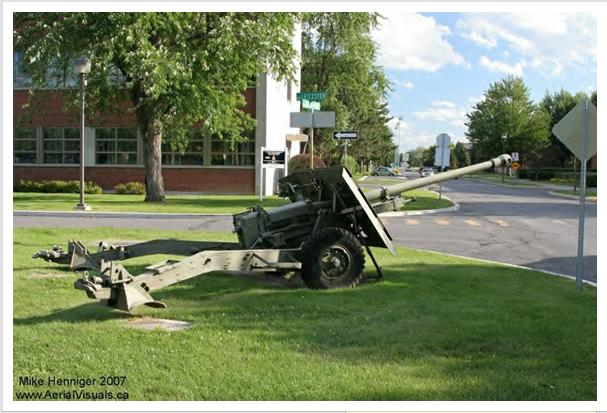
Artillery at Royal Military College Saint-Jean

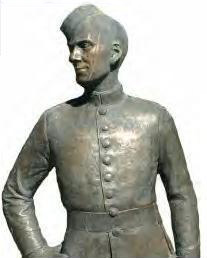
Cadet Sculpture 'Truth, Duty, Valour' by William McElcheran

=== Memorials ===
Other	Description	Photo
25th Anniversary Monument	Donated by the Club des Anciens du CMR de Saint-Jean in 1977 to honour 25th anniversary of college; Unveiled by Prime Minister Pierre Elliott Trudeau	
Second World War Memorial (1 Dec 1945) 24063-009	A granite slab erected on 1 December 1945 is dedicated to the officers, non-commissioned officers and men of No. 48 Canadian Infantry (Basic) Training unit who died during the Second World War.; Includes the Bible's 2 Timothy 4:7 (King James Version): I have fought the good fight, I have finished my course, I have kept the faith.; Donated by the Club des Anciens du CMR de Saint-Jean	
24063-018	A plaque on a granite slab is dedicated to former Sergeant-Majors of the Collège Militaire Royal de Saint-Jean.	
24063-005	The stone shaft was erected on 26 September 1964 to commemorate the 50th anniversary of the founding of the Royal 22^{e} Régiment (French-Canadian).; The Regiment trained at Fort Saint-Jean in 1914.; The monument lists the Regiment's battle honours.	
R22R 100th anniversary Plaque	100th anniversary of the founding of the Royal 22^{e} Régiment in 1914.	
A Century of Service	A plaque commemorates the centennial of the Royal Canadian Regiment 1883–1983, Canada's oldest permanent force infantry regiment. Elements of the regiment garrisoned Saint-Jean-sur-Richelieu from 1884 to 1908 and in 1924.	

=== Plaques ===
Plaque	Description
Fort Saint-Jean (Quebec) plaque 24063-025	Built in 1748 during the French régime. During the 1837 rebellion, French-Canadian nationalists of the Parti Patriote planned to attack Fort Saint-Jean, then under British control with British troops.; The plan was not executed: "En 1839, des travaux sont entrepris au Fort Saint-Jean dans le but d'y édifier un important camp militaire qui pourrait contrer toute tentative de rébellion ultérieure."
24063-008 Fort Saint-Jean	A bronze plaque on a slab commemorating Fort Saint-Jean was erected by the Historic Sites and Monuments Board of Canada in 1926 and replaced in 1980.

=== Naval, military, and air memorials ===
Military Vehicles	Description	Graphic
Air Defense Anti-Tank System (ADATS)	Near Dextraze pavilion	
Anchor of HMCS Bonaventure	HMCS Bonaventure. Royal Military College Saint-Jean. This anchor is one of the two anchors of HMCS Bonaventure, a Majestic-class aircraft carrier. First built for the Royal Navy as HMS Powerful, this aircraft carrier served the Royal Canadian Navy and Canadian Forces Maritime Command from 1957 to 1970. She was the last aircraft carrier to serve Canada. This starboard side anchor of "The Bonnie" was donated by the Canadian Forces Maritime Command 6 May 1998 and is located at the Massey Building, Musée Fort-Saint-Jean Pavilion Les Forges.	
Plaque on stockless anchor of HMCS Bonaventure	Plaque on stockless anchor of HMCS Bonaventure at Royal Military College Saint-Jean, Saint-Jean-sur-Richelieu, Quebec, Canada. HMCS Bonaventure was a Majestic-class aircraft carrier built for the Royal Navy as HMS Powerful. She served in the Royal Canadian Navy and Canadian Forces Maritime Command from 1957 to 1970 and was the third and the last aircraft carrier to serve Canada. The anchor depicted is the starboard anchor of "The Bonnie" and is located by the Massey Building, Les Forges Musée Fort-Saint-Jean Pavilion. The anchor of "The Bonnie" was donated to the museum by the Canadian Forces Maritime Command on 6 May 1998.	
Admiralty pattern anchors of HMS Fury	Commander William Edward Parry, RN, FRS abandoned his beset HMS Fury at "Fury Beach", Somerset Island, Nunavut in 1825. Fury's anchors are on display at RMC Saint-Jean parade field.	
Plaque at HMS Fury anchors	Commander William Edward Parry, RN, FRS abandoned his beset HMS Fury at "Fury Beach", Somerset Island, Nunavut in 1825. Fury's anchors and plaque are on display at RMC Saint-Jean parade field.	
Ordnance QF 17-pounder	These 75mm anti-tank cannons were used during the Second World War.	
AVGP M-130 a Canadian armoured personnel carrier	borders parade square near Richelieu River	
AVGP Grizzly, a Canadian armoured personnel carrier	borders parade square near Richelieu River	
Avro Canada CF-100 Canuck	Designed and manufactured in Canada after 1952; It could reach a speed of 1046 km/h at 16,460m.	
Leopard 1	by staff residences	
Canon-obusier	English bronze shell-gun cannon, howitzer was manufactured 1841–1846.	
Cannon	This German 77 mm cannon circa 1916 was a Great War prize.	
Centurion tank	Canada purchased Centurion tanks in 1950 to replace Sherman tanks.; Four men were required to operate the 53-ton, 35 km/h tank with a V-12 Rolls-Royce motor, deploying 20-pound ammunition.	
M109 howitzer M109A4	by staff residences	
M4 Sherman tank	Manufactured in the United States, used by Canada during the Second World War; Five men were required to operate the 33 ton, 40 km/h tank deploying 76 mm munition.	
Naval signal cannon	This six-shot cannon launched projectiles from HMCS Mackenzie to signal the presence of the Navy.; It is used at RMC Saint-Jean to celebrate the graduation of officer cadets.	

== Commandants ==
With college numbers and rank held as commandant

Name	Year	Significance	Photo
H11171 Colonel Marcelin L. Lahaie, DSO, CD	1952–1957	First Commandant of Royal Military College Saint-Jean. The Lahaie Pavilion, built in 1972, is named in his honour.	Marcelin L. Lahaie
Group Captain Jean G. Archambault, AFC, CD	1957–1960		
Captain J.A.T. Marcel Jetté, CD	1960–1963		
H12481 Colonel J. Armand Ross, DSO, CD (Honorary 1975)	1963–1966	Brigadier General Armand Ross's DSO was for his actions at Zutphen, Netherlands	
Colonel Roland Antoine Reid, C.M., C.V.O., MC, CD, ADC	1966–1968	Founding president of Canadian Battlefields Foundation	
H12882 Colonel Jacques Chouinard, CD, ADC (Honorary 1973)	1968–1970		
H14129 Colonel Gérard Charles Édouard Thériault CD, ADC (Honorary 1975)	1970–1971	As General, he served as Chief of the Defence Staff from 1983 to 1986. He was President of AEG Canada Inc. 1986–1995.	
3814 & H12478 Brigadier-General Jean-Paul A. (Jack) Cadieux, CD, ADC (RMC 1957)	1971–1973		
Colonel J. Arthur R. Vandal, CD, ADC	1973–1975		
4377 Lieutenant General Richard J. Evraire, CD (CMR/RMC 1959)	1975–1978	In 2012, he was added to the wall of honour at the Royal Military College of Canada.	
3759 Colonel Charles-Eugène Savard, OMM, CD, ADC (CMR 1957)	1978–1981		
5359 Colonel (Ret'd) J. Yvon Durocher, CD, ADC (CMR/RMC 1962)	1981–1983		
5643 Colonel (Ret'd) Rudolphe J. Parent, OMM, CD, ADC (CMR/RMC 1963)	1983–1986		
6116 Colonel (Ret'd) J.L.H. Claude Archambault, OMM, CD, ADC (CMR/RMC 1964)	1986–1989		
H7860 Brigadier-General (ret'd) Senator Roméo Dallaire (CMR RMC 1969)	1989–1991	Senator, educator, author	
6496 Brigadier-General (Ret'd) Charles J.C.A. Émond CD (CMR/RMC 1965)	1991–1994		
8738 Colonel (Ret'd) J.Marcel Parisien (CMR RMC 1971)	1995		
12603 Colonel J.U. François Pion OMM, CD (RMC 1980)	2007–2010		
14154 Col Guy Maillet, CD (CMR/RMC 1983)	2010–2013		
17312 Colonel M.A.J. (Jennie) Carignan, OMM MSM, CD (RMC 1986–1990)	2013–2015	2009–2010 First woman in Canadian Forces history to command a combat arms unit in theater, Task Force Kandahar Engineer Regiment – Afghanistan 2011 – The Women's Executive Network – Canada's Top 100 Most Powerful Women – (Xstrata Nickel Trailblazers & Trendsetters Award)	
18562 Colonel Simon Bernard (CMR 1993)	2015–2017	Developed the Chief Warrant Officer Robert-Osside Profession of Arms Institute	
18087 Colonel Gervais Carpentier CD(CMR/RMC 1992)	2017–2019	In the fall of 2018, RMC Saint-Jean started offering the International Studies program, reintroducing university programs at RMC Saint-Jean	
20830 Brigadier general Nicolas Joseph Jean-Louis Pilon, MSM, CD (RMC 1996)	2019–2021	During Bgen Pilon's tenure, RMC Saint-Jean returned to university status and saw the first graduating class since 1995 graduate.	
21316 Colonel Gaétan Bédard, CD (CMR/RMC 1999)	2021–		

== Notable people ==
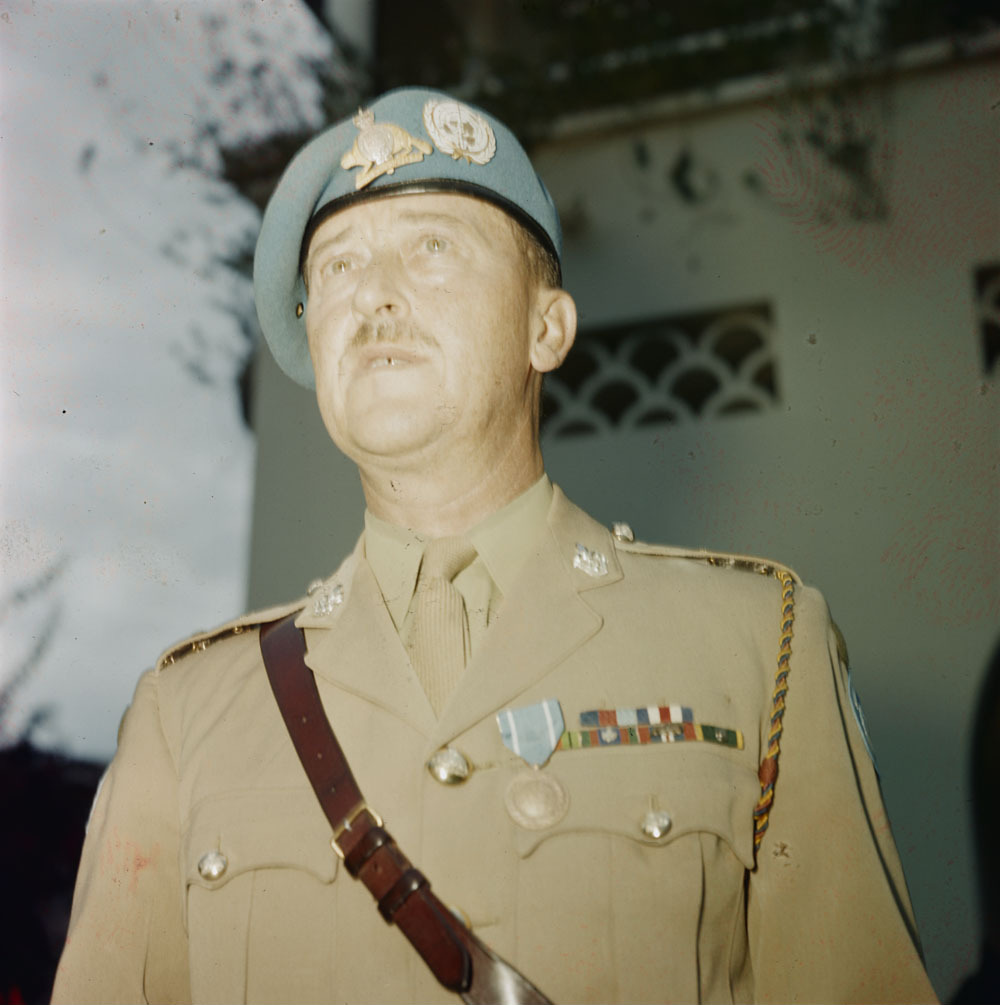
Jean Berthiaume in 1960

- Charles H. Belzile
- Jean Berthiaume
- François Bonnardel
- Jennie Carignan
- Roméo Dallaire
- Joseph A. Day
- Mike Brissette

== Hall of Fame ==
Royal Military College Saint-Jean inaugurated its Hall of Fame on 7 September 2013. Potential candidates must have studied at, been employed as a member of the faculty or staff at, or have had a notable involvement with Royal Military College Saint-Jean over the course of its existence since 1952. The Hall of Fame contributors include the Collège militaire royal de Saint-Jean Ex-Cadet Foundation, the Class of 1963 and the Fort Saint-Jean Branch of the RMC Club.

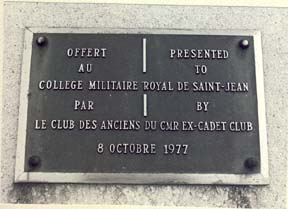
Plaque presented to Royal Military College Saint-Jean by ex-cadet club, 8 October 1977

Student #	Name	Induction
H7543	Hon. Joseph A. Day, Senator	2013
12320	General Walt Natynczyk	2013
4377	Lieutenant general Richard J. Evraire	2013
H15198	Professor Jacques Castonguay, former Royal Military College Saint-Jean Principal	2013
H7860	Lieutenant-general, Hon. Roméo Dallaire, OC, CMM, GOQ, MSC, BSc, Senator	2013
7502	Jacques Lyrette, B. Eng, M. Eng, FCAE	
8008	Serge Bernier PhD, FRSC, COPA, CD	
7196	Gilles Ouimet P. Eng., MBA, FCPA	
H12478	Brigadier-General Jean-Paul A. Cadieux	
N/A	Sir David Daniel Ruddy, BSc, MA, PhD, KC*HS, KCLJ, FRSA, FRSAI, FSA Scot.	
	Lieutenant-general J.O. Michel Maisonneuve CMM, MSC, CD	2022
	Major-General Lise Bourgon CMM, MSC, CD	2022
	Lieutenant-general Guy Robert Thibault CMM, MSC, CD	2022
	Lieutenant-general Stuart Beare, CMM, MSC, MSM, CD	2022
	Mrs Hélène Ladouceur, Manager	2023
8276	Captain(N) Marc Garneau, CC, CD	2023
	Lieutenant-Colonel (ret'd) Hal Klepak, Ph.D., OC, CD	2024

=== Alumni ===
Shown with college numbers.

Student #	Name	College Year	Significance	
7861	Lieutenant-General Senator Roméo Dallaire, OC, CMM, GOQ, MSC, BSc	CMR RMC	Senator, Former Commander of UN Mission to Rwanda, author of Shake Hands with the Devil and They Fight Like Soldiers, They Die Like Children.	Roméo Dallaire
8276	Captain(N) Marc Garneau CC, CD, PhD, F.C.A.S.I., MP	CMR RMC 1970	Canadian astronaut aboard Space Shuttles Challenger and Endeavour, logged nearly 700 hours in space; NASA Exceptional Service Medal in 1997	Marc Garneau
3776	Vice-Admiral Hugh MacNeil CMM	CMR 1957	Senior Canadian naval officer	
5105	Doctor Jack Granatstein OC, PhD, LL.D., F.R.S.C.	CMR RMC 1961	Canadian historian	
9573	Steven MacLean, FRCGS	CMR 1973	Canadian astronaut	Steven MacLean
4393	Doctor Desmond Morton, OC, CD, FRSC, PhD	CMR RMC 1959	Canadian historian	
12320	General Walter Natynczyk OMM, MSC, CD	CMR RRMC 1979	Chief of the Defence Staff; Deputy Commanding General of the Multi-National Corps during Operation Iraqi Freedom	Walter Natynczyk
H12878	Colonel Jean Berthiaume, OBE, KStJ CD	CMR 1952	First Administrative Director at the CMR, Commandant of the 1st Battalion, Royal 22^{e} Régiment, Chief of Staff of the ONUC mission in 1960, Commandant of the Quebec Western District	JA Berthiaume CC1-155-1986
18095	Sylvain Charlebois, PhD	CMR RMC 1992	Canadian Researcher, author, columnist for La Presse and Toronto Sun	
17312	Lieutenant-general Jennie Carignan OMM MSC MSM CD	CMR 1990	Chief of Staff of Army Operations (2016–2018), Commander NATO Mission Iraq (26 November 2019 – Present). First female general from a combat trade.	
	Sylvain Laporte	CMR, RMC	11th President of the Canadian Space Agency	
18087	Brigadier General Gervais Carpentier, CD	CMR 1992	Senior military officer, Canadian National Military Representative to Supreme Headquarters Allied Powers Europe	
21316	Colonel Gaétan Bédard, CD	CMR, RMC 1999	Senior military officer	
10468	Major-General Jerry S.T. Pitzul, CMM CD QC	CMR 1975	Judge-Advocate-General from 1998 to 2006	
14872	Lieutenant-Colonel Pierre Lemieux, MP	CMR 1985	Member of Parliament for Glengarry—Prescott—Russell	
6454	Lieutenant-General William Charles Leach CMM, CD	CMR, RMC 1965	Chief of the Land Staff of the Canadian Forces	
6097	Lieutenant-General Paul Addy, CMM, CD	CMR, RMC 1964	Senior military officer	
18056	Dominic JL Arpin	CMR 1987	TV host, journalist, movie columnist	Dominic Arpin en 《On est tous debout》- 2
6090	The Right Reverend George L.R. Bruce, CD	CMR, RMC 1965	Diocesan Bishop of Ontario	
6014	Lieutenant-General Fred Sutherland CMM, CD	CMR, RMC 1965	Vice Chief of the Defence Staff, Commander, Air Command	
	Lieutenant-general Guy Robert Thibault CMM, MSC, CD	CMR, RMC 1982	Vice Chief of the Defence Staff	

=== Faculty ===
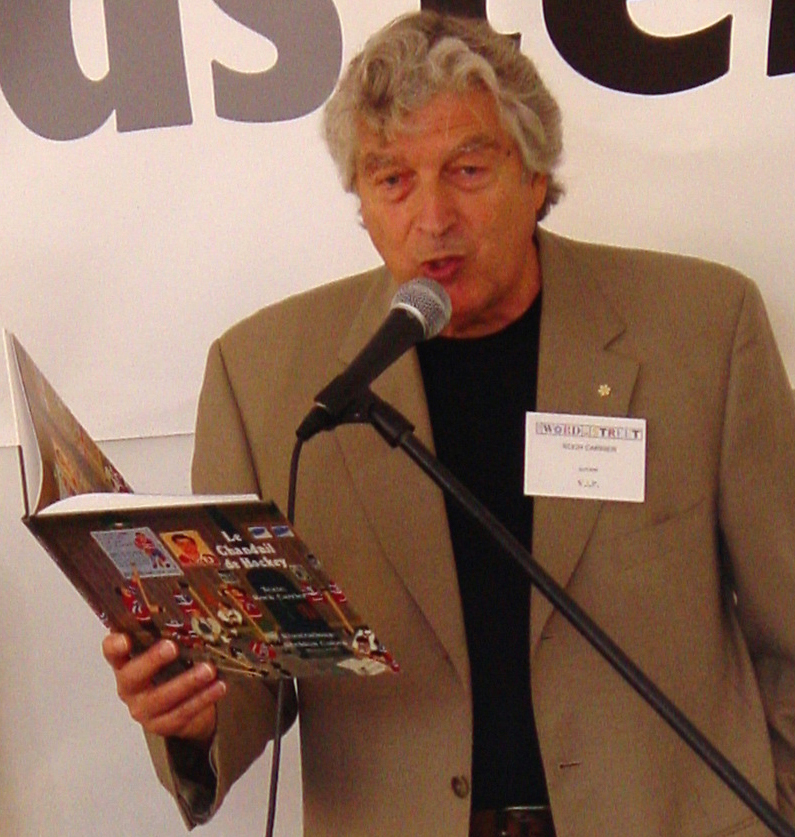
Roch Carrier in 2006

- Roch Carrier, author of Le Chandail de hockey or The Hockey Sweater, and later National Librarian of Canada.
- Janine Krieber, wife of former Liberal Party leader Stéphane Dion.

== In fiction and popular culture ==
The College's central place in Canadian military circles has made it the setting for novels, plays, films and other cultural works.

- 4377 Lt. Gen. Richard J. Evraire, CD (CMR/RMC 1959) wrote the play Chambre 204 (Saint-Jean-Sur-Richelieu: Editions Mille Roches, 1982) inspired by his time at the Royal Military College Saint-Jean.

== Coat of arms and flag ==
Coat of arms of Royal Military College Saint-Jean
Adopted 15 May 2008 Crest A dexter arm embowed vambraced and gauntleted proper holding a sprig of three maple leaves Or all ensigned by the Royal Crown proper Escutcheon Azure two swords in saltire Argent hilts and pommels Or surmounted by an open book proper bound and edged Or all between two maple leaves in pale and two fleurs-de-lis in fess Or, on a chief Argent three mural crowns Azure masoned Or Motto Vérité Devoir Vaillance Badge Azure two swords in saltire Argent hilts and pommels Or surmounted by an open book proper bound and edged Or all between two maple leaves in pale and two fleurs-de-lis in fess Or, on a chief Argent three mural crowns Azure masoned Or; Symbolism This motto is used by Canadian military colleges. The structure of the crest is typical of Canadian military colleges, this one distinguished by the torse's colours and the gold maple leaves.

Flag of RMC Saint-Jean

== Books ==
- H15198 Dr. Jacques Castonguay "Pourquoi a-t-on fermé le Collège militaire de Saint-Jean?" Montreal, Art Global, 2005
- H15198 Dr. Jacques Castonguay "Le Collège militaire royal de Saint-Jean" Meridien 1989
- H15198 Dr. Jacques Castonguay "Le Collège militaire royal de Saint-Jean: une université à caractère différent" Septentrion, 1992 ISBN 2-921114-78-X, 9782921114783
- H15198 Jacques Castonguay "The unknown Fort, Editions du Levrier" 1966
- H15198 Jacques Castonguay "Le Defile 1952–1972 College Militaire Royal de St Jean 20th Anniversary Yearbook" 1972
- H15198 Jacques Castonguay "Les defies du Fort Saint-Jean, Editions du Richelieu" 1975
- Peter J.S. Dunnett, "Royal Roads Military College 1940–1990, A Pictorial Retrospective" (Royal Roads Military College, Victoria, British Columbia, 1990)
- 4377 Colonel Richard J. Evraire, CD (CMR/RMC 1959) "Chambre 204" (Saint-Jean-Sur-Richelieu: Editions Mille Roches, 1982)
- Jean-Yves Gravel. "La fondation du Collège militaire royale de Saint Jean." Revue d'histoire de l'amérique française 27, no. 2 (sept. 1973).
- H16511 Dr. Richard A. Preston "To Serve Canada: A History of the Royal Military College since the Second World War", Ottawa, University of Ottawa Press, 1991.
- H16511 Dr. Richard A. Preston, "Canada's Royal Military College: A History of the Royal Military College" Toronto, University of Toronto Press, 1969.
- 4669 Toivo Roht (CMR RMC 1960) "Collège militaire royal de Saint-Jean, Royal Roads Military College and Royal Military College of Canada 1955–2006" 2007
- H1877 R. Guy C. Smith (editor) "As You Were! Ex-Cadets Remember" In 2 Volumes. Volume I: 1876–1918. Volume II: 1919–1984. Royal Military College of Canada Kingston, Ontario. The Royal Military Colleges Club of Canada 1984

== See also ==
- Canadian Military Colleges
  - Royal Military College of Canada
  - Royal Roads Military College
- Royal Naval College of Canada
- Canadian Interuniversity Sport
- Canadian government scientific research organizations
- Canadian university scientific research organizations
- Canadian industrial research and development organizations
- History of military education in Canada
