= Marcelin L. Lahaie =

Canadoan military officer (1913–1973)

Marcelin Louis Lahaie
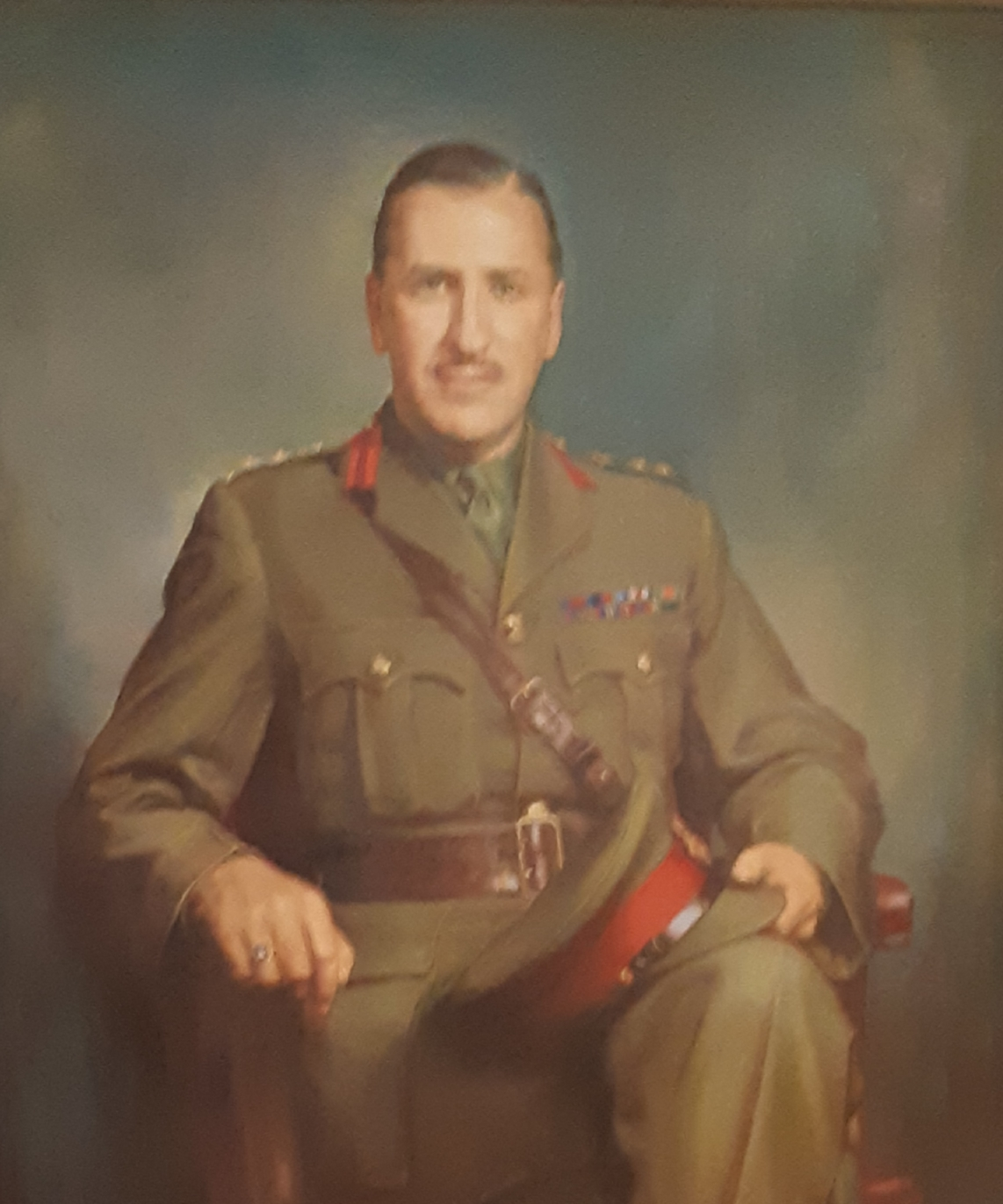
- Born: 1913; Buckingham, Quebec, Canada
- Died: 8 October 1973 (aged 59–60) Montreal, Quebec
- Allegiance: Canada
- Branch: Canadian Army
- Rank: Brigadier-General
- Commands: Royal Military College Saint-Jean; CFB Valcartier; 79th Field Artillery Regiment
- Conflicts: Second World War
- Awards: Distinguished Service Order; CD
- Spouse: Kathleen Lahaie Featherston

Marcelin Louis Lahaie DSO, CD was a Canadian officer who served in the Royal Canadian Artillery during the Second World War. He also served as the first commandant of the Royal Military College Saint-Jean and also the commandant of CFB Valcartier.

== Education ==
Marcelin L. Lahaie was born in 1913 in Buckingham, Quebec. In 1932, he began his studies at MCGill University in engineering, until 1935. He then studied for a small period of time at the University of Montréal.

== Military career ==
Lahaie joined the Canadian Army in October 1940 as a second lieutenant. He was trained until 1942, when he was deployed overseas as a captain in the Artillery. In 1944, as a major, he commanded a battery in the 4th Medium Regiment, RCA until 1945. After the war, he also served as the commander of the 79th Field Artillery Regiment, which in 1951 became part of the NATO force present in Germany Lahaie then opened a new military college in Canada, becoming the first commandant of the Royal Military College Saint-Jean when it opened in 1952.

== Royal Military College Saint-Jean ==
The Government of Canada, under Prime Minister Louis St. Laurent, decided to create a bilingual military college in the province of Quebec. Newly promoted Colonel Lahaie was entrusted with the opening of the new military college with the first Officer Cadets set to enter the college November 15, 1952. The college opened early on 15 September 1952, and was granted a 3-year program composed of one preparatory year and two university years from the Canadian government due to the efforts of Lahaie. The Lahaie Pavilion, named in his honour, was built at the Royal Military College Saint-Jean in 1972. The Lahaie Pavilion houses the college library, offices, computer labs, and some classrooms.

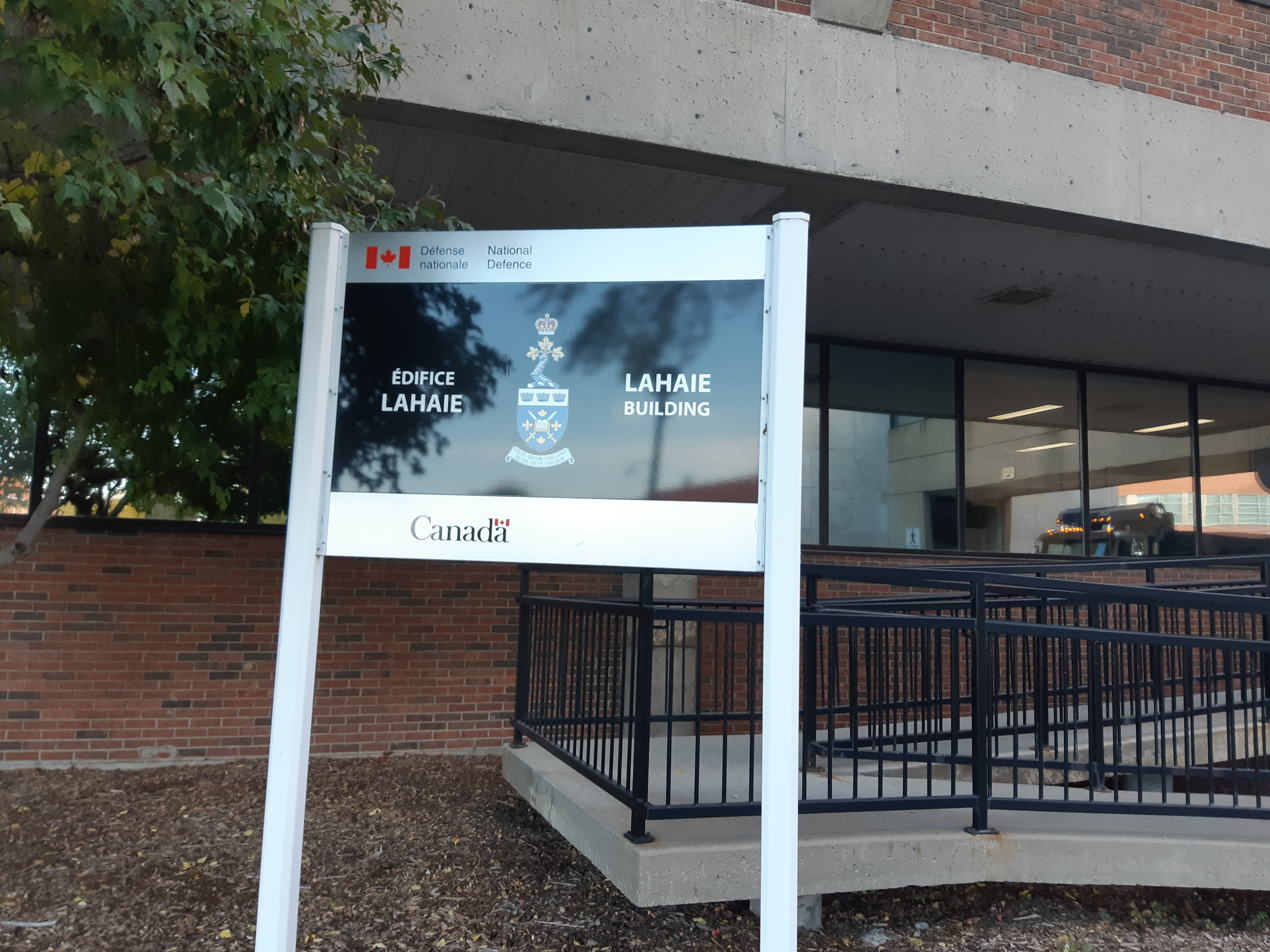
Lahaie Building at RMCSJ
