= Royal Naval College of Canada =

Naval college in Canada

- Type: Naval college
- Active: 1911–1922
- Commandant: Commander Edward Atcherley Eckersall Nixon, RN (1878–1924)
- Location: Halifax, Nova Scotia 1911–17; Kingston, Ontario 1918; Esquimalt, BC 1918–22
- Campus: Halifax at HMC Dockyard; HMCS Stone Frigate in Kingston naval dockyard; Esquimalt naval dockyard

The Royal Naval College of Canada (RNCC) was established by the Department of the Naval Service after the formation of the Royal Canadian Navy (RCN) in 1910. The college was placed under the auspices of the Minister of Naval Service (and of Marine and Fisheries) and controlled by the Director of the Naval Service, Rear-Admiral Charles Kingsmill. The initial goal was to train a new generation of Canadian naval officers for the RCN. The college existed from 1911 to 1922 and educated about 150 students until it was closed due to declining numbers and budget cuts by the government of Canada. As the RCN did not have large ships of its own other than HMCS Niobe and HMCS Rainbow, the cadets followed a course of study that would qualify them for eventual service on British warships. The graduated midshipmen were required to serve approximately one year of "big ship duty" as part of their training.

The college was housed in a refurbished three storey brick building, the former naval hospital, at the north end of HMC Dockyard. The structure was built in 1863 to replace the original hospital destroyed in an 1815 fire. However, the building was heavily damaged in the 1917 Halifax Explosion. In the Spring of 1918, the college was temporarily moved to facilities at the Royal Military College (RMC) in Kingston, Ontario. In September, the college was relocated to the naval dockyard at Esquimalt, British Columbia. The college was closed in 1922 after a parliamentary decision.

== History ==
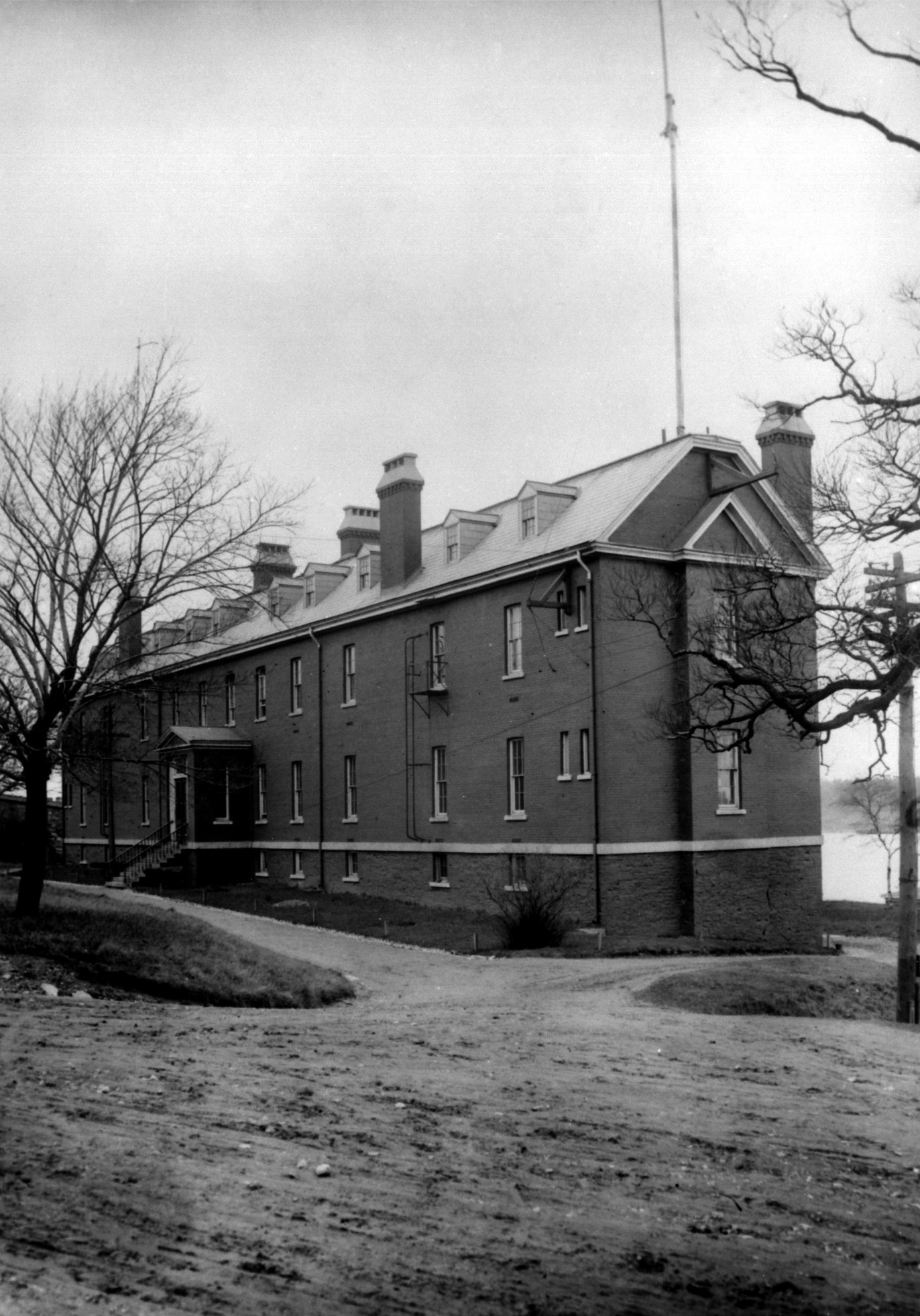
Royal Naval College of Canada c. 1913

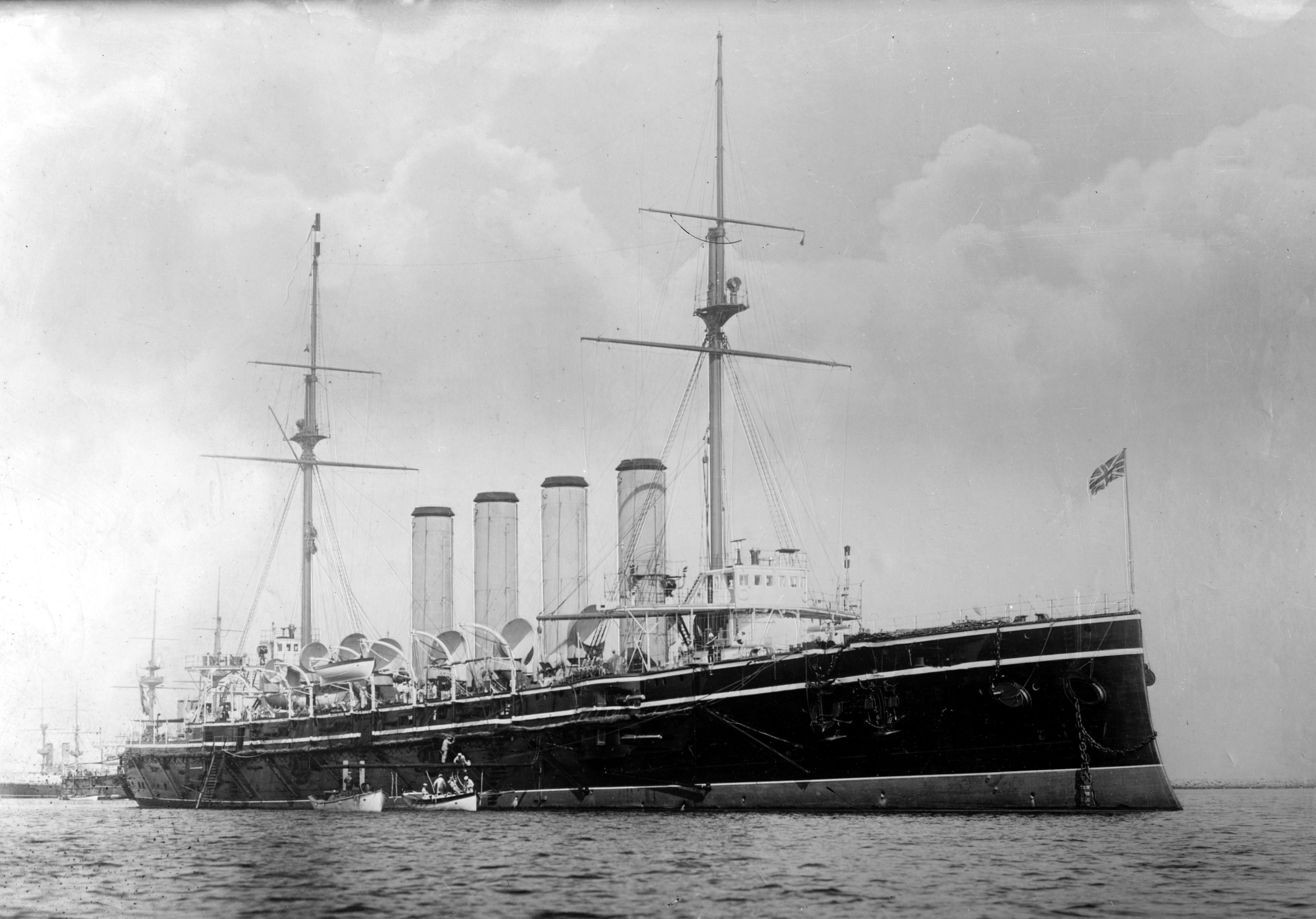
HMCS Niobe

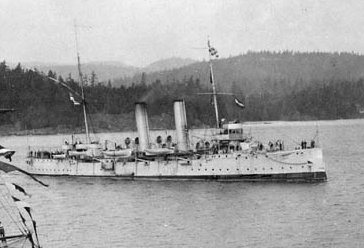
HMCS Rainbow

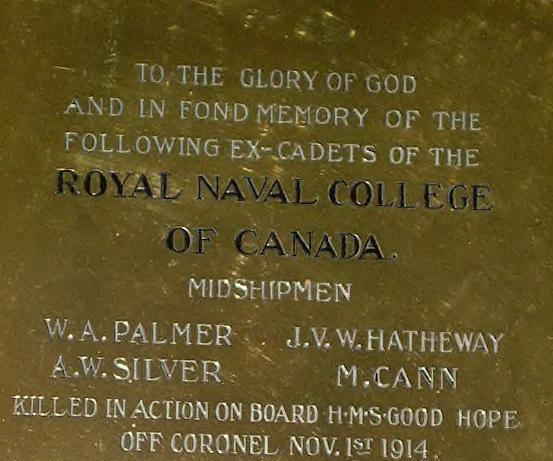
Royal Naval College of Canada plaque Battle of Coronel

The King’s permission was obtained to add the prefix 'Royal' to the title of the Naval College of Canada in October 1910, with the abbreviation being 'R.N.C.C.' The naval college was established at Halifax, Nova Scotia in 1911. RNCC was co-commanded by Lieutenant Commander Edward Atcherley Eckersall Nixon, RN (1878–1924) and Officer-In-Charge, Commander Edward Harrington Martin (1859–1921), with the assistance of the Director of Studies. Martin was also the Senior Captain-In-Charge of HMC Dockyard and spent very little time at the college. For all intents, Nixon or "Nix", as he was affectionately referred to by the students and staff, was the ever-present person of authority and inspiration throughout the college's history. In 1915, the staff included a commander, an instructor commander, an engineer commander, two instructor lieutenant commanders, a paymaster lieutenant commander, a lieutenant, an engineer lieutenant, three civilian masters, a chief boatswain, a boatswain and a warrant writer.

The college facilities at Halifax consisted of workshops, drawing office, gymnasium, sick quarters, boathouse and a playing field. After the 1917 Halifax Explosion, the students were sent home for Christmas until arrangements could be made to move the college. Classes were also held on HMCS Niobe, a ship used to train the cadets. This ship was also damaged in the explosion. What could be salvaged was moved to HMCS Stone Frigate at the Royal Military College of Canada (RMC) in Kingston. Classes reconvened in the Spring of 1918.

In September 1918 the RNCC was moved to a building in the Royal Canadian Navy dockyard at Esquimalt. Classes were also held on the Dominion Government Ship Naden, commissioned as a tender for training in sail. The College was closed in 1922. In the years between 1922 and 1940, Canadian naval cadets went to the Royal Navy's Royal Naval College in Portsmouth.

== Program ==
The Royal Naval College of Canada was established to impart a complete education in Naval Science. Candidates were British subjects between 14 and 16 years of age. The terms and curriculum approximated those of Naval Colleges in Britain save for the initial two year rather than three-year program which was followed by a training year in a H.M. cruiser. Initially a Naval career was compulsory. Once the obligation for cadets to follow a naval career was removed, the program was lengthened to three years beginning with the August term of 1914 (Fifth Term). Arrangements were made with certain universities and with the Admiralty to receive cadets. The course provided a grounding in Applied Science, Engineering, Mathematics, Navigation, History and Modern Languages and was accepted as qualifying for entry as second-year students in Canadian universities. The program aimed to develop physical and mental abilities, including discipline, the ability to obey and take charge, and honour. Candidates had to be between their fourteenth and sixteenth birthdays on 1 July following the examination.

Graduates were qualified to enter the Imperial or Canadian Service as midshipmen.

== Notable historical milestones ==
Year	Significance
1910	• The King's permission was obtained to add the prefix 'Royal' to the title of the Naval College of Canada. • The Naval Service Bill provided a naval college in order to train prospective officers in all branches of naval science, strategy and tactics. Two old cruisers, HMCS Niobe and HMCS Rainbow are purchased from the Admiralty to be used as training ships.
1911	On 19 January, twenty young men aged 14–16 years entered the newly established Royal Naval College of Canada at the HMC dockyard in Halifax, Nova Scotia. The original building was constructed in 1863 as a naval hospital.
1914	A bill in the House of Commons in Ottawa to close the RNCC was not passed, in part because Canada entered the First World War in August 1914. The college was saved mostly due to the vigorous efforts of Admiral Charles E. Kingsmill, Director of the Naval Service and Deputy Minister of the Naval Service, George J. Desbarates, with the able assistance of Minister of Marine and Fisheries, John Douglas Hazen.
1917	On 6 December, a collision between the French munitions ship, SS Mont-Blanc, and the Belgian Relief ship, SS Imo resulted in an explosion that devastated the North End of Halifax and parts of Dartmouth. Significant damage was done to the RNCC facilities.
1918	The RNCC was temporarily moved to HMCS Stone Frigate in Kingston, Ontario in the spring. In September, the RNCC was relocated to Esquimalt Naval Dockyard. However, the new living quarters were not completed and the cadets had to make their home aboard HMCS Rainbow. until they could move to a brick building formerly used as a drill deck.
1922	The Royal Naval College of Canada was closed by a decision made in the House of Commons.

== Facilities ==
Building	Year	Description	Honours
HMCS Stone Frigate	1819–1924	Designed by architect Archibald Fraser as Royal Dockyard naval supply storehouse; Served as facilities for the Royal Naval College of Canada 1918; Presently Royal Military College of Canada dormitory-housing one squadron, located to East of Parade Square.	Registry of Historic Places of Canada

== Commandants ==
Name	Years	Significance
Lieutenant Commander Edward Atcherley Eckersall Nixon (RN, [ret.])	1911–1922	The Nixon building at the Royal Roads Military College was named in his honour in 1949. He was co-commandant of RNCC with then Commander Edward Harrington Martin. Nixon achieved seniority as commander on 1 August 1915.
Commander Edward Harrington Martin (RN, [ret.])	1911–1917 (1918 at RMC, Kingston)	Martin, the Officer-In-Charge of RNCC, achieved seniority as captain on 31 December 1912. Commander Nixon received serious injuries as a result of the 1917 harbour explosion. During his recovery, Captain Martin temporarily took over the commandant's duties at RMC before the college was relocated to Esquimalt.

== Notable alumni ==
Notable alumni of the college are shown below.

Name	Grad	Significance
Rear Admiral Leonard W. Murray	1911–1913	Commander-in-Chief, Canadian Northwest Atlantic 1943–1945
Commodore Ronald Ian Agnew OBE	1911–1913	OBE Awarded as per Canada Gazette of 10 August 1935.
Vice Admiral George C. Jones	1911–1913	Chief of the Naval Staff 1944–1945; first RNCC graduate to command a ship in the RCN, HMCS Patrician
Lieutenant William McKinstry Heriot-Maitland-Dougall	1911–1913	killed on active service with his entire company of 29 officers and crew while in Command of HMS D3 off Le Havre on 12 March 1918
Vice Admiral Harold Taylor Wood Grant	1914–1917	Chief of Naval Staff 1947–1950
Vice Admiral Edmund Rollo Mainguy	1915–1917	Chief of Naval Staff 1951–1955

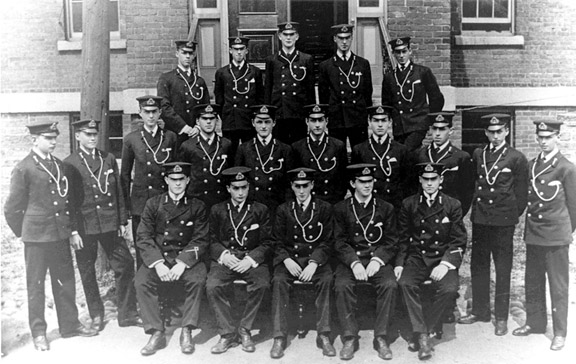
Royal Naval College of Canada. Class of 1911–13

59005-033 A brass plaque at St. Paul's Anglican Church in Esquimalt, BC, is dedicated to the four ex-cadets of the Royal Naval College of Canada and men of Her Majesty's Ship (HMS) Good Hope who were killed in action in 1914 as well as Lieutenant W.M. Maitland-Dougall killed in 1918. Four cadets of the first class of the Royal Navy College of Canada (1911–14), were the First Canadian Navy casualties in the First World War. Midshipman Malcolm Cann (RCNC 1911–14), Midshipman John V.W. Hatheway (RCNC 1911–14), Midshipman William Archibald Palmer (RCNC 1911–14), and Midshipman Arthur Wiltshire Silver (RCNC 1911–14), died when the British warship HMS Good Hope (1901) went down with no survivors, sunk by the German navy on 1 November 1914.

Another cadet was killed on active service with his company of 29 officers and crew while in Command of HMS D3 off Le Havre on 12 March 1918 at 23 years of age. An inquiry later found that Lieutenant (RCN) William McKinstry Heriot-Maitland-Dougall (1911–1914) had acted in the only manner possible to him. HMS D3 was sunk in error by French dirigible AT-9, which could not see D3's insignia because of the sub's reflection off the waves, and took her to be a U-boat firing upon it. The French had not been informed that D3 was assigned to their waters in the English Channel and were not aware that British submarines were identifying themselves with rockets as opposed to flashing lights.

== See also ==
- Canadian Military Colleges
- History of military education in Canada
- Royal Military College Saint-Jean
- Royal Naval Canadian Volunteer Reserve
- The Canadian Crown and the Canadian Armed Forces
