= History of military education in Canada =

This is a history of military education in Canada.

== Early efforts ==
Long before the Royal Military College was established in 1876, there were proposals for military colleges in Canada. Although the Assembly of Lower Canada decided to establish a military college in 1815, agreement upon its organization was blocked by religious and linguistic conflicts.

Captain A.G. Douglas, a former adjutant at the British military college at Great Marlow, recommended in 1816 the establishment of a military college open to Catholic and Protestant boys at Three Rivers in a disused government house with himself as superintendent. Douglas' college was intended as a boarding school to educate the young sons of officers, among others, in Latin, English language, French Language, History, Geography, Drawing and Mathematics.

In 1826, retired British navy and army officers who had settled in March township, near Ottawa, Ontario proposed a military college boarding school for boys on the Great Lakes on naval and military lines.

In late November 1863, a circular announced the intention to establish Schools of Military Instruction for militia officers. The schools' training program lasted up to three months; graduates received a "First Class" certificate for the ability to command a battalion, and a "Second Class" for company command. By 1866, schools were operational in Quebec City, Montreal, Kingston, and Toronto; those in Hamilton and London had been closed for lack of enrollment. The schools were judged to be inadequate by 1874; they opened only during the winter months, and higher quality education was required. In 1868, schools of Cavalry and Artillery were formed in Toronto and a school of artillery was formed in Montreal. Since these were not Boarding schools, students lived in the communities.

At a pre-Confederation of Canada military school in Halifax, Nova Scotia, adult male students drilled and attended lectures on drill commands, military records, court-martial, the Articles of War, discipline and punishments, promotion of non commissioned officers, military accounts and pay and messing. After Confederation, military schools were opened in Halifax and Saint John.

In 1870–71, Canadian militia staff replaced the British regulars who were recalled from overseas station. From December to May, six schools conducted officer training for cavalry, infantry and artillery. The British garrisons operated the schools at Halifax, Saint John, New Brunswick and Quebec. Canadian militia staff and former British army drill sergeants operated the schools at Montreal, Kingston and Toronto.

The first full-time units of the Canadian militia, A and B Batteries at Kingston and Quebec, organized gunnery schools on a year-round basis in which artillery courses lasted from 3–12 months with the possibility of extension. Colonel P Robertson-Ross, adjutant general of the militia (1870–3) recommended the schools be organized as tactical brigades of three arms and that infantry and cavalry schools should also be put on a permanent basis. The Canadian government did not accept his advice.

== Service colleges ==
In 1876, legislation was enacted to create the Military College of Canada, which became known as the Royal Military College of Canada in 1878.

In 1911, the Royal Naval College of Canada was established. It was shut down in 1922.

In 1940, HMCS Royal Roads was established, becoming the Royal Canadian Naval College in 1942, the RCN-RCAF Joint Services College in 1947, the Canadian Services College, Royal Roads in 1948, and the Royal Roads Military College in 1965. It was shut down after the end of the Cold War, and the last class graduated in 1995.

In 1952, the Collège militaire royal de Saint-Jean was established as a bilingual, tri-service military college.
