= Jennie Carignan =

Canadian general (born 1968)

General Jennie Carignan CMM MSC MSM CD
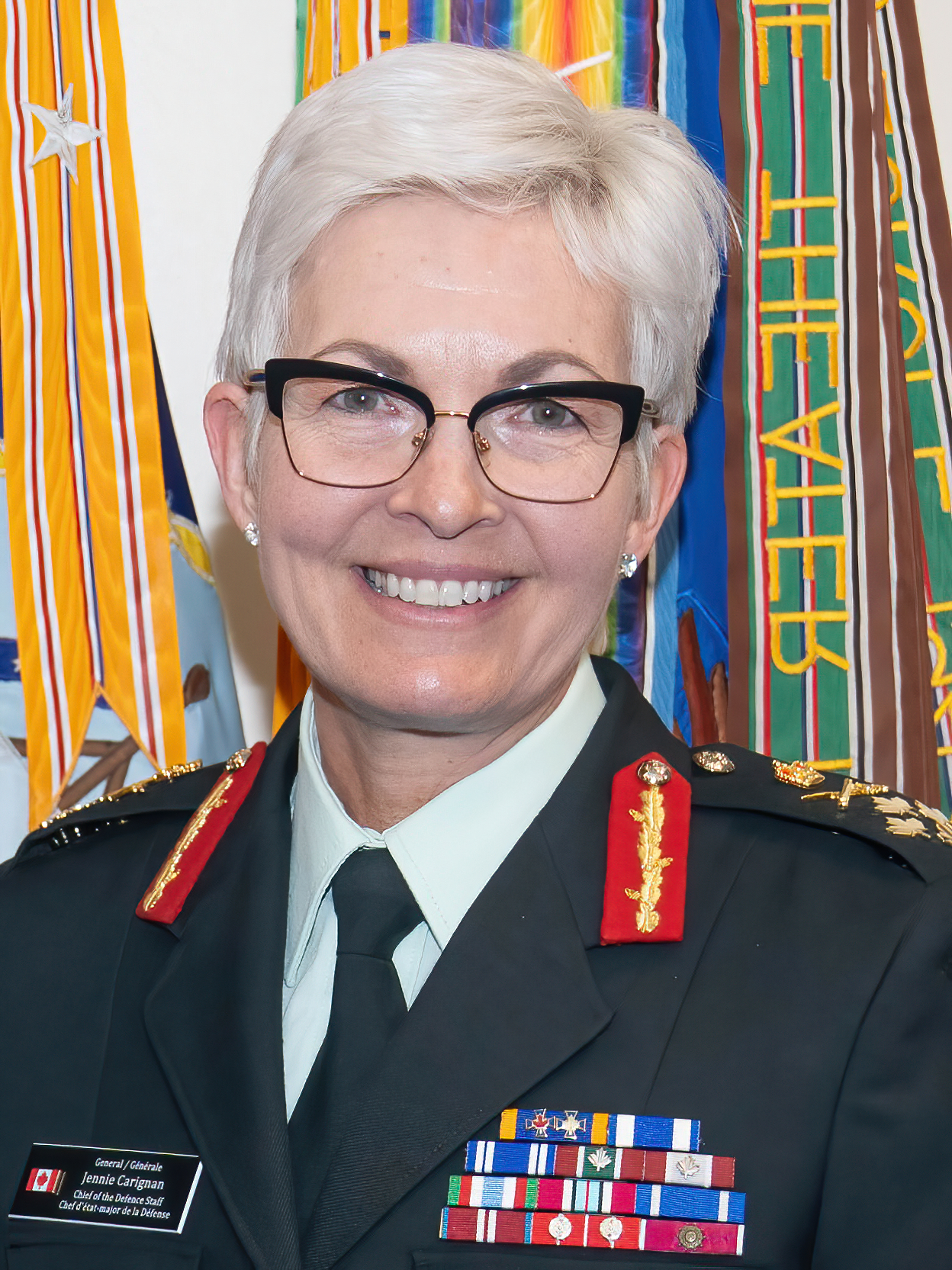
- Carignan in 2024
- Born: Marie Annabelle Jennie Carignan; 1968 (age 57–58); Asbestos, Quebec, Canada
- Education: Royal Military College of Canada (BEng); Université Laval (MBA); United States Army Command and General Staff College (ILE, MMAS)
- Spouse: Eric Lefrançois
- Children: 4
- Military career
- Allegiance: Canada
- Branch: Canadian Army
- Service years: 1986–present
- Rank: General
- Commands: Chief of the Defence Staff (2024–present); Chief, Professional Conduct and Culture (2021–2024); Commander, NATO Mission Iraq (2019–2020); Chief of Staff of Army Operations (2016–2018); Royal Military College Saint-Jean (2013–2016); 5 Combat Engineer Regiment (2008–2010)
- Awards: Commander of the Order of Military Merit; Meritorious Service Cross; Meritorious Service Medal; Canadian Forces' Decoration; Officer of the Legion of Merit (United States)

General Marie Annabelle Jennie Carignan (born 1968) is a Canadian Armed Forces (CAF) officer who has served as Chief of the Defence Staff (CDS) since July 2024. Born in Quebec, Carignan graduated as a military engineer from the Royal Military College of Canada (RMCC) in Kingston, Ontario. She served as an officer in combat engineering regiments in various Canadian military actions in the 1990s and 2000s including the Golan Heights, Bosnia and Afghanistan. As a full colonel, Carignan became Commandant of the Royal Military College Saint-Jean in 2013.

When Carignan was promoted to brigadier-general, in June 2016, she became the first Canadian female general from a combat command. She was promoted again in 2019, to major-general, and commanded NATO forces in Iraq. In 2021, she was promoted to lieutenant-general, and became CAF’s first chief for Professional Conduct and Culture. Prime Minister Justin Trudeau announced she would become the first woman to serve as CDS on 3 July 2024. The appointment and promotion to general took effect on 18 July 2024, with the change of command ceremony.

== Early life, education, and family ==
Marie Annabelle Jennie Carignan was born in 1968, and grew up in Asbestos, Quebec, in a French-speaking household. Growing up, the only career she considered aside from the military was dancing as she had learned ballet, lyrical and jazz dancing from the age of eight. She joined the Canadian Armed Forces in 1986 and graduated as a military engineer from the Royal Military College of Canada (RMCC) in Kingston, Ontario.

She received a commission in 1990 and served at the Canadian Forces Bases of Chilliwack and Valcartier. Carignan married Eric Lefrançois in 1990, having met while in the same platoon at military college and taking ballroom dance classes together while there. He later retired from the army to look after their four children. Two of their children, a son and a daughter, are also serving in the CAF.

== Military career ==
=== Junior and senior officer ===
She served as a peacekeeper in the United Nations Disengagement Observer Force in Golan Heights in 1993. She was to be posted to the United Nations Protection Force in Bosnia in 1995 but had to withdraw after becoming pregnant. Carignan was promoted to major in 1999 and awarded a Master of Business Administration degree from Laval University. She has also completed the Intermediate Learning Education (ILE) program at the United States Army Command and General Staff College and holds the degree of Master of Military Art and Science (MMAS) from the college's School of Advanced Military Studies.

She deployed to Bosnia in 2002 to clear explosive ordnance from farmers' fields. Carignan became the first female deputy commander of a combat arms unit when she became deputy commanding officer and acting commander of 5 Combat Engineer Regiment in 2003. She was promoted to the rank of lieutenant-colonel in 2005.

Carignan served as an instructor at the Canadian Land Force Command and Staff College in Kingston, Ontario, before she returned to 5 Combat Engineer Regiment as commanding officer in 2008. Between 2009 and 2010 she commanded the Task Force Kandahar Engineer Regiment in Afghanistan, being appointed deputy commander of 5 Canadian Mechanized Brigade Group upon her return.

Carignan was promoted to colonel in June 2011 and appointed chief of staff of Joint Task Force Central. In May 2012 she, and several other female Canadian Armed Forces members, toured Australia giving talks about their combat experiences in an effort to help promote women in combat positions, something Australia was still contemplating at the time. In July 2013, Carignan became commandant of the Royal Military College Saint-Jean and in the same year received the Hermès Award for excellence in administration. Carignan introduced sexual conduct training for all officer candidates and also reintroduced ballroom dance classes which had been discontinued in the 1990s.

=== General officer ===
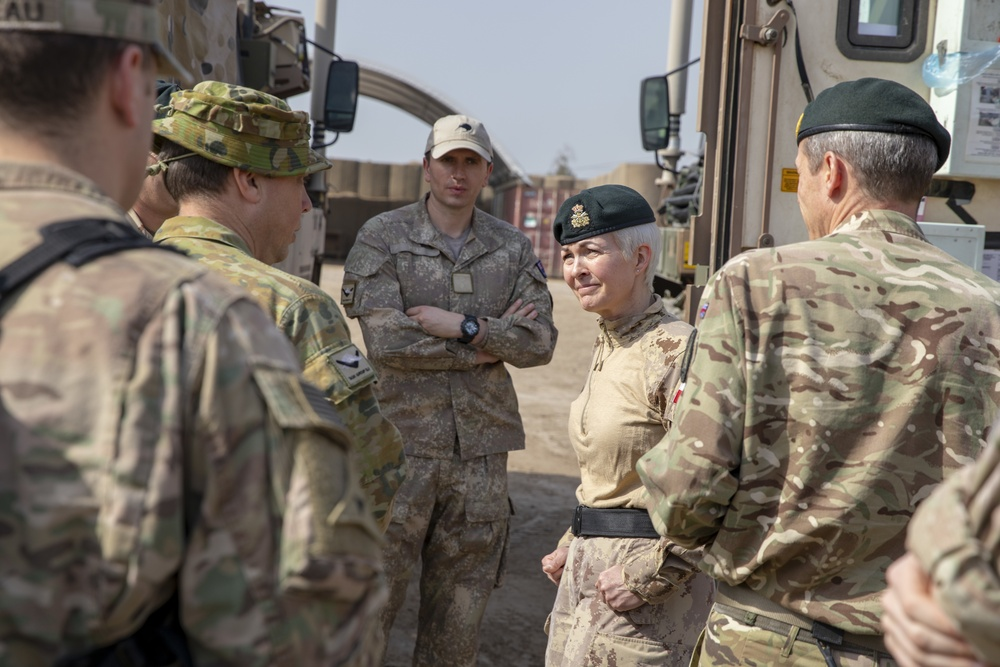
Major General Carignan visiting Camp Taji, Iraq, in 2020

Carignan was promoted to brigadier-general on 15 June 2016 and appointed chief of staff of army operations. She became the first female Canadian general from a combat (as opposed to technical) arm. Carignan was promoted to the rank of major-general on 15 August 2019 ahead of taking command of a training mission in Iraq.

She was promoted to lieutenant-general in 2021 upon her appointment to the newly created position of Chief for Professional Conduct and Culture, with the responsibility of preventing sexual assault in the military.

On 28 June 2024, news broke that Carignan would succeed General Wayne Eyre as Chief of the Defence Staff upon his retirement in July 2024. The official announcement from the Prime Minister’s Office occurred on 3 July 2024, and included the mention that she would be promoted to the rank of full general. Her appointment makes her the first female head of a national military force in any of the Five Eyes allied countries. Her promotion took effect on 18 July 2024, at the change in command ceremony held at the Canadian War Museum with Governor General Mary Simon officiating.

== Honours and decorations ==
Carignan has received the following orders and decorations during her military career:

Ribbon	Description	Notes
	Order of Military Merit (CMM)	Appointed Officer (OMM) on 1 June 2016; Promoted to Commander (CMM) on 21 September 2020
	Meritorious Service Cross (MSC)	Awarded on 16 June 2021
	Meritorious Service Medal (MSM)	Awarded on 2 April 2011
	General Campaign Star	South-West Asia; With Rotation Bar
	General Campaign Star – EXPEDITION	Operation IMPACT in Iraq
	Canadian Peacekeeping Service Medal	
	UN Disengagement Observation Force (UNDOF)	
	NATO Medal for the former Yugoslavia	
	Queen Elizabeth II Diamond Jubilee Medal	
	Canadian Forces' Decoration (CD)	with two Clasp for 32 years of service
	Legion of Merit – United States	Officer; Awarded 3 June 2022

She received an Honorary degree from Université Laval in 2019, and is a fellow of the Canadian Academy of Engineering.

Military offices
Preceded by Wayne Eyre	Chief of the Defence Staff; 2024–present	Incumbent
