= Canadian Military Colleges =

Military academies of Canada

The Canadian Military Colleges (CMC) are the military academies of Canada. They currently consist of the Royal Military College of Canada and the Royal Military College Saint-Jean.

== History ==
Canadian Military Colleges was formed in 1948, following the reorganization of the tri-services colleges of the Royal Canadian Navy, Royal Canadian Air Force and Canadian Army into a grouping, after World War II.

The CMC initially consisted of:

- Royal Military College of Canada (RMC) – formed in 1874
- Royal Roads Military College (RRMC) – 1940: HMCS Royal Roads; 1942: Royal Canadian Naval College; 1947: RCN-RCAF Joint Services College; 1948: Canadian Services College – Royal Roads; 1968: Royal Roads Military College.

In 1952, Collège militaire royal de Saint-Jean (CMR) was added to the CMC.

After 1995, the Department of National Defence disbanded the CMC, and all military training and education was re-directed to the Royal Military College of Canada in Kingston, Ontario. Royal Roads Military College was closed at that time, and the campus leased to Royal Roads University.

In July 2007, the federal government announced that the military college at St. Jean, which was closed in 1995, would reopen in fall 2007. Since 2007, Officer-cadets have been receiving training in a two-year program at the Royal Military College Saint-Jean in Saint-Jean-sur-Richelieu, Quebec.

== See also ==
- Royal Naval College of Canada
