= Fort Saint-Jean (Quebec) =

Historic military garrison in Quebec, Canada

Fort Saint-Jean (Québec)
- Saint-Jean-sur-Richelieu, Quebec, Canada
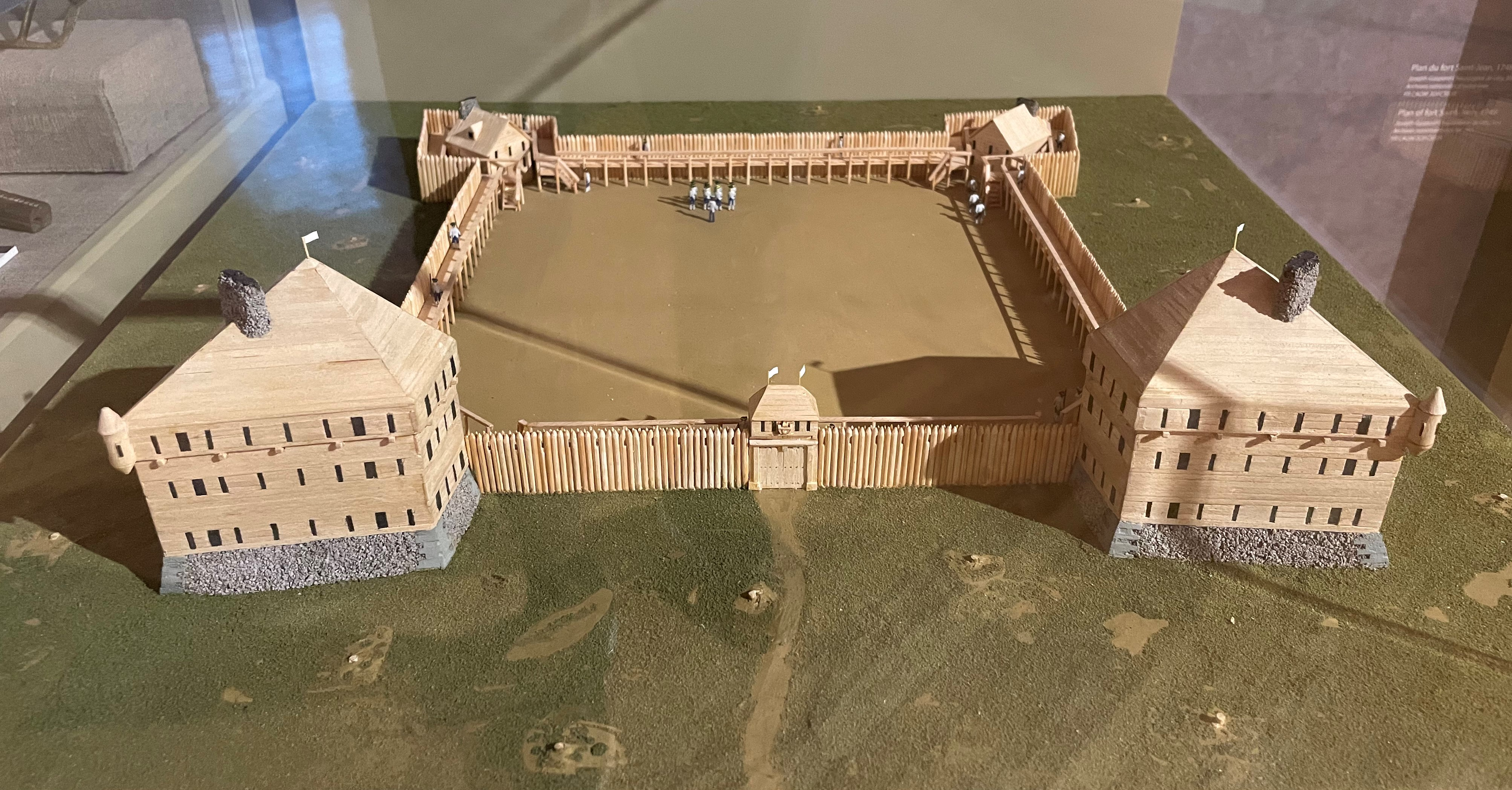
- Fort Saint-Jean on Richelieu River in Quebec circa 1748

Site information
- Type: Fort
- Controlled by: France; United Kingdom; Continental Army; Canada

Location
- Coordinates: 45°17′46″N 73°15′7″W

Site history
- Built: 1666 to 1775
- In use: 1666 to present day
- Battles/wars: Siege of Fort Saint-Jean

National Historic Site of Canada
- Official name: Fort Saint-Jean National Historic Site of Canada
- Designated: 1923

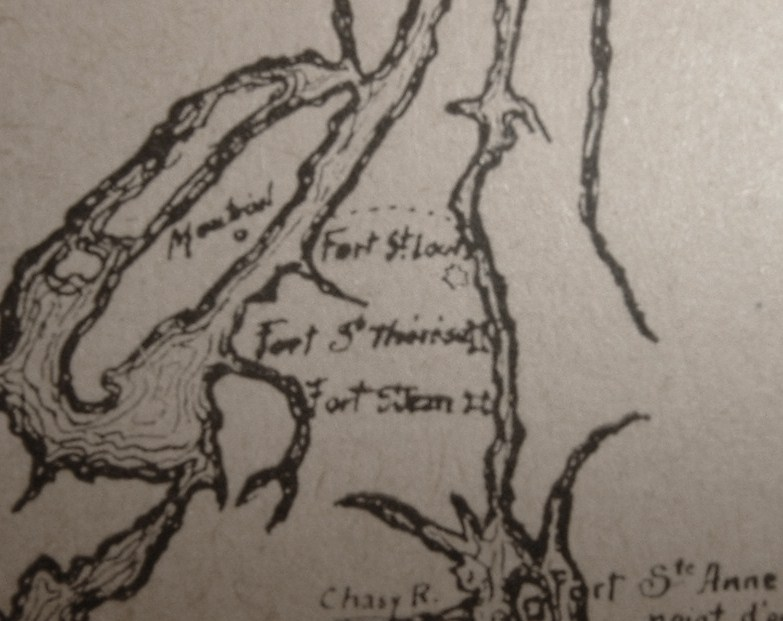
Map of Fort Saint-Jean and other forts on the Richelieu River circa 1666 for the campagne of the Regiment of Carignan-Salières

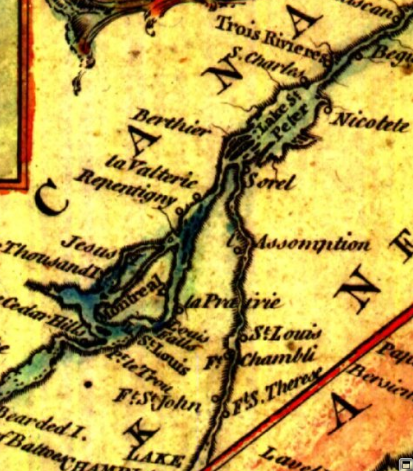
Detail of a 1759 map showing Fort Saint-John, Trois-Rivières and Sorel

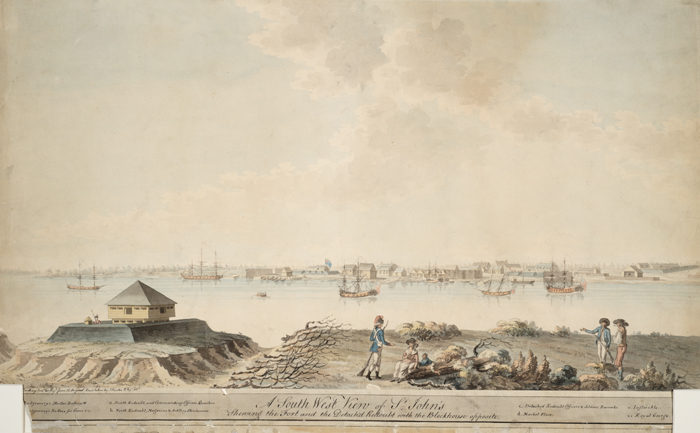
Fort Saint-Jean circa 1775 siege of the fort

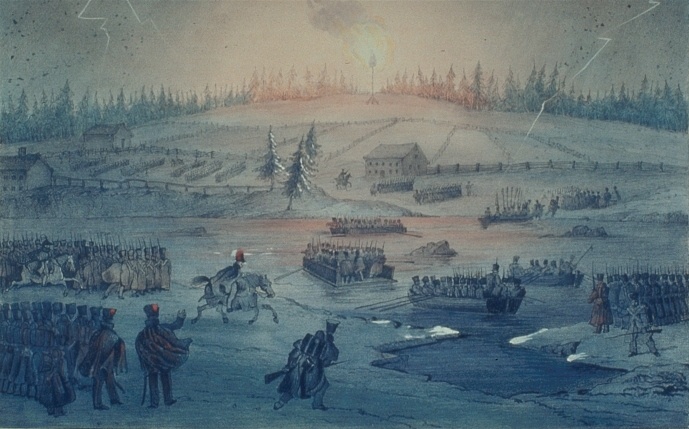
Passage of the Richelieu by night

Fort Saint-Jean (French pronunciation: [fɔʁ sɛ̃ ʒɑ̃]) is a fort in the Canadian province of Quebec located on the Richelieu River. The fort was first built in 1666 by soldiers of the Carignan-Salières Regiment of France who had travelled to New France to assist the young colony. It was part of a series of forts built along the Richelieu River. Over the years, it was destroyed and rebuilt several times, but it is, after Quebec City, the military site that has been occupied non-stop for the longest time in Canada. The fort is designated as a National Historic Site of Canada, and it currently houses the Royal Military College Saint-Jean. The fort has been continually occupied since 1748, and is the core from which the city of Saint-Jean-sur-Richelieu, Quebec grew around. Fort Saint-Jean played a crucial role in the British defence strategy during the 1775 American invasion of the Province of Quebec.

== History ==
=== First fort ===
In 1663, the French King Louis XIV decided to take direct command of his New France colony, which had been previously colonized and managed by wealthy merchant associations. As the Iroquois were very often leading punitive expeditions on the New France territories and were continuously trying to steal away the French allies' hunting territories, Louis XIV decided to send the whole Carignan-Salières Regiment to build a series of forts along the Richelieu River and Lake Champlain, which explains why the area was later named the Vallée des Forts (literally: the Forts Valley), and to lead a punitive expedition against the Iroquois. The first Fort Saint-Jean was built along the Richelieu River by the Carignan-Salières Regiment in 1666 for that purpose. This first fort is believed to have been a small square-shaped fort with four bastions made of wooden palisades. It was located right after the Chambly rapids, a highly strategic position that allowed the French to monopolize a very good portage location. The French offensive into Iroquois territory was a great success and thus, a peace treaty was signed between the two parties in 1667. In 1672, after several peaceful years, the Governor of the colony decided to abandon several forts that had become useless along the Richelieu River, including Fort Saint-Jean. Because of its strategic location, Fort Saint-Jean was later to be revived, unlike other French forts such as Sainte-Thérèse and Sainte-Anne.

=== Second fort ===
The second French fort Saint-Jean was built in 1748 because of tensions between France and England arising from the War of the Austrian Succession. It was a fort of two hundred feet by two hundred feet that had four bastions, two of which were made in stone. This fort was an important relay between Montreal and Fort St. Frédéric, which was located in the south of Lake Champlain, because a road linked Fort Saint-Jean to La Prairie and allowed the communications between Montreal and St. Frédéric to be considerably shorter. The second fort Saint-Jean was given the sympathetic nickname of "Fort aux Maringouins" (Mosquitoes Fort) because of the swampy climate of the area. This fort was destroyed by French soldiers in 1760 during the French and Indian War. As there were not enough men left to defend the fort against a three to five thousand-man British army coming up from the Richelieu River to take Montreal, the French decided to abandon the fort and before they left for Montreal, they set fire to it as to not leave it to their enemy. The stone bastions of the fort that survived the fire were afterward used as a relay by the British troops.

=== 1760 British fort and the American invasion ===
Because of the dangers posed by the thirteen rebellious colonies to the south, the British in 1775 erected a third fort on the site of the previous fort. A year before the Declaration of Independence transformed the rebellious colonies into the United States of America, two small armies of rebels invaded the Province of Quebec in an attempt to defeat the British on Canadian soil and to raise Canadian opposition to royal British rule. Fort Saint-Jean played a vital role in the defence of the Province of Quebec against the Americans; indeed, it was the principal defense of Montreal against General Richard Montgomery’s army, which had planned to use the Richelieu River to reach Montreal, then march to Quebec City. The garrison of Fort Saint-Jean fought valiantly against the American troops during a forty-five-day siege before surrendering to the invaders. The siege of Fort Saint-Jean considerably weakened and slowed the American offensive: Montgomery's expedition arrived at Quebec City early in December instead of mid-October, and only three hundred of his men, out of about two thousand, actually reached Quebec City.

Because of bad weather and the weakened state of the few remaining troops, the Americans failed to take Quebec City in their assault on December 31, 1775. After British reinforcements arrived from England the next Spring, the Americans abandoned and burnt the forts, including Fort Saint-Jean, that they had taken north of Lake Champlain. But, fearing a new American invasion, the British reconstructed a strengthened Fort in 1776, adding a series of new ramparts. They also built in Saint-Jean an important shipyard to assemble the shallow-draft boats needed to follow the Americans on Lake Champlain. These boats soon would take part in the Battle of Valcour Island.

=== 19th-century fortifications ===
Fort Saint-Jean lost much of its importance after the end of the American War of Independence in 1783 and was only used as a relay during the second American Invasion in 1812–1814. However, the Patriot Revolt episodes of 1837–1838 convinced the British of the need to fortify again fort Saint-Jean and new buildings were added to the fort. Some of those buildings, built in 1839 by the Royal Engineers, are still standing and being used nowadays on the site.

At the end of the 19th and beginning of the 20th century, the fort was mostly used as a training school for several groups and regiments, The Royal Canadian Regiment (then known simply as the Infantry School Corps) and the Royal Canadian Dragoons among them. During the First World War, the Royal 22^{e} Régiment, who was back then only a battalion, was founded and trained at Fort Saint-Jean before being sent to Europe. After the war, the 22nd battalion became the first officially French-speaking Canadian regiment under the name of the Royal 22^{e} Régiment (known in English as the Vandoos). Known between the wars as Cavalry Barracks, fort Saint-Jean also served as a garrison for a Squadron and a company of The Royal Canadian Regiment.

=== Collège militaire royal de Saint-Jean (CMR) years ===
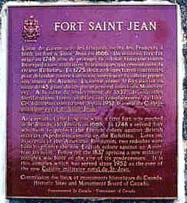
Fort Saint-Jean plaque erected by Historic Sites and Monuments Board of Canada 1928, replace 1980

In 1952, the Royal Military College Saint-Jean was created to allow a greater number of French-speaking Canadians to become officers in the Canadian Army, Royal Canadian Navy and Royal Canadian Air Force, thus becoming the first bilingual military college in Canada. Initially, only first- and second-year courses were offered and cadets had to complete the remainder of their education at the Royal Military College of Canada (RMC) in Kingston, Ontario. Over time, the college began offering third- and fourth-year courses and in 1985, it became accredited to grant its own diploma when it received its own Academic Charter.

In 1995, the CMR was closed due to budget cuts and classes were transferred to RMC Kingston. In order to maintain the CMR site and its buildings in good condition, a non-profit body was created, the Corporation du fort Saint-Jean. The "Campus du Fort Saint-Jean" then became a commercial and public site. The Corporation du Fort Saint-Jean leased some of its educational facilities to institutions such as the Université du Québec à Montréal (UQÀM) for their local programmes while also renting out other facilities for short-term events such as banquets, conventions and weddings. Moreover, the House of Commons' Language School was established in the Massey Building, where many federal Members of Parliament came to improve their French. However, the site never completely lost its military educational vocation; preparatory-year cadets and groups of officers continued to follow courses at Fort Saint-Jean.

In 2008, the military college was reopened and currently offers classes to all preparatory and first year cadets in all programs. Students past first year can study International Studies and obtain their degree from the college, as it was granted university status in 2021. However, CMR S^{t}-Jean remains a commercial site that is open to public, which is unique in Canada. There are both a museum and a multisport complex (including an ice rink and a swimming pool) located on-site.

== Fort Saint Jean Museum ==
Fort Saint Jean Museum
- Established: 1960
- Location: Collège militaire royal de Saint-Jean’s old Protestant Church on the campus of the Royal Military College Saint-Jean
- Website: http://www.museedufortsaintjean.ca/EN/index-en.htm

Fort Saint-Jean Museum was founded in 1960 as a private collection of artifacts, military objects and historical documents. With the years, the museum expanded its collection and new offers several instructive exhibitions about the site's rich military past and history. The Museum was first located in the Old Guardhouse built by the Royal Engineer between 1883 and 1889, but was relocated in 2005 to the CMR's old Protestant Church to better accommodate its exhibition and customers.

The Musée du Fort Saint Jean has collected some 2,588 pictures for an online photo album illustrative of the history of Collège militaire royal de Saint-Jean from 1952 to 1984.

== Archaeology ==
In the early 1980s, Parks Canada led archaeological digs at Fort Saint Jean and discovered on that occasion the foundations of a part of the 1748 French fort and plenty of interesting artifacts of both the French and British Regimes. In collaboration with Fort Saint Jean Museum, the Royal Military College of Saint-Jean and Université Laval, a five-year-long digging project (2009–2013) taking place in the summer at Fort Saint-Jean. Archaeology students for University Laval are doing excavations from mid-July to mid-August in order to find out more about the past of the site.

== Features and historical buildings ==
A metal National Historic Site of Canada plaque at the main gate of the college describing the history of Fort Saint-Jean reads,

As a result of the Iroquois wars a first fort was erected at S^{t}-Jean by the French in 1666. In 1748 a second fort was built to protect the French colony against British military expeditions coming up the Richelieu. Later on, as a result of the American Revolution, two redoubts were built to protect the now English colony against an American invasion. Following the 1837 uprising a new military complex was built on the site of its predecessors. It is this complex which has served since 1952 as the core of the new Collège militaire royal de Saint-Jean.

The DeLery Building, an academic classroom building, was named after Gaspard-Joseph Chaussegros de Léry, a military engineer who built Fort Saint-Jean in 1748. The Officers' Mess, the La Galissonière Pavilion, and the Montcalm Pavilion are British buildings that were built in 1839 by the Royal Engineers.

Richelieu and Iberville Squadrons use the Cartier Building, while Tracy and Jolliet Squadrons use the Champlain Building. Pavillons Vanier, DeLéry, Dextraze, LaHaie, Massey and the Old Mess are shared.

== Designated buildings ==
Name	Address	Coordinates	Government recognition (CRHP №)	Wikidata ID	Image
Fort Saint-Jean National Historic Site of Canada (1748 & 1775–1776)	Saint-Jean-sur-Richelieu, Canada; QC	45°17′53″N 73°15′07″W	Federal (13294)		
Royal Military College Saint-Jean, Gallisonnière Block / Supply Building 6 (1955)	named after Roland-Michel Barrin de La Galissonière, (commandant-general of New France); Recognized Federal Heritage Building 1987; Jacques Cartier Street, Saint-Jean-sur-Richelieu, Canada QC	45°17′54″N 73°15′06″W	Federal (10513)		
Administration Building No. 24 (1937-8)	recognized Federal Heritage Building (1989); Saint-Jean-sur-Richelieu, Canada QC	45°17′56″N 73°15′08″W	Federal (4768)		
Former Museum, Former Guard House, Building 26 (1885)	Recognized Federal Heritage Building 1989; Saint-Jean-sur-Richelieu, Canada QC	45°17′58″N 73°15′09″W	Federal (4769)		
Royal Military College Saint-Jean, Officer Cadet Dormitory (Building No. 4 and Montcalm Barracks) (1839)	named after General Louis-Joseph de Montcalm;Recognized Federal Heritage Building 1987; Jacques Cartier Street, Saint-Jean-sur-Richelieu, Canada QC	45°17′57″N 73°15′06″W	Federal (4498)		

== Books ==
- 'Les défis du fort Saint-Jean : l'invasion ratée des Américains en 1775' by Jacques Castonguay (Saint-Jean, Québec : Editions du Richelieu, c1975). ISBN 0885200039
- 'Le fort Saint-Jean: trois siècles d'histoire' by Jacques Castonguay (Montréal: Les Editions du Lévrier, 1965) Dewey: 971.4/38
- 'The Unknown fort: Saint-Jean foils Americans' by Jacques Castonguay; translated from the French by William J. Cozens (Montréal: les Editions du Lévrier, 1965).
- 'Fort Saint-Jean' by Gisèle Piédalue (Ottawa: Parks Canada, 1983) Canadiana: 840737513
