= List of Royal Military College of Canada memorials =

This is a list of Royal Military College of Canada memorials and traditions.

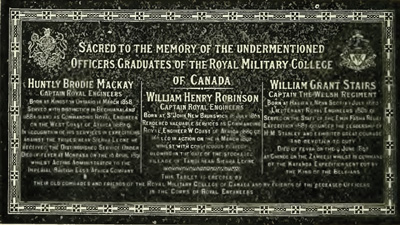
Pre-World War I memorial plaque dedicated to Royal Military College of Canada ex-cadets William Grant Stairs, Huntly Brodie Mackay, and William Henry Robinson

== Skylarks ==
Year	Skylark - annual class practical joke or prank
1933	A toy cannon made in the college mechanical engineering lab was fired down the hallway of Fort Lasalle.
1960	Declaration of martial law over the Queen's University model parliament and the taking into "protective custody" of the prime minister.
1961	Liberated Queen's University quarathon football returned via airplane to stadium.
1962	Lost rifles (minus breech blocks) "stored" in Fort Haldimand vault.
1964	Lifted a VW Beetle to Fort LaSalle landing.
1965	Toilet paper shot from cannons.
1974	A cadet's car, an MG, was left in second floor of RMC library.
1976	Cadets painted tank pink.
1979	Cadets used dental floss to ring the Spanish bell hanging in front of the Stone Frigate.
1979	Cadet climbed the Memorial Arch and painted "4 SQN" in the gravel on its surface. A squadron-mate flew over in a Cessna and took a photograph.
1984	Mackenzie Building Tower clock converted into a Mickey Mouse clock.
1993	While a cadet spent spring break in Florida, cadets took shifts to keep the hot air poppers going to fill his room in Fort Haldimand with popcorn.
2003	During grad parade practice, a piper had a fake double of himself (in full regalia) tossed from the bell tower of the MacKenzie building after the piper-solo.
2007	Cadets set off a fireworks display during morning parade.
2008	The "Brucie" statue decked out in traditional Aboriginal dress by students from the Aboriginal Leadership Opportunity Year (ALOY); "Headless horseman" appeared at a parade.; "RMC" was painted on the field of Richardson Stadium by civil engineering students and was visible for the Queen's homecoming football game, which was televised nationally.
2010	The "Brucie" statue was decked-out in Queen's University '10 coveralls featuring a Superman "Q" on the front.
2011	A Victorian era cannon was found in the middle of the Cadet Dining Room.
2012	An air cadet glider measuring 54 ft by 27 ft was found in the middle of the Cadet Dining Room (picture above).; Tables in the Cadet Dining Hall were rearranged to say "C Div".; Cadets rolled a period 25-pounder cannon into the middle of the parade square, with a 12 squadron banner taped onto it.; Spanish Bell unbolted from in front of the Stone Frigate and carried by 6 squadron for the duration of the FYOP Obstacle Course.
2013	1 Squadron Cadets converted the steps of the Currie Building into a ship, HMCS Hudson.; 8 Squadron Cadets announced that the commandant's 20+ year old car was for sale for $8.
2015	5 Squadron Cadets placed a torpedo on the parade square before morning parade.
2017	7 Squadron placed a torpedo at the main entrance of the Cadet Dining Hall, becoming a fire hazard and leading to the permanent fixture of the torpedo on its pedestal.

== Traditions ==
Tradition	Significance
blanket toss	Blanket toss of senior class members after the last waltz at the Graduation Ball.
cadet diary	Some cadets wrote their diary on their t-square in India ink, while others wrote on their books. The museum retains examples of diaries from the 1890s to the present day.
cake walk	Minstrel show/stage show on St. Patrick's Day is rewarded by a cake.
Casey's Grave	Cadets are expected to recite, on demand from seniors, RMC facts and trivia (no longer practiced, nor required). This inscription is a favourite: "Casey, for 18 years my faithful charger in peace and war. Died on duty April 2nd 1925 age 29 yrs. A.C. Macdonell".
ceremonial mace	Carried into the ceremony and placed on stage to signal the opening of the convocation.
change of command ceremony	The former commandant offers farewell and best wishes to the college and to the new Commandant. The new commandant accepts a first salute as the cadet wing marches past.
Christening bell	Following naval tradition, a ship's bell is used as a baptism font in the college chapel for christenings and the names of the children are later inscribed on the bell. The ship's bell at RMC was used previously at Royal Roads Military College.
Church parade	Officer cadets participate in a full regalia parade from RMC to Kingston City Hall on the last Sunday of the academic year. The intent is to have every available cadet take part. In the past, the church parade was from RMC to St. George's Cathedral (Kingston, Ontario).
Copper Sunday	In a tradition dating to 1882, Officer cadets attend various Kingston churches on the last Sunday of the academic year. While RMC does not to influence cadets toward any particular religion, the goal is to expose the cadets to the typical processes and procedures of religious ceremony, should they need to carry out Assisting Officer duties in the future. The name comes from the custom of cadets gathering their pennies for collection into the offering plate.
College Cheer	The RMC Cheer is used at all significant sporting events between RMC Paladins and other university teams. Call: Gimme a beer! Response: Beer! Esses! Emma! T-D-V! Who can stop old RMC! Shrapnel, cordite, NCT! R-M-C!
College Coin	Every new officer cadet is issued a challenge coin upon completion of First Year Orientation Period. The coin is engraved with the name of the college in French and English surrounding the college crest on the obverse. The Cadet's college number and the Memorial Arch are on the reverse surrounded by the motto in both languages.
college toast	RMC club toast to absent comrades, meaning those who have fallen in action or who have died.
Divisional Christmas mess dinner	The youngest cadet of the division makes a short speech, requesting one holiday wish from the DCdts for the rest of the division; the wishes from the division dinners will make the exam period less stressful for the Cadet Wing (e.g. permission to wear combat uniforms while writing their exams).
Drill Fest	During the weeks immediately following winter-term exams up until graduation, the wing practices for graduation parade multiple times a day seven days a week, often for up to six hours in blocks of three hours.
Feux de Joie	An honour guard perform a rifle salute with field artillery, or more commonly, rifles using blank ammunition.
Freedom of the City	This privilege was bestowed to the RMC in 1976 by City of Kingston on the occasion of its centenary to march through the city "with bayonets fixed, colours flying and drums beating" was granted "until such time as the Cataraqui runs dry."
Freedom of the fort	While in Fort Frederick (Kingston, Ontario), officer cadets are equal independently of their year. They are also allowed to remove their headgear.
"Goodnight Saigon"	This song is played for and sung by first-year cadets at lights-out during the First-Year Orientation Period.
Graduation Congratulations	Peter Mackay, RMC Chancellor and Defence Minister, started a new tradition at RMC in 2008 when he asked graduates to stand and congratulate those near them.
Graduation and Commissioning parade	In honour of graduating cadets: Graduating students are presented with their Officer's Commissions in the Canadian Forces.; Officer Cadets display their foot drill and sword movements.; Feux de Joie an honour guard performs a rifle salute with field artillery.; Graduates march through Memorial Arch for the last time as Officer Cadets.
Jacket exchange	The senior officer (the Commandant or the Director of Cadets) exchanges tunics with the youngest Officer Cadet at the annual RMC Christmas Dinner. The Christmas dinner follows the tradition from the army where senior officers serve the junior members who usually serve them throughout the year.
Just passing By	When a graduate of the RMC pilots an aircraft in the vicinity of Kingston, Ontario he or she conducts an impromptu airshow over the College.
Memorial Arch	New officer-cadets pass through the Commemorative Arch as a class on their first day of university and upon graduation. Other than on Remembrance Day and in the course of other special parades (i.e. Battle of Britain), church parade, officer-cadets do not pass under the arch as a class before their graduation from college.
Memorial Arch architectural sculpture	A helmeted head stands in high-relief from the keystone. The face is extremely expressive and its parted lips seem to shout Rupert Brooke's poem, "The Dead".
Memorial Arch poem	Chiselled into the stone of the Memorial Arch are the opening lines of Rupert Brooke's poem, The Dead: "Blow out, you bugles, over the rich Dead. There are none of these so lonely and poor of old, but dying has made us rarer gifts than gold." First-year cadets are required to memorize the quote.
Memorial stairway	Sir Archibald Macdonell had the administration-building staircase lined with paintings of ex-cadets who died on military service.
Memorial trees	The ex-cadets who died on military service during World War I are honoured by the birch trees located in the lawn at the west end of the Administration Building.
obstacle course race	Gruelling course for recruits set up by the cadets' immediate predecessors, memorialized by a sculpture
Old 18	First-year cadets are required to memorize the names of the first class in the order of their college numbers.
Old 18	A historical drill team at RMC who perform at the "Sunset Ceremony" (a military tattoo the night before the graduation parade). Eighteen cadets, dressed in formal scarlet uniforms and wielding late 19th-century Enfield rifles fend off an attack by cadets dressed as rebels using similar rifles of smaller caliber.
Old Guard	The founding members of the QCMG. Established by a select group of cadets sometime around 1989, the QCMG existed within the cadet population. Upon graduation, departing QCMG cadets would be responsible for selecting a suitably deserving first year cadet to take their place in guard, ensuring its survivability. However, only the founding members were ever referred to as the "Old Guard".
Old Brigade	Alumni who entered military college 50+ years before wear unique berets and ties, have the Right of the Line on reunion weekend memorial parades, and present the college cap badge to the First Year cadets on the First Year Badging Parade. Each class traditionally marks its 50-year anniversary and entry into the Old Brigade with a gift.
Parade square	Recruits run the square at all times until they have successfully completed their first year. (no longer practiced, nor required)
Road and area names	Sir Archibald Macdonell gave Great War names to all the roads and areas of RMC.
Royal winers	Unofficial Department of Oenology at RMC cofounded by Dr. Lubomyr Luciuk; motto: "Age leaves us fine wines and friends."
shouldering professors	At closing exercises, cadets carried professors around the room.
Sir John A Macdonald	An annual dinner held at RMC Senior Staff Mess, since 2001 featuring toasts and stories celebrating the birth of Canada's first Prime Minister.
Smokers	Social gatherings at RMC that raise money for an event, group, or charity through the collection of "cover" or admission at the door. Smokers can include performances, with shows presenting a collection of sketches and comedy songs.
Snowball fight	Annual RMC snowball fight (all Sqns against #1 Sqn).
Snow sculpture	Annual RMC snow sculpture competition in Confederation Park with Queen's. RMC's entry was modelled after the MacKenzie Building (2008) and the Memorial Arch (2007).
Spider	A spider web based stained glass window, made by Stone Frigate Class of 1983 honours the squadron mascots, as spiders were common in the (pre-modernized) building. The window has a Plexiglas shield to avoid damage during annual snowball fight.
Sunset ceremony	A military tattoo held the night before the graduation parade which demonstrates skills and interests cultivated at RMC. The 2013 performances: the RMC Precision Drill Team performed a silent precision drill routine including the throwing of rifles, rifle salutes and sword drill movements.; the Old Eighteen Historic Drill Team demonstrated the military dress, drill and tactics of the period when the Old Eighteen originally enrolled in the first class of Royal Military College, 1876, under the training hands of Sergeant-Major Mortimer and Captain Ridout.; the Naval Gun Crew provided artillery support; the Sandhurst Military Skills Team, tae kwon do, cheerleading, and fencing teams, the outgoing and incoming Colour Parties, accompanied by the Guard of Honour carrying the provincial flags on parade, performed the exchanging the colours. The Colour Party consists of a party commander, two flag bearers carrying the RMC stand of colours and two rifle escorts.; Canadian Forces parachute demonstration team, the SkyHawks from Trenton, Ontario.; Aboriginal Leadership Opportunity Year (or ALOY) program students performed the Bear Song, the Sobriety Song and the Migma Honour Song on a large ceremonial drum with vocal accompaniment; The Sandhurst Military Skills team rappelled from LaSalle dormitory and performed simulations and obstacle course.; The Tae Kwon Do team showed discipline and fortitude in their display of the martial art.; RMC's Pipes and Drums, Brass Band, and Highland Dancers, perform Star Wars, Highland Laddie, The Retreat, The Tattoo, O Canada and Amazing Grace; During the Sunset Ceremony, the Commandant's Pennant, RMC School Flag, Canadian Forces Flag and Canadian National Flag are lowered; Fireworks concluded the tattoo
Sweetheart brooch	officer cadets gave their dates an enamel brooch in lieu of a corsage for formal dances at Christmas, RMC-West Point, and Graduation. The museum retains several examples.
Wake up or Panic song	officer cadets have the duration of a song to get up, shave, make their beds, dress and stand for inspection. Tango Flight (7 Sqn)'s song in 1993 was "Happiness in Slavery", by Nine Inch Nails. Cartier Flight's wake up song was "Dead on Time" and they went to sleep to Corey Hart's "Never Surrender". Other popular songs include "O Fortuna" and "The Bodies Hit The Floor".
War Memorial flag	Flag with Union Flag on background was adorned with 1100 green maple leaves bearing name of RMC cadets who served in war. The red maple leaves in the centre memorialized cadets who were killed in action. The flag hung in St. George's Cathedral until 1934, when the flag began to disintegrate.

== Class gifts ==
Class	Endowment
1955	RMC Museum
1956	1956 Leadership Library Collection
1957	RMC TV Station
1958	Lecture series on emerging 21st-century global issues
1959	RMC Library
1960	College/Principal choice
1961	Birchall Pavilion and maple trees
1962	RMC Library
1963	RMC Wall of Honour commemorating outstanding alumni
1964	RMC Library
1965	RMC Professorship
1966	Gazebo/Leonard Birchall Pavilion

== RMC Militaria collectibles ==
- Royal Military College of Canada Officer Cadet action figure, made for 2006 Great Canadian Action Figure Convention in Kingston, Ont. The male model figure can wear a 1st year scarlet dress uniform jacket with academic achievement badges or a 4th year senior cadet's #4s patrol jacket with academic and sports badges, plus belt with a dress navy trousers with red piping. In addition, the figure wears leather ankle boots with Vibrom soles, leather gaiters, leather belt with metal RMC buckle, and a leather bayonet frog. The arms include a metal C7 rifle and metal bayonet with metal scabbard. The box features RMC landmarks and a description of the College in English and French.
- Royal Military College of Canada Officer Cadet 54mm pewter Toy Soldiers include: Cadet Squadron Leader with sword and four first year cadets with FNC1 rifle. The female and male cadets are dressed in Scarlet Ceremonial uniforms with white belts, pillbox hats, dark trousers with red piping, gaiters and black boots.
- Royal Military College of Canada officer cadet 'Gentlemen Cadet' 80 mm metal figure No. 53 c. 1980 by Chas C. Stadden Studios.

=== Currie Hall ===
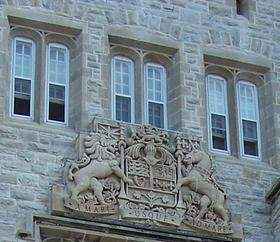
Coat of arms of Canada on Currie Hall Mackenzie Building Royal Military College of Canada

General Sir Arthur Currie officially opened Currie Hall at Royal Military College on 17 May 1922. General Sir Arthur Currie made the following comments, "I cannot tell you how utterly embarrassed and yet how inexpressibly proud I am to witness this ceremony, and to be present when this hall is officially opened. This hall is to commemorate the deeds of our fellow comrades whom it was my great honour and privilege to command during the latter years of the War." The Currie Hall is decorated with the crests and battle colours of every unit that fought in France during World War I.

His Excellency John Ralston Saul (February 2004) described the Currie Hall decorations, "This is an astonishing hall in which to speak. If you gaze up at the initials on the ceiling and at the paintings and the painted insignia around the walls, you are reminded that Canada is not a new country."... "Militarily speaking, we have been at it for a long time. This hall is a conceptualisation of our participation in the First World War. All of that grandeur and tragedy is pulled together here in a remarkable way. I'm not sure that we could reproduce a hall of this sort to describe our military experiences of the last half century."

=== Memorial arch ===
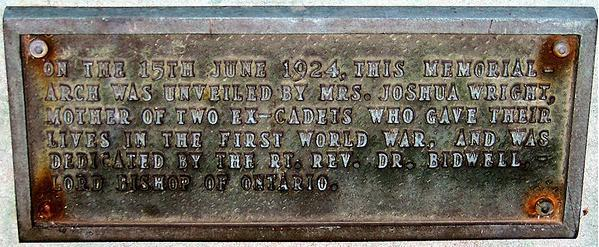
Memorial Arch plaque unveiling Royal Military College of Canada

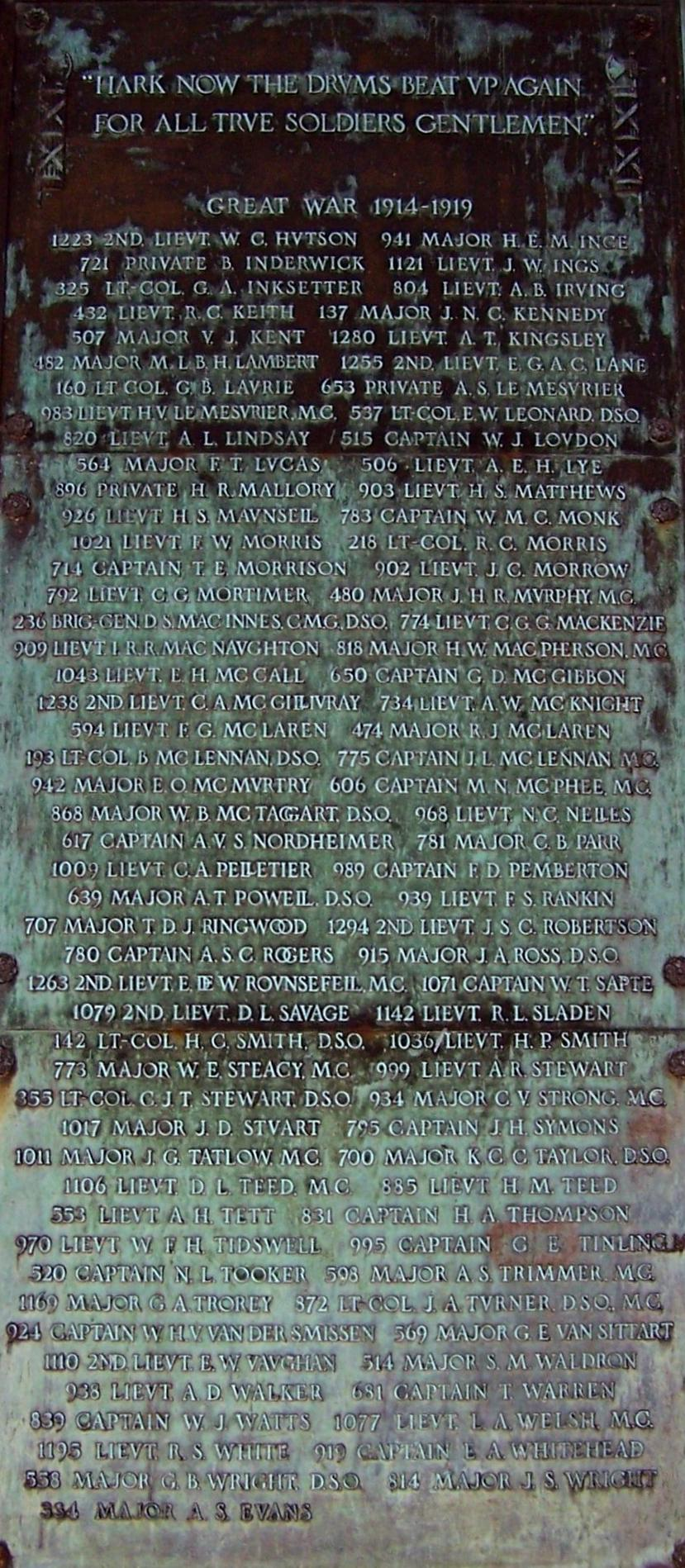
Royal Military College of Canada plaque great war 1914-1919

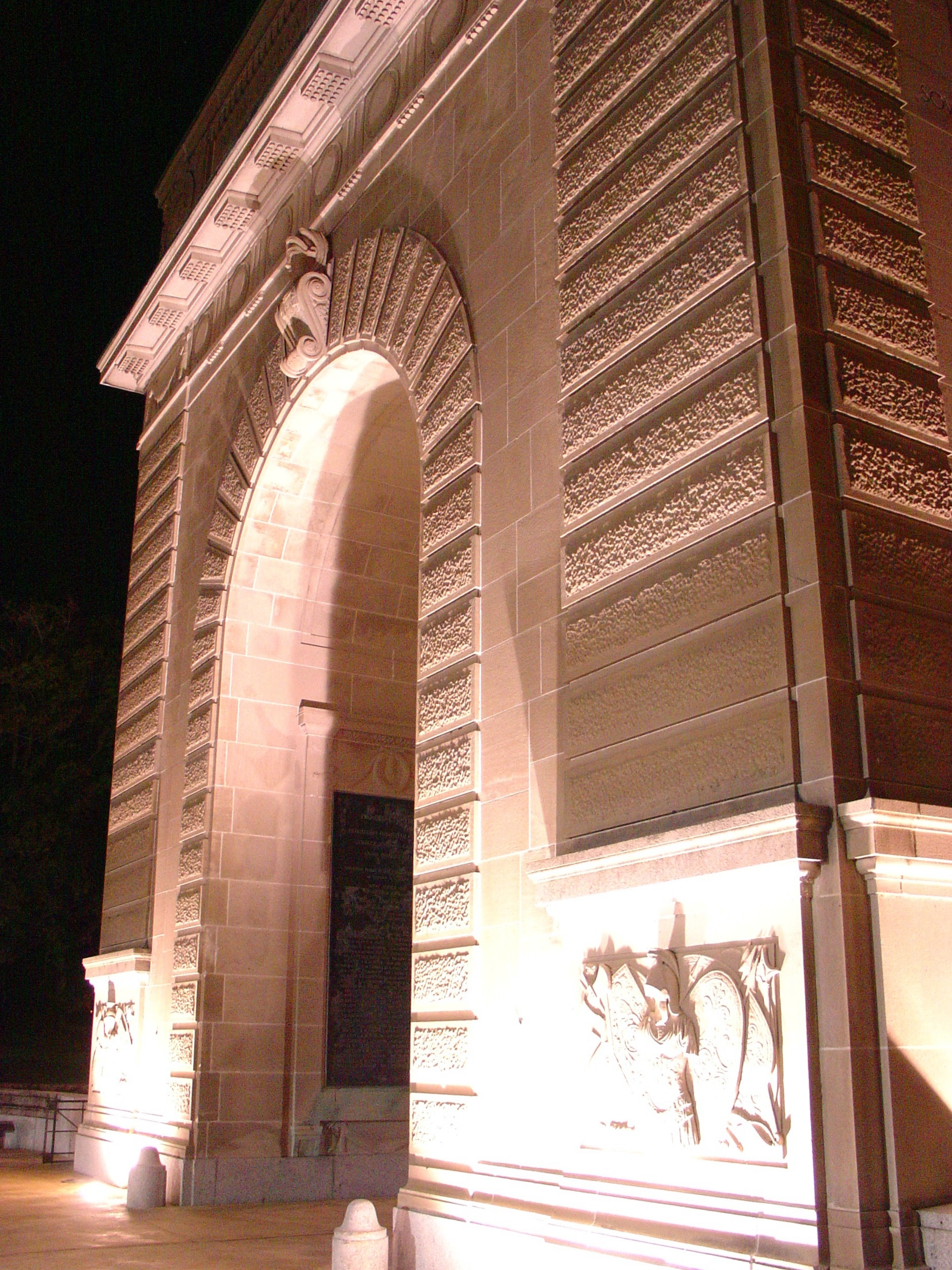
Memorial Arch

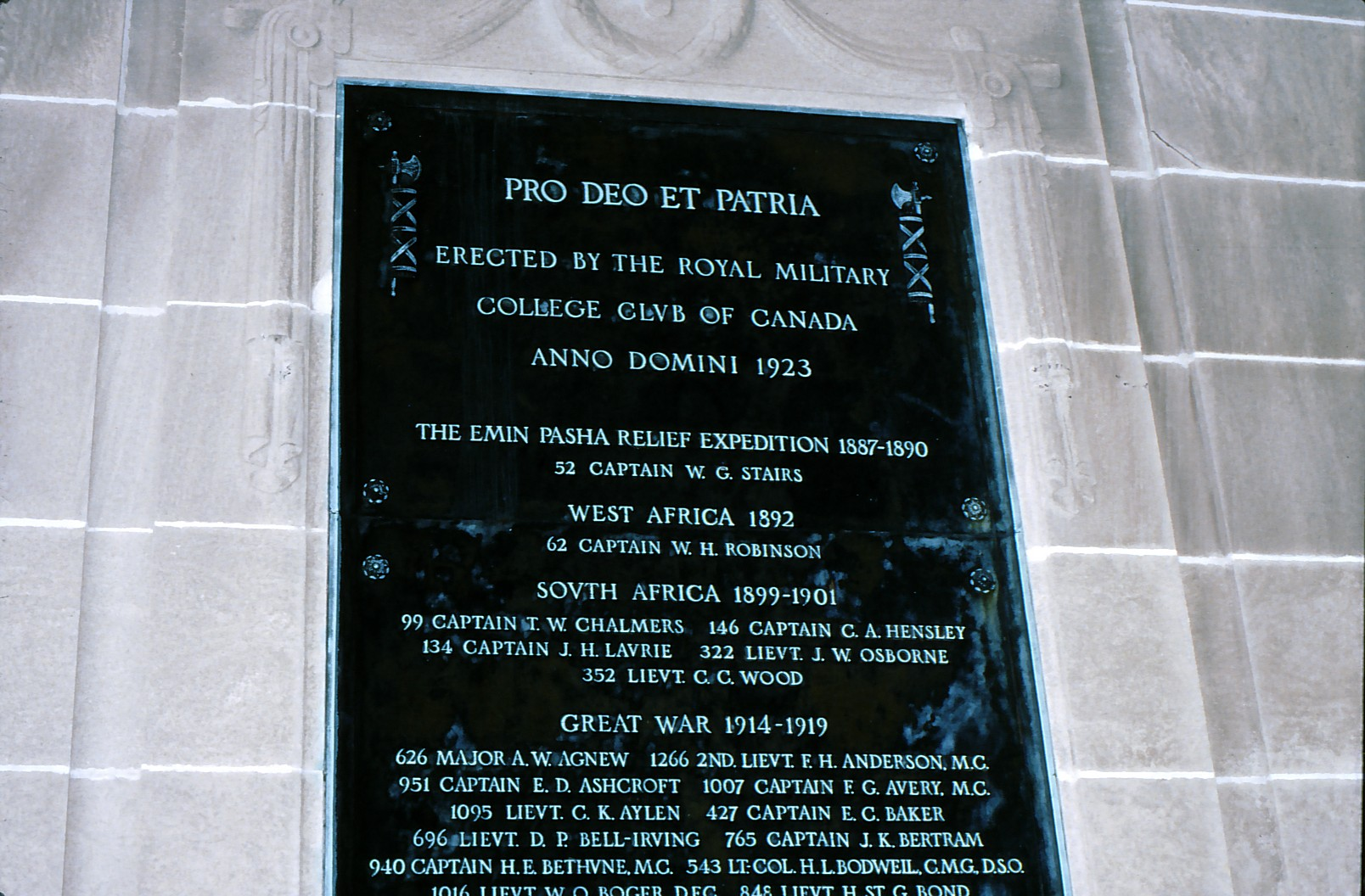
Memorial Arch List of Cadets who were killed in action

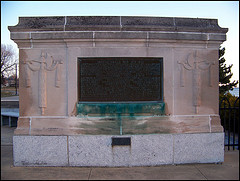
Memorial plaque dedicated to Royal Military College of Canada ex-cadets post World War II

The Memorial Arch, at the Royal Military College of Canada in Kingston, Ontario, built in 1923, is a monument which honours the memory of ex-cadets who have died in combat or while attending the College. The Memorial Arch, designed by John M. Lyle, is an example of the Beaux-Arts architecture. Lyle's design won a competition in which seven Canadian architects were invited to compete. Leigh French singles out the Memorial Arch as "an outstanding example of coherent purpose and well considered form, unlike many of the war memorial projects that emerged immediately after World War I". The Indiana limestone arch on a base of Quebec granite was built at a cost of $75,000.

The arch was unveiled by Mrs. Joshua Wright, mother of two cadets who gave their lives in the First World War. #558 Major G.B. Wright, DSO, RCE, was killed in action in France on 21 May 1915. #814 Major J.S. Wright, 50th Bn CEF, was killed in action in France on 18 Nov 1916.

The memorial includes the following texts:

- Hark now the drums beat up again for all true Soldiers Gentlemen. from Over the Hills and Far Away (traditional)
- Je me souviens French I remember
- Truth Duty Valour
- Blow out your bugles over the rich dead. There's none of these so lonely and poor of old but dying has made us rarer gifts than gold. by Rupert Brooke
- Pro Deo et Patrio, Latin for God and Country

The RMC Memorial Arch provides a list of officer cadets who were killed in action or died from wounds suffered in action under the following headings:

- The Emin Pasha Relief Expedition 1887–90,
- West Africa 1892,
- South Africa 1899–1901,
- Great War 1914-1918 battles: Mons, Marne, Aisne, Ypres, Festubert, Loos, Somme, Vimy, Kut el Amara, Gallipoli, Hill 70, Passchendaele, Cambrai, Amiens, Arras, Drocourt-Quéant, Canal du Nord.
- World War II battles: Battle of the Atlantic, Battle of Britain, Burma, Dieppe, Hong Kong, Lombardy Plain, Normandy.
- Active service 1926-1945: India, 1926, North Africa, North West Germany, The Pacific, Pas de Calais, The Rhine, Sicily, Southern Italy.

Two bronze plaques on the flanking plinths of the Arch, which were unveiled by the Governor General on 15 September 1949, commemorates the fallen from World War II. As required, names of those lost in Korea and on peacekeeping and other military operations have been added.

== Historical pieces of artillery ==
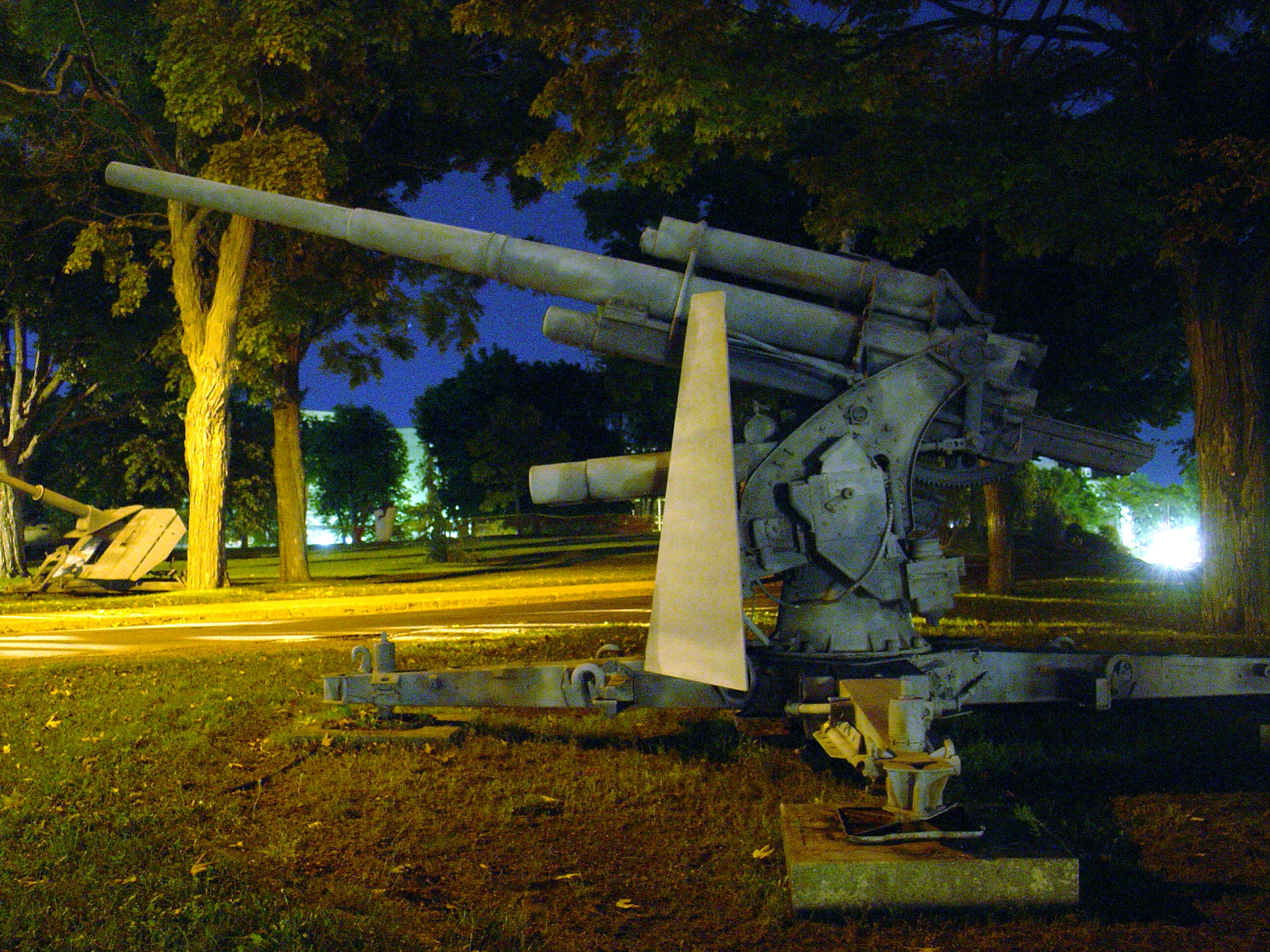
88mm gun monument at the Royal Military College of Canada.

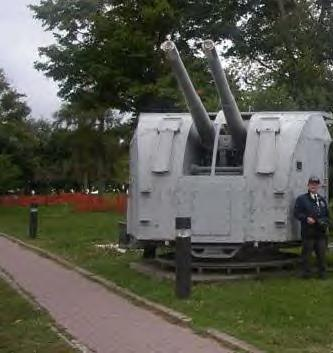
HMCS Huron (G24) X Guns, Royal Military College of Canada

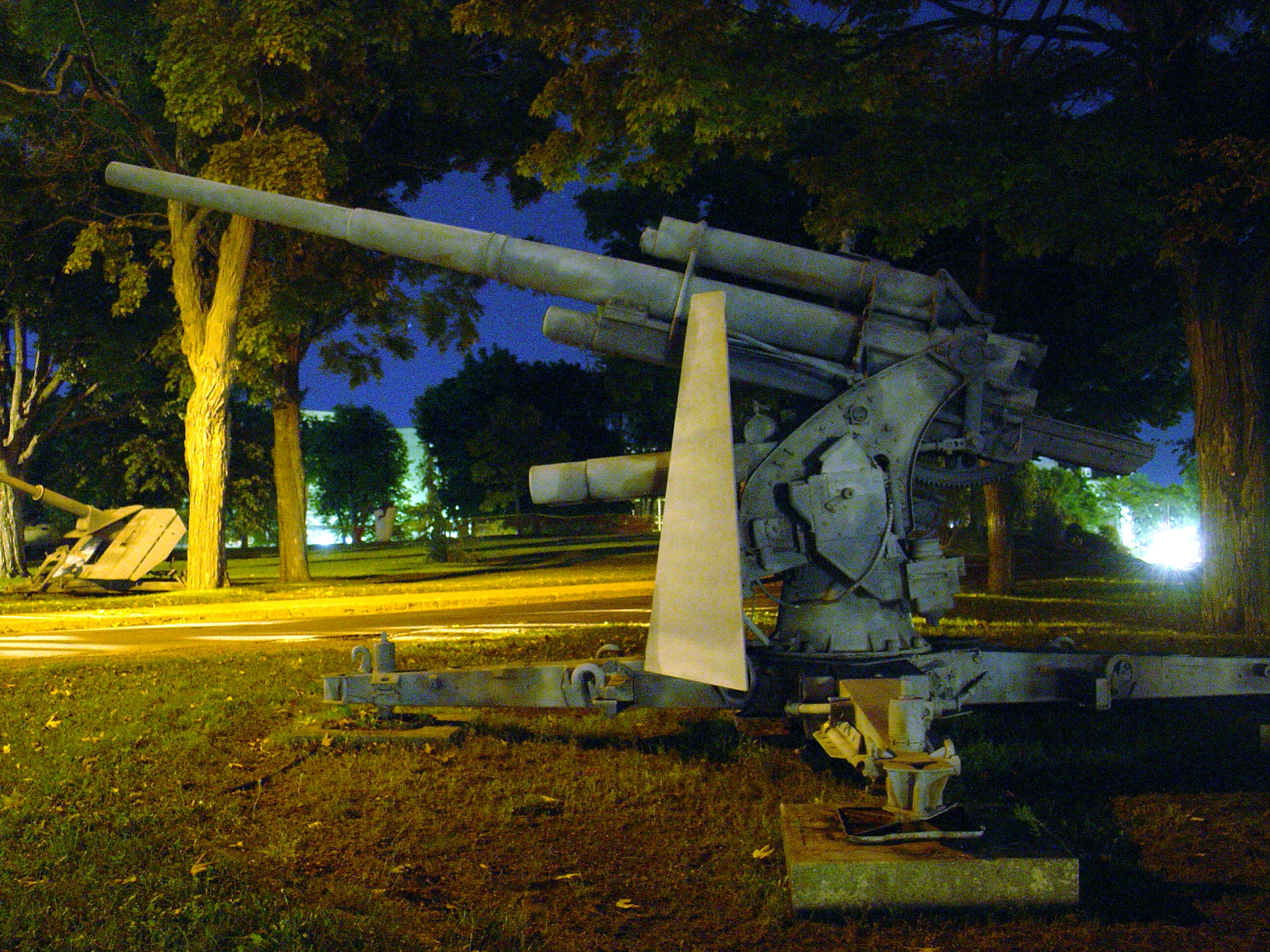
88mm gun monument at the Royal Military College of Canada.

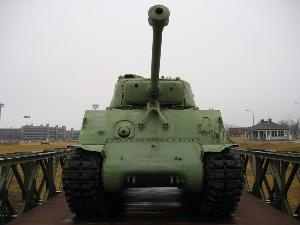
Bailey bridge at Royal Military College of Canada constructed in 2004 to commemorate the 100th anniversary of the Engineering Branch

Artillery or ordinance	Description	Location
Blomefield SBML 32-pounder Gun,	weight 57-0-2, (6,386 lbs), Carron, 1806, King George III cypher	Fort Frederick Tower 3 North
Blomefield SBML 32-pounder gun	weight 56-3-0, (6,084 lbs), Carron, 1807, King George III cypher	Fort Frederick Tower 3 East
Blomefield SBML 32-pounder gun	weight 56-0-25, (6,025 lbs), Carron, 1811, King George III cypher	Fort Frederick Tower 3 West
Blomefield SBML 32-pounder gun,	Walker Co, King George III cypher	Parade Square North East
Millar SBML 32-pounder gun	weight 64-2-10 (7,234 lbs), Walker Co, 1842, King George III cypher	Fort Frederick 2
Blomefield SBML 32-pounder gun	weight 67-0-9 (7,513 lbs), Carron, 1807, King George III cypher	Fort Frederick 3
Blomefield SBML 32-pounder gun	weight 53-0-25 (5,961 lbs), Walker Co, King George III cypher	Fort Frederick 5
Blomefield SBML 32-pounder gun	weight 64-3-0 (7,252 lbs), Walker Co, 1842	Fort Frederick 6
Blomefield Palliser conversion of a SBML to RML 32-pounder gun	RGF, 1870, Queen Victoria cypher	Paint Yard
Blomefield Palliser conversion of a SBML to RML 32-pounder gun	Queen Victoria cypher	Paint Yard
Blomefield SBML 32-pounder gun	Walker Co, King George III cypher	Crerar Gateway West
Blomefield SBML 32-pounder gun	weight 50-1-14 (5,670 lbs), Walker Co, King George III cypher	Crerar Gateway East
Blomefield SBML 32-pounder gun	Carron, 1807, King George III cypher	Fort Haldiman
Blomefield SBML 32-pounder gun	King George III cypher	MacDonald West
Blomefield SBML 32-pounder gun	Walker Co, King George III cypher	MacDonald East
SBML 24-pounder gun	weight 20-0-4 (2,244 lbs, weight of a 6-pounder), 1847, Queen Victoria cypher	Fort Frederick North East 1, mounted on long wooden carriage
SBML 24-pounder gun	weight 20-0-0 (2,240 lbs, weight of a 6-pounder), 1847, Queen Victoria cypher	Fort Frederick 7, mounted on long wooden carriage
SBML 24-pounder brass gun	weight 12-3-7 (1,435 lbs), 1843, CLXXV (175), Queen Victoria cypher, DEMD	Senior Staff Mess North
SBML 9-pounder brass gun	weight 13-2-0 (1,512 lbs), FM Eardly-Wilmot, 1859, Queen Victoria cypher, 4862	Senior Staff Mess South
SBML 9-pounder brass gun	1813, Dolphin handles, DLVIII (558), King George III cypher	flagpole East
SBML 9-pounder brass gun	1812, Dolphin handles, CCCLIV (354), King George III cypher	flagpole West
SBML 32-pounder gun	Carron, weight 17-3-7 (1,995 lbs)	Fort Frederick Tower 2 North West
SBML 32-pounder gun	Carron, 1808	Fort Frederick Tower 2 North
SBML 32-pounder gun	Carron, 1804	Fort Frederick Tower 2 North East
SBML 32-pounder gun	Carron, weight 17-3-7 (1,995 lbs)	Fort Frederick Tower, Main South
SBML 32-pounder gun	Carron, weight 17-3-11 (1,999 lbs)	Fort Frederick Tower, Main North
SBML 32-pounder gun	Carron, weight 17-1-21 (1,953 lbs)	Fort Frederick Tower, Main North East
SBML 10-inch 52-cwt mortar	weight 18-x-x (>2,000 lbs), Walker Co, 1856, shot in the muzzle	Stone Frigate North
SBML 10-inch 52-cwt mortar	weight 18-1-9 (2,053 lbs), shot in the muzzle	Stone Frigate South
Armstrong RBL 7-inch 72 cwt gun	weight 81-3-3 (9,159 lbs), 1862, Queen Victoria cypher	mounted on a long wooden carriage, Fort Frederick 4
Blomefield SBML 12-pounder gun	4.75-inch2 foot long gun fragment	Fort Frederick Tower B
Blomefield SBML 12-pounder gun	4.75-inch, 2 feet 5 inches long, embedded in the road at a 30-degree angle	Main Gate North
Blomefield SBML gun, 4.75-inch	2 feet 5 inches long, embedded in the road at a 30-degree angle	Main Gate South
German Second World War 8.8-cm	7.5 cm Infanteriegeschütz 37 FlaK 37 Anti-Aircraft Gun, (Serial Nr. R5456) 1042 CXX (120)	Crerar Crescent
German Second World War 8.8-cm Panzerabwehrkanone 43	(8.8-cm PaK 43) anti-tank gun, Breeching Ring (Serial Nr. R1243)	Crerar Crescent
Ordnance QF 25-pounder gun	Reg No. 16055	Massey Library, by the Cadet statue
M109 155-mm self-propelled howitzer	(Reg. No. 77225), 1985, AC: AX, ECC: 119205 HUI C: 1941, SAUI C: 1941, VMO No. DLE29685, VMO Date: 09 Dec 2002	Training Aid, RMC

== Memorials ==
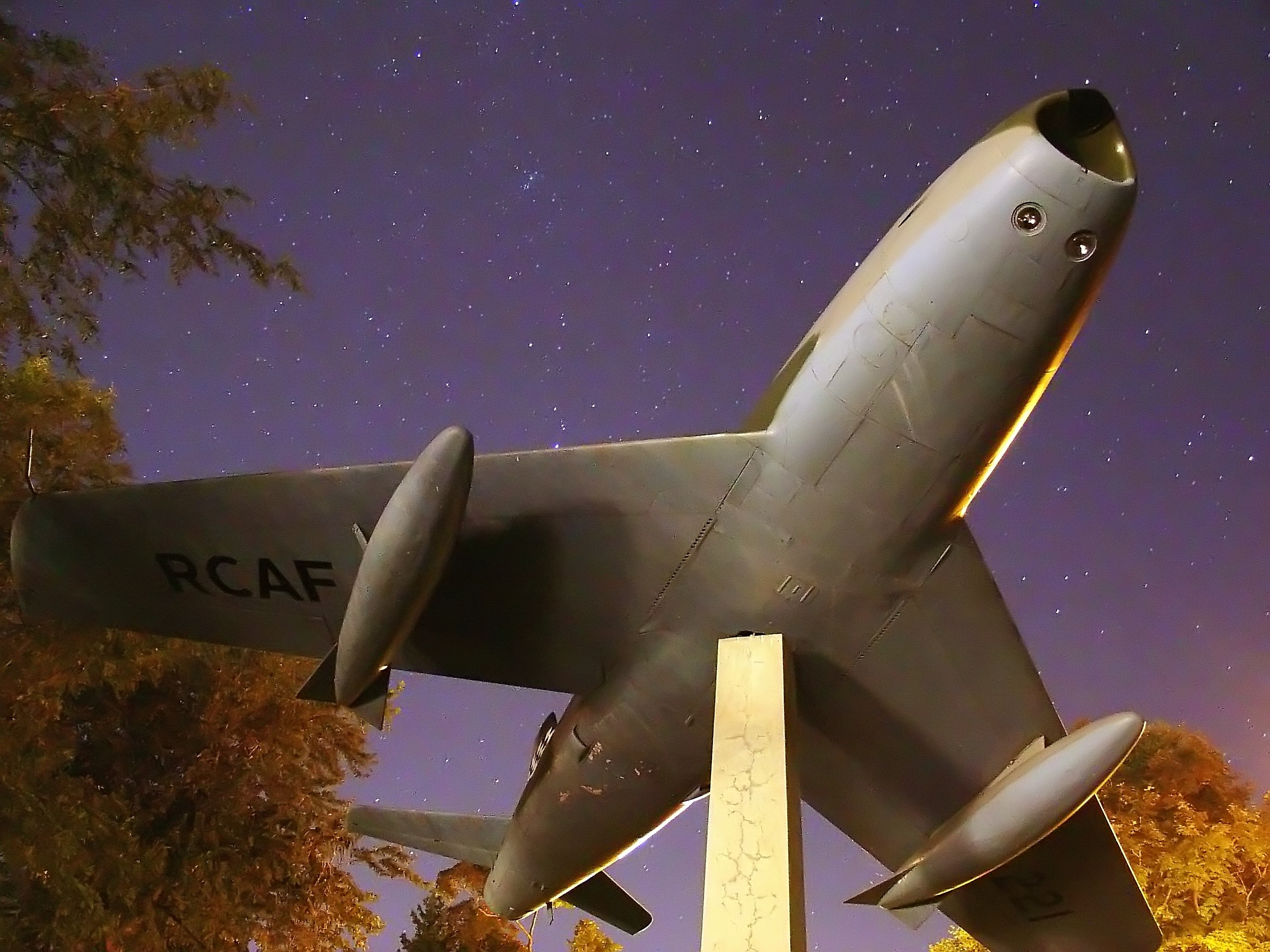
F-86 Sabre monument at the Royal Military College of Canada

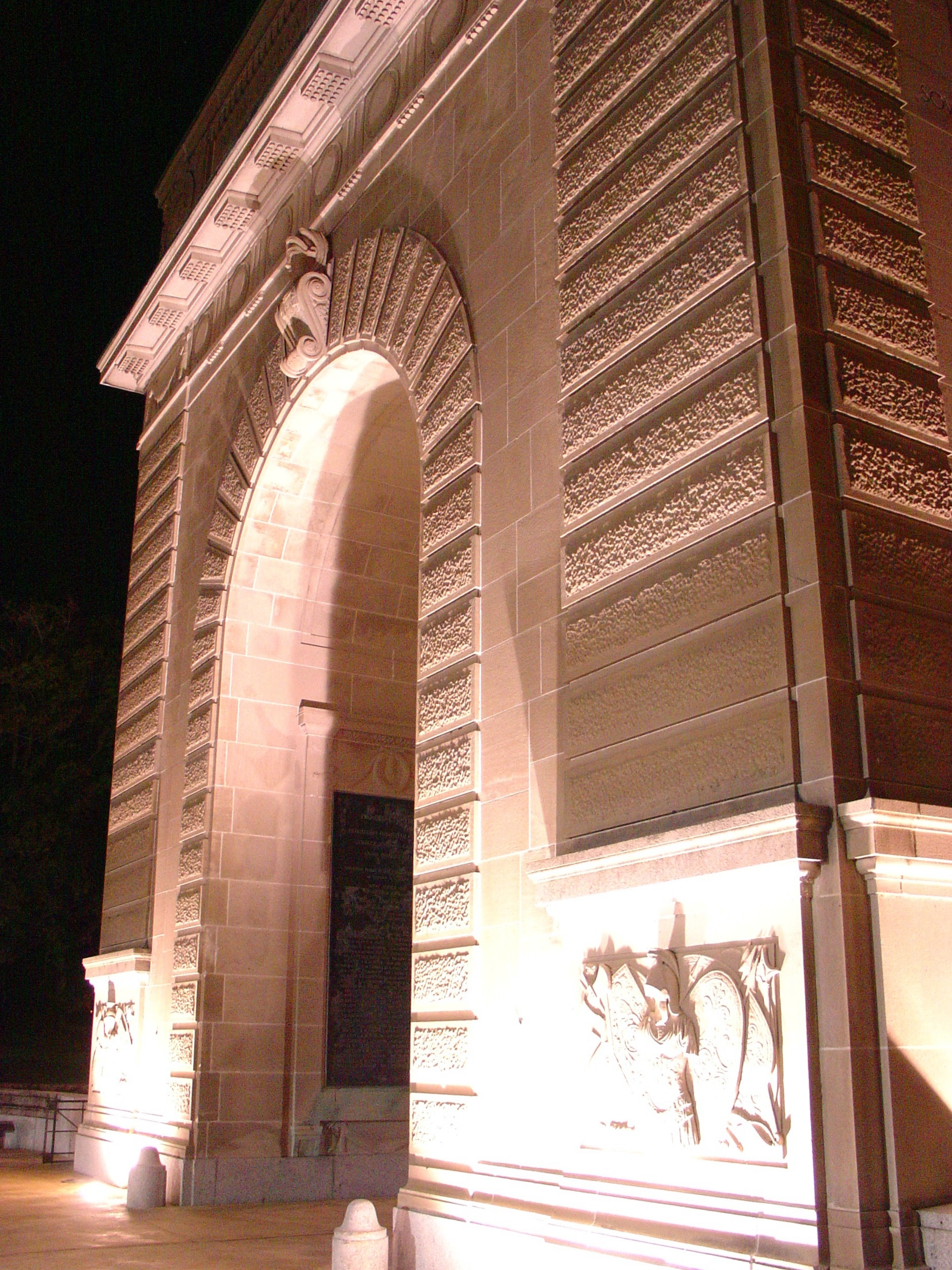
Commemorative Arch

Other	Description	Location
The 4 in (100 mm) QF 4-inch/45 Mk XVI Twin Naval Guns mounted in Mk XVI turret taken off HMCS Huron	SIL1944, Breech S 13769, HMCS Huron, Barrel No. 1 (Serial No. 14492), 1944, and Barrel No. 2 (Serial No. 13760), 1944. Refurbished with the financial support of the ex cadet club 2010	Crerar Crescent
Carriage Lamps	donated by Class of 1985	on Crerar Gates
Aircraft Avro CF-100 Canuck Mark 5	In the colours of 414 (electronic Warfare) squadron (Serial No. 18731), (Serial No. 100731), silver, presented by the RMCC class of 1972 refurbished with the financial support of the ex cadet club and rededicated on October 6, 1996.	at RMCC near the 'Canadian Army Command and Staff College' (CACSC)
Aircraft Canadair CL-13 F-86 Sabre Mk. 5	(Serial No. 23221), camouflage, presented by Class of 1968, refurbished by RMC Club 1996.	mounted on a pylon, formerly at Royal Roads Military College (RRMC), now at RMCC
Sherman Tank Model M4A2E8 Sherman Medium Tank	76-mm Gun, (Serial No. 65021), "Athene", presented by Class of 1971 & refurbished with the financial support of the ex cadet club 2010	mounted on a Bailey Bridge, Royal Military College, Kingston, Ontario
Centurion Tank Main Battle Tank Mark 5	20-pounder main gun, CFR No. 52-81053, from Class of 1979. refurbished with the financial support of the ex cadet club 2010	Royal Military College, Kingston, Ontario
Leopard tank		Royal Military College, Kingston, Ontario
Gazebo	from Class of 1966	behind Fort Champlain
Information Kiosk - history of RMC and Memorial Arch	Erected as part of Memorial Arch refurbishment project.	Beside the Memorial Arch
Sidewalk - "Route 66"	from Class of 1966	runs via Potters Lodge to Massey Building
3 stained glass windows in Mackenzie Building represent Navy, Army and Air Force designed by Robert Jekyll	from the Class of 1956	in Mackenzie Building
oil painting by William Irving shows representative figures from all of the Corps and regiments of the British army in which ex-cadets of RMC of Canada served.	the British Army presented RMC with the painting in 1976 on the occasion of the College's Centennial.	in "Heritage Room" in Mackenzie Building

== Commemorative and memorial stained glass windows ==
Location	Date	Description	Manufacturer	Inscription	Window
Sir Arthur Currie Hall	1973	1 light Oak tree and crest	Robert McCausland Limited	honours Class of 1958	
Sir Arthur Currie Hall	1970	1 light Royal Canadian Dragoons	Robert McCausland Limited	honours 2770 LCol KL Jefferson	
Sir Arthur Currie Hall	1967	1 light Antique window navy league	Robert McCausland Limited	* In memory of David H. Gibson, C.B.E. National President, Navy League of Canada, 1938-1952	
Sir Arthur Currie Hall	1968	1 light Royal Canadian Horse Artillery Crest	Robert McCausland Limited	* In memory of Colonel Edward Geoffrey Brooks DSO OBE CD 1918-1964 staff adjutant 1948-1950 by classes of 1948-52	
Sir Arthur Currie Hall	1968	1 light Dieppe Dawn	Robert McCausland Limited	* In memory of Dieppe Dawn 19 August 1942 by classes of 1948-52	
Sir Arthur Currie Hall	1967	1 light Coronation flag and crest	Robert McCausland Limited		
Sir Arthur Currie Hall	1973	1 light Royal Canadian Engineers Crest	Robert McCausland Limited		
Sir Arthur Currie Hall	1966	1 light Royal Horse Guards and family crest	Robert McCausland Limited		
Sir Arthur Currie Hall	1967	1 light Antique window	Robert McCausland Limited	* Navy League Cadet Corps (Canada) Navy League Wrennette Corp Navy League Cadet Corps (Canada) Royal Canadian Sea Cadets	Navy League Cadet Corps (Canada), Memorial Stained Glass Window, Currie Hall, Currie Building, Royal Military College of Canada
Roman Catholic Chapel	1938	1 light Emblem Lamb of God carrying a flag	Robert McCausland Limited	To the memory of the class entering in 1938 who gave their lives for Canada.	
Roman Catholic Chapel	1963	1 light Emblem lilies and M	Robert McCausland Limited	Dedicated to the memory of our beloved son S/L Ian G.A. Mcnaughton, R.C.A.F., RMC 2588. Born 6 Nov. 1919. Killed in Action over Germany, 23 June 1942. R.I.P.	
Roman Catholic Chapel	1963	1 light Crest	Robert McCausland Limited	Donated by the Kingston branch of the Royal Military College Club of Canada, May 1963.	
Roman Catholic Chapel	1963	1 light Alpha Omega Bible and Torch		Donated by Mrs. Oliver Tiffany (Kit) Macklem in memory of her husband no. 605 Oliver Tiffany, and her father no. 203 William Bermingham	
Roman Catholic Chapel		1 light Dove		Offert par Marguerite et Edouard de B. Panet.	
Roman Catholic Chapel		1 light Chalice and wheat		Presented by H6888 Lt.-Colonel Thomas Fraser Gelley, M.A., Ll.D member of faculty, 1919-1963.	
Roman Catholic Chapel	1963	1 light Alpha Omega Bible and Torch		Donated by Mrs. Oliver Tiffany (Kit) Macklem in memory of her husband no. 605 Oliver Tiffany, and her father no. 203 William Bermingham	
Protestant Chapel	1963	1 light Royal Military College Crest	Robert McCausland Limited	Donated by the Kingston branch of the Royal Military College Club of Canada, May 1963.	
Protestant Chapel	1963	1 light Royal Military College Crest	Robert McCausland Limited	Donated by the Kingston branch of the Royal Military College Club of Canada, May 1963.	
Protestant Chapel	1963	1 light Timothy	Robert McCausland Limited	"put on the whole armour of god." In loving memory of no. 2609 Flight Lieutenant Ian Macdonnell Sutherland-Brown.	
Protestant Chapel	1963	1 light Dove	Robert McCausland Limited	In memory of 4482 Squadron Leader Donald Eaton Galloway Class of 1959	
Protestant Chapel	1963	1 light open book	Robert McCausland Limited	In memory of 6229 Lieutenant John Carson first to leave the Class of 64.	
Protestant Chapel	1963	1 light lamb of God	Robert McCausland Limited	I thank all who loved me in their hearts with love and thanks from mine. 1900 Group Captain Douglas Edwards	
Protestant Chapel	1963	1 light chalice	Robert McCausland Limited	In memory of 10557 Lieutenant Kris K. Gammeljord Class of 1975	
Protestant Chapel	2014	1 light chalice	Robert McCausland Limited	In memory of 6229 John Carson R22eR Class of 1964.	6229 John Carson window
Yeo Hall	1966	1 light R.M.C. Crest	Robert McCausland Limited	In memory of the class of 1958 who have died	
Yeo Hall	1965	1 light Canadian Coat of Arms and 10 Provincial crests	Robert McCausland Limited	O Canada, we stand on guard for thee. Don des anciens du college section de Montréal-1965.	
Yeo Hall	1942	1 light Cadet at ease	Robert McCausland Limited	to the memory of those members of the class of 42 who have given their lives for Canada	
Yeo Hall	1964	1 light Visionary Christ with Cadet	Robert McCausland Limited	In loving memory of 4954 F/O Peter Gordon Robson graduated May 1960 died on active duty September 1960	
Yeo Hall	1964	1 light Three Services in Battledress	Robert McCausland Limited	In memory of their gallant fallen classmates presented by the class entering in 1933	Memorial Stained Glass window, Class of 1933, Royal Military College of Canada
Yeo Hall, Memorial Hall outside chapels	1964	1 light "RMC and Tri-Service Crests"	Robert McCausland Limited	Presented by Toronto branch R.M.C. Club of Canada 1964	
Yeo Hall, Memorial Hall outside chapels	1934	1 light Last Post	Robert McCausland Limited	Presented by the class entering RMC in 1934 as a memorial to fallen classmates	
Yeo Hall, Memorial Hall outside chapels	1964	1 light Cadet with Reversed Arms	Robert McCausland Limited	Presented by the graduating class 29 May 1964	100p
Mackenzie Building	1956	1 light Navy	Robert Jekyll	from the Class of 1956	
Mackenzie Building	1956	1 light Army	Robert Jekyll	from the Class of 1956	
Mackenzie Building	1956	1 light Air	Robert Jekyll	from the Class of 1956	
Mackenzie Building	c. 1920	1 light St Michael		*Gentleman Cadet James Wylie Logie (drowned 1913); window donated by his father Hon. James Wylie (1789–1854) and his mother Mary Wylie née Hamilton.	
Mackenzie Building Memorial Stairway	1920	1 light Emblem Royal Military College of Canada crest & motto	Robert McCausland Limited	Gentleman Cadet Douglas Burr Plumb (drowned 1903); window donated by his stepfather Wallace Nesbitt (1858–1930)	
Mackenzie Building Memorial Stairway	1920	1 light Antique window Sir Galahad		*Gentleman Cadet Arthur Latrobe Smith, (drowned 1913); window donated by mother and brother	
Stone Frigate	1987	1 light spider web		by Stone Frigate Class of 1983	
St. Andrew's Presbyterian Church (Kingston, Ontario)		1 light Antique window RMC crest and motto		*Royal Military College of Canada stained glass window	

== Commemorative and memorial trees ==
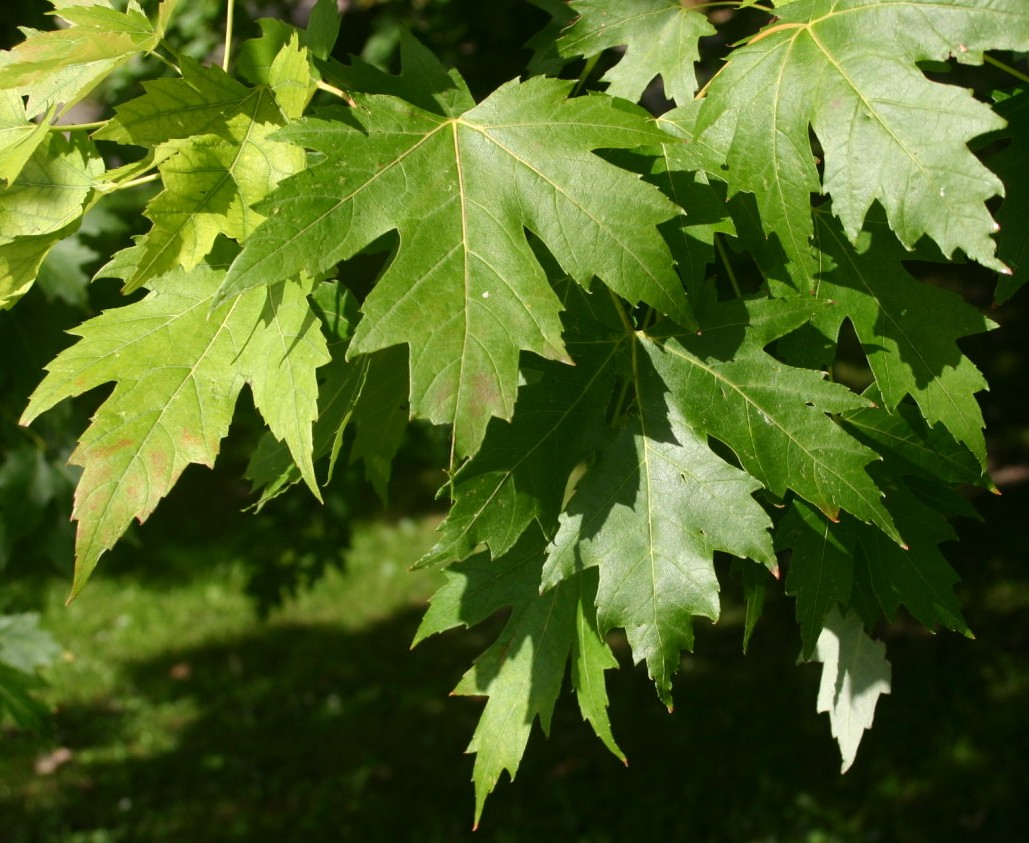
Maple

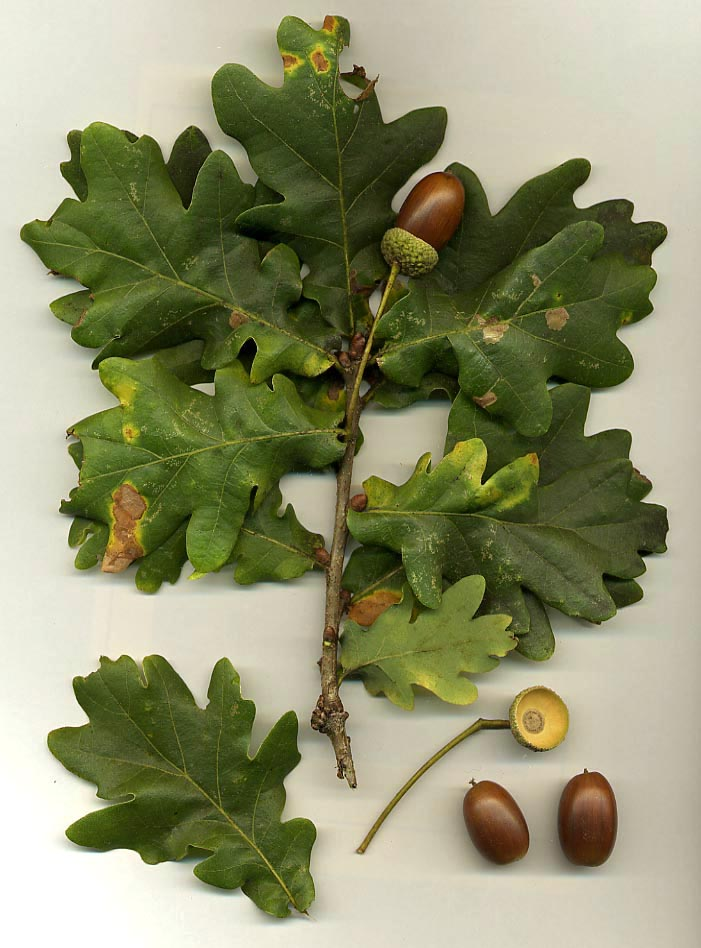
Oak

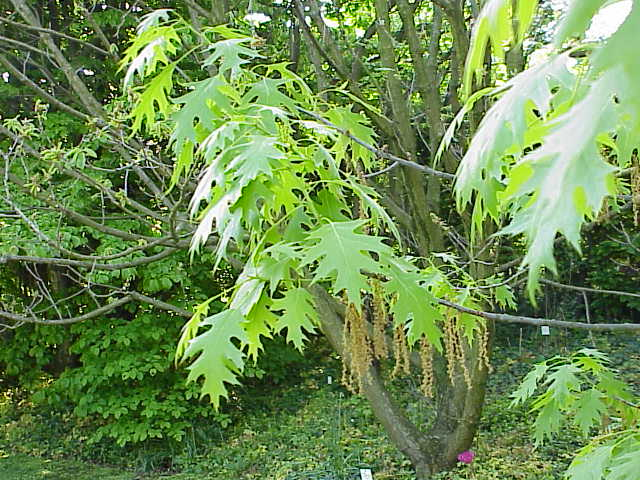
Red Oak

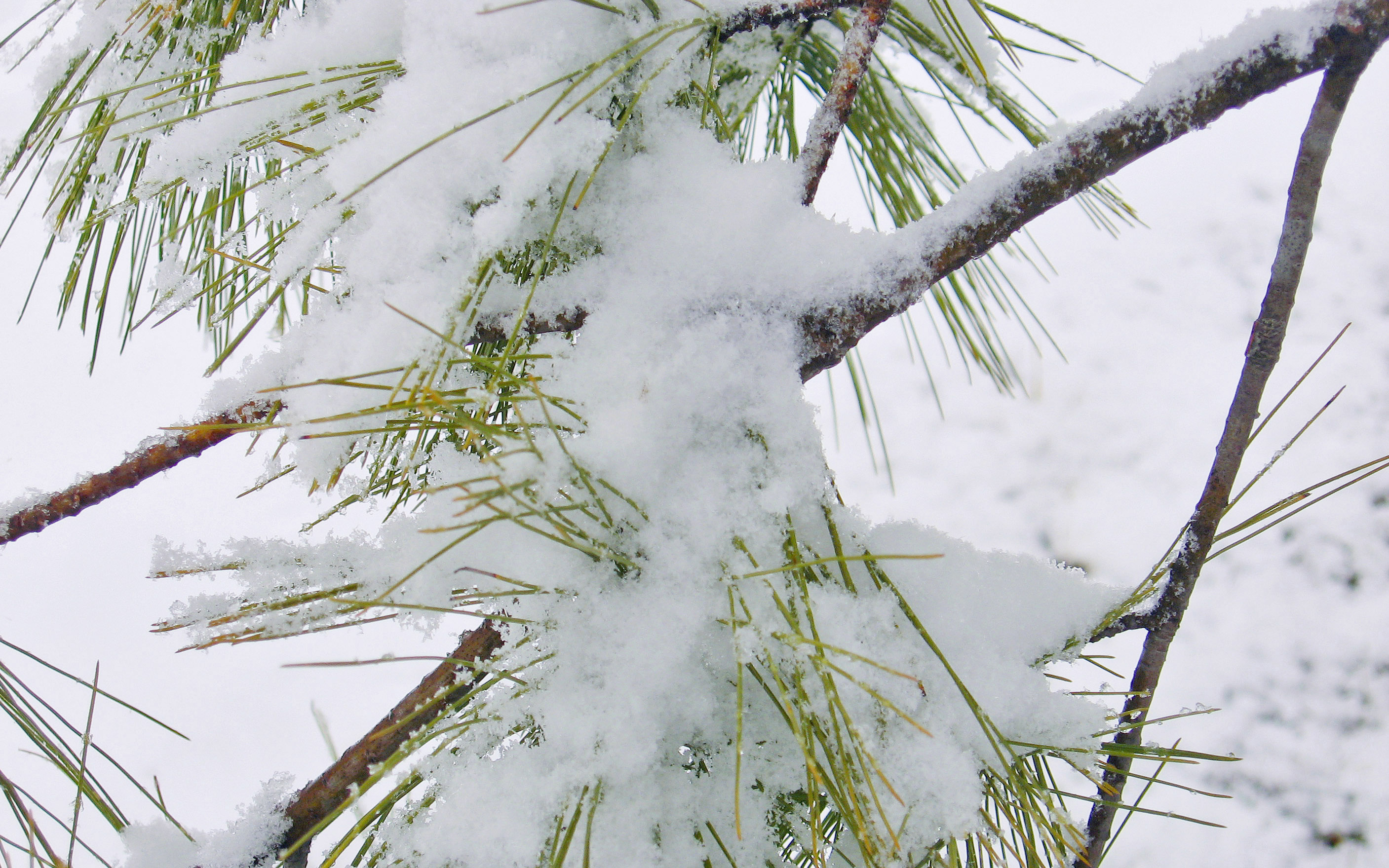
Pine

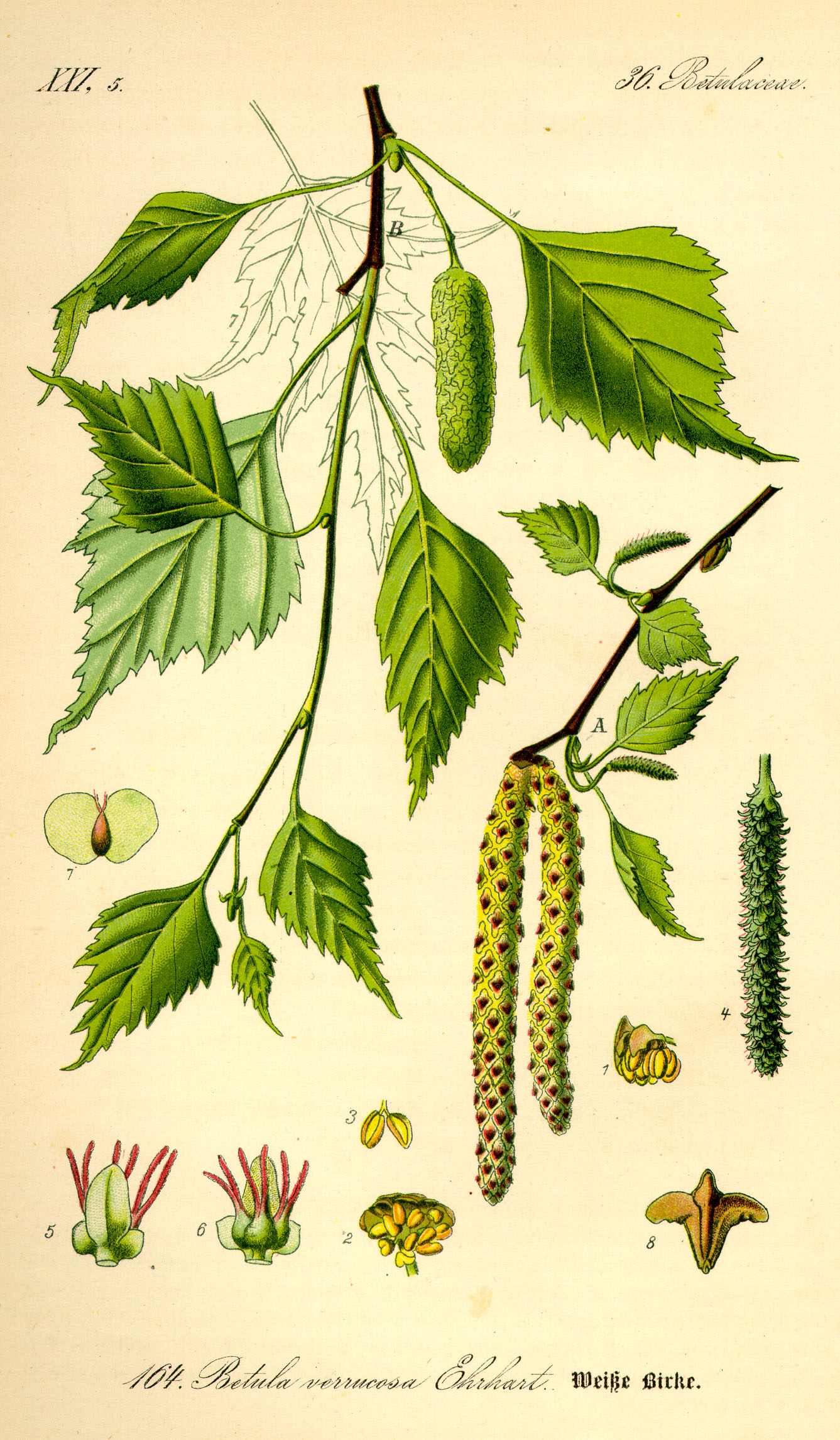
Silver Birch

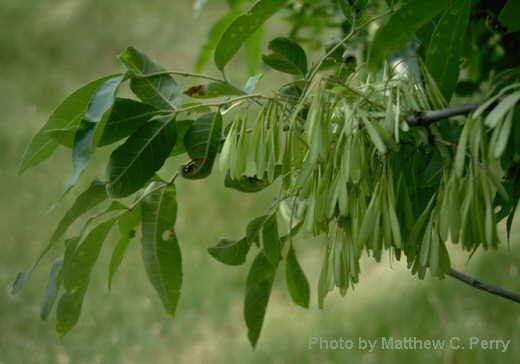
White Ash

Memorial trees	Description
Red oaks, 13 trees on west side Precision Dr.	Class of 1962 on occasion of 25th anniversary 1987.
Trees with plaque, on Duty Drive (north side Hwy #2)	from Class of xxxx
Grove of eight silver birch trees with plaque	commemorates eight classmates killed in the Great War 1914–1918 by Class of 1910.
Tree with plaque near Massey Library	from UTPM Class of 1989 (unnamed memorial to Mr. Cliff Watt, Library Staff)
Tree with plaque on stone	In memory of (#17333) Kelly Gawne, Class of 1990
White ash trees, seven trees on Bishop Road	in memory of seven classmates killed in the Second World War - Class of 1936.
maple and pine trees at Crerar Entrance	in memory of classmates killed in action from the Class of 1939.
oak trees, 17 trees on Precision Dr	in memory of classmates killed in the Second World War from the Class of 1940. (Note, the class of 1940 was the last "war-class" to attend RMC. In 1942 the college was closed for the remainder of World War II and during that time the College Colours were safeguarded in St. George's Cathedral in Kingston).
Maple tree with plaque (behind Currie Bldg)	"en mémoire de Nicole Bérubé 1949-2003", Second Language teacher.
Tree with plaque (near Hewett House)	in memory of Jane Dacey by her friends, 1985. (wife of Dr. J.R. Dacey, Director of Studies (i.e.: Principal) 1967-1978.)
a grove of 10 maples with stone table and two stone benches	in memory of classmates killed in the Second World War by the class entering in 1935.

== Monuments ==
Commemorations	Description
Bill & Alphie	Bill & Alphie's, the on-campus cadet pub in Yeo Hall, is named after Bruce Bairnsfather's Great War cartoon characters. Stone carvings based on Old Bill & little Alphie, appear at the entrance to RMC's Yeo Hall.
Torpedo Mk IX	presented by RN for RMC centenary 1976
Upper pillar or Column	RMC observatory
bronze 24' standing figure of a cadet, Sculpture Truth Duty Valour 1976 (or Brucie) by William McElcheran	RMC centennial (1976) gift of RMC Club
Sculpture of obstacle course "To Overcome" by John Boxtel	Gift of Class of 1991
Wooden Gates Fort Frederick with 1971 plaque	in remembrance of the days when Fort Frederick was a recruit refuge, by Class entering in 1931
stone Benches (5) near river opposite Commandant's House.	Plaque commemorating Battle of Vimy Ridge. (CMR) Class of 1992 -transferred to RMC from Collège militaire royal de Saint-Jean c1995
Bailey bridge, (with plaques) a portable pre-fabricated truss bridge, designed for use by military engineering units to bridge up to 60 m (200 ft) gaps by Donald Bailey, a civil servant in the British War Office.	to commemorate 100th Anniversary of the Engineering Branch and close ties between Branch and RMC. Dedicated Oct 2004.
"Centennial Bell" (located on yard-arm)	presented by California Branch RMC Club 1984
Stone (located north side Fort LaSalle)	"Class of 1998"
Stone pillar located near AMS, former Cadet Mess & Recreation Centre	to commemorate the 100th anniversary of the founding of RMC by Class of 1976

== Plaques ==
There are numerous plaques erected by federal, provincial, municipal and private authorities on the grounds of the Royal Military College of Canada.

Plaque	Description	Photo
50th anniversary of College 1926	Plaque Currie Building tablet by RMC Club	
Memorial benches	various alumni, staff, professors	
125th anniversary of the completion of the inaugural St. John Ambulance Canada first aid course conducted in Ontario	The inaugural St. John Ambulance Canada first aid course conducted in Ontario was offered at the Royal Military College of Canada for the benefit of gentlemen Cadets and Staff in 1883-4.; St. John Council for Ontario placed a plaque on 6 June 2009 on the clock tower at the Royal Military College of Canada.	
wall		
Astronomical Observatory	astronomical observatory 1886-1951	
Avro CF-100 Canuck Mark 5 plaque	Presented by the class of 1972 to commemorate rededication on October 6, 1996.	
Canadian flag plaque	"Near this Parade Square, in March 1964, while viewing the College Flag atop Mackenzie Building, Col. the Hon George Stanley, then Dean of Arts, Royal Military College of Canada, first suggested to Col. the Hon. John Matheson, then Member of Parliament for Leeds, that the RMC College Flag should form the basis of the National Flag. The two collaborated on a design which was ultimately approved by Parliament and by Royal Proclamation adopted as the National Flag of Canada as of the 15th of February 1965."; Plaque on Currie Bldg installed by the College about 1985.	
City of Kingston resolution to congratulate RMC on receiving university status.	Plaque Currie Building	
Dockyard Bell	Royal Military College Class of 1931	
*International Hockey Series plaque, RMC vs USMA, Currie Hall, RMC		
"Sir Édouard Girouard 1867-1932."	Plaque (Federal) National Historic Person Historic Sites and Monuments Board of Canada	
King George VI and Queen Elizabeth visit the college in 1939.	Currie Building plaque	
"Kingston Navy Yard"	Plaque (Federal) National Historic Site	
"The Royal Military College of Canada"	Ontario Heritage Trust plaque near the entrance to the college grounds at the gates on stone wall between Fort LaSalle and Fort Sauvé, near the north end of Point Frederick Drive.; The first officer training college in Canada, the Royal Military College opened in 1876 with 18 cadets receiving military and academic instruction. In 1959, it was granted university status.	
"Point Frederick"	"A naturally defensible site, Point Frederick was reserved as early as 1788 for construction of a battery. Various fortifications were built on the point over the next 50 years. The martello tower still in existence was one of four erected to fortify Kingston during the Oregon Crisis in 1846."; Plaque Ontario Heritage Trust	
Point Frederick Buildings	Marker: Historic Sites and Monuments Board of Canada; "A strategic location for the defence of the Loyalist settlement at Cataraqui (Kingston), this point was reserved in 1788 and named after Sir Frederick Haldimand, Governor of Quebec (1778-86). In 1790-91 a guardhouse and storehouse were built. By 1792 a dockyard was in operation and during the War of 1812 this vital naval base was fortified. On November 10, 1812, the Fort Frederick battery took part in repulsing an American naval squadron under Commodore Isaac Chauncey. This structure, one of four massive stone Martello towers built to strengthen Kingston's defences, was erected in 1846-47 during the Oregon boundary crisis between the United States and Britain. In 1852 the dockyard was closed and in 1870 Fort Frederick was abandoned."	
"Point Frederick Buildings" Point Frederick Martello Tower	Inside the walls of the tower, on the grounds of the Royal Military College of Canada (Federal) National Historic Site Plaque; "This peninsula, headquarters of the Provincial Marine (c.1790-1813), and of the Royal Navy (1813-1853), was the major British naval base on Lake Ontario during the War of 1812. Buildings surviving from this period include the Naval Hospital, the Guard House complex, and the Stone Frigate. On the southern part of the peninsula stands Fort Frederick, erected in 1812-13 but completely rebuilt in 1846. In 1875, the Point was chosen as the site of the Royal Military College of Canada which admitted its first class in June 1876."	
"Royal Military College of Canada Memorial Arch"	Marker: Royal Military College Club of Canada 1923	
Royal Military College of Canada ex-cadets post World War II	memorial plaque	
Royal Military College of Canada Gentlemen cadets Roll of Honour, Currie Hall, Currie Building, Royal Military College of Canada		
"Rush–Bagot Agreement"	Ontario Heritage Trust Plaque in front of the Stone Frigate building on the NE corner of General Crerar Crescent and Valour Road, on the grounds of the Royal Military College of Canada; "Under the terms of this 1817 arms-limitation agreement, the United States and Great Britain agreed to dismantle most of their armed vessels on the Great Lakes and Lake Champlain and to construct no new warships. The agreement, technically, is still in force."	
"Stone Frigate"	Ontario Heritage Trust Plaque in front of Stone Frigate.; "This large stone building, completed in 1820, was designed to hold gear and rigging from British warships dismantled in compliance with the Rush–Bagot Agreement. It served as a barracks briefly in 1837-38, and by 1876 had been refitted to house the Royal Military College of Canada."	
"Sir James Lucas Yeo 1782–1818"	Plaque (Federal) National Historic Person	
Royal Military College of Canada 3 ex-cadets pre WWI	memorial plaque	
*Fort Frederick World Heritage Site, Kingston, Ontario	UNESCO World Heritage Site Plaque	
Excavation Plaque detail, Fort Frederick Museum,		
Prince of Wales's Leinster Regiment Royal Canadians plaque in Senior Service Mess, RMC	enumerates the Regiment's locations of service	

== Other ==
Memorial	Description
Casey (the horse)	Gravestone beside Commandant's House
WAG Gallant Dog	Gravestone beside Hewett House
Ordnance QF 25 pounder British field gun/howitzer introduced into service just before World War II	in memory of #1022 Maj-Gen Harold Oswald Neville Brownfield (joined RMC 1913-left with war certificate 1914) served with the RCA in France and Belgium 1915-18; served as associate professor of tactics, RMC 1934–37; BRA First Canadian Army 1945.; from widow Wilhelmina Brownfield c. 1965.; refurbished with the financial support of the ex cadet club 2010
Stone	In memory of (#S107) LCol (Ret'd) George Holbrook C.M. and (9584) Ian Moffat (RMC 1973) Class of 1973.
Fountain	In honour of 21707 Kleon Lowell Sproule (RMC 2000), Class of 2000
Crerar Entranceway	in memory of #749 General Crerar (plaque donated by Class of 1935)
Carriageway Gates at Crerar Entrance	"in memory of those who have gone before" by Class entering in 1934.
Letters on Crerar Entranceway	donated in memory of #15423 Jean R Perreault by Class of 1986
Coat-of-Arms (bronze, with correct motto) on Crerar Entrance	donated in memory of #2085 W.E Fleury (RMC 1929) by his family in 1986. [Note plastic Coat-of-Arms incorrectly displaying the motto of College Militaire Royale CMR was put up by the College under the direct of the then Commandant, BGen Emond, 1995.]
Pedestrian Gates, walks, Crerar Entrance	in memory of fallen classmates by the Class joining in 1937
Pylon and plaque	Class of 1940 (east side Precision Dr.) re: 17 trees
Sidewalk "Route 92" (Memorial Arch to Hwy #2)	in memory of #18287 Josh Andrews (RMC 1992) and #18531 Trent Woolridge (RMC 1992) by Class of 1992.
Bench behind Currie Building	in remembrance of #3098 Glen Tivy (RMC 1953), #3132 Dutch Holland (RMC 1953) and #3140 Bob Kostiuk (RMC 1953) by Class of 1953
Bench-behind Currie Bldg	in memory of #6842 Ted Hague (RMC 1966) from his brother, Commandant #9098 BGen (ret'd) Ken Hague (RMC 1972)
Bench pair behind Currie, near Sawyer building	in memory of Maj. Peter Carr-Harris and Lt. Ella Carr-Harris from Advocates Society in honour of their president.
Bench pair behind Currie	in memory of fallen comrades by the "United Kingdom" Branch of the RMC Club (n.d.)
Bench-north soccer pitch	to honour (memory of) Prof. Giuseppe Lepore
Sword of honour	No. 913, former Battalion Sergeant Major C.B.R. MacDonald (RMC 1914)'s Sword of Honour, which he won in 1914, was presented by his brother to RMC in 1965 as a memorial to C.B.R. MacDonald.; No. 1514, former Battalion Sergeant Major H.A. Richardson (RMC 1923), presented to RMC in 1965, the Sword of Honour which he won in 1923 as a memorial to the Class of 1919–1923.
marine sextant circa 1820-30s	No. 503 John Strickland Leitch, C.E., presented Sea Captain John Leitch's old marine sextant to RMC in May, 1964; Captain Leitch commanded a Cunard Line steamship in the 1830s.

== See also ==
- Military history of Canada
- History of the Canadian Army
- Canadian Forces
