= Navy League of Canada =

Canadian nonprofit organization

- Ligue navale du Canada
- Flag of the Navy League of Canada
- Active: 1895 - present
- Country: Canada
- Type: Youth Organization
- Role: Cadet programs
- Headquarters: Ottawa, Ontario, Canada

The Navy League of Canada (French: Ligue navale du Canada) is a nonprofit organization founded in 1895 and incorporated in 1918. Originally formed to promote maritime issues to Canadians, the Navy League is the non-governmental partner of the Department of National Defence and supports the Royal Canadian Sea Cadets program. The Navy League also independently delivers the Navy League Cadet program for boys and girls between the ages of nine and twelve.

== History ==
The latter half of the nineteenth century saw rapid expansion and development of the British Empire and, with it, the dependence on ocean shipping routes for its trade and defence. At the same time, the German Empire was becoming increasingly aggressive and competing step by step with Britain. Concern as to the adequacy of the Royal Navy of that day to defend the widely separated components of the Empire and their essential shipping gave rise to the formation in Britain in 1895 of a society with the primary aim of ensuring an adequate naval defence. This was the Navy League, organized with local branches in towns and cities and drawing its support from people of all walks of life, but interested in the problem of ocean trade and naval defence. The movement expanded rapidly and before the end of that year, branches had established themselves abroad, including one in Toronto whose warrant, dated 16 December 1895, now hangs in the National Office in Ottawa.

From its earliest days, the Navy League has been an active organization. In October 1895, the group in Toronto, in the course of forming the branch there, had already prepared a submission to the Canadian government on the subject of maritime defence and the need for a Naval Reserve training program. Continued efforts in support of improved naval defence, either as an imperial or national effort, helped the government when it was formulating Canada's naval policy and establishing the Canadian Naval Service, forerunner of the Canadian Navy, in 1910. In these early years, the branches in Canada supported informally a youth training programme aimed at encouraging young men towards a seafaring career, and providing basic training in citizenship and seamanship.

The First World War placed heavy commitments on the Navy League, with its activities expanding into recruiting of Naval and Merchant Navy personnel, operation of hostels for seafaring personnel, provision of welfare services to the dependents of seamen and, in the final stages, the rehabilitation of Naval Veterans.

In the years following World War I, the Navy League took particular interest in seeking continued support for a Canadian flag, the Merchant Marine and maintained shore hostel facilities for the benefit of seafaring personnel. The training of boys was formalized under the name of "Boys' Naval Brigades" across the country; this became the main raison d'être for many local branches during the Depression. The establishment of the Royal Canadian Naval Volunteer Reserve in 1923 was much assisted by the enrolment of graduates of this scheme; a parallel apprenticeship programme was set up with Canadian shipping companies to enrol ex-cadets in the Merchant Marine. The Boys' Naval Brigade name was changed at about this time to the Navy League Sea Cadets to permit infusion of funds from the Department of the Militia.

With the outbreak of the Second World War in 1939, the Navy League was once more involved in War Services activities. This included the operation of 24 hostels in various port areas, such as the Sea Gull Cub in Halifax, the provision of amenities and special clothing supplies for visiting seamen, as well as those of the RCN and Canadian Merchant Navy. The Navy League came to consider itself "the nursery of seamen" for the RCN. The Navy League also assisted in the establishment in Ottawa of HMCS Bytown Wardroom.

With the end of the Second World War and the closing out of its War Services operations, the Navy League was again able to turn its attention to its primary objectives; continued support of youth training and promoting a knowledge of maritime affairs. The minimum age limit of the Sea Cadets having been set at 14 years, there was felt to be a need for an organization to cater to interested boys under that limit. Thus in 1948, the Navy League established The Navy League Cadet Corps for younger boys. This development was followed in 1950 by the establishment of the Navy League Wrenette Corps for girls. Wrenettes no longer exist as a program as girls are part of Navy League Cadet Corps and Royal Canadian Sea Cadets.

=== Critical dates ===
1895 - First Canadian Branch formed
1910 - Canadian Navy established
1914 - Recruiting and Welfare Services, World War I
1918 - First Canadian Boy's Naval Brigade formed
1918 - Federal Charter approved establishing the Navy League of Canada
1923 - Boy's Naval Brigade name changed to Sea Cadet Corps
1939 - Welfare Services, World War II
1941 - Canadian Navy became partner in the Sea Cadet movement
1942 - King George VI agreed to be Admiral, Royal Canadian Sea Cadets
1943 - Scholarship program introduced
1948 - Navy League Cadet program established
1950 - Navy League Wrenette program established
1975 - Girls were permitted to become sea cadets (as well as army and air cadets)
1995 - The 100th Anniversary of the Navy League of Canada
1997- Last Navy League Wrenette Corps closed (NLWC Centennial)

== Memorials ==
At the Royal Military College of Canada, outside Currie Hall in Kingston, Ontario stained glass windows relate to the history of the Navy League.

- Donated as a tribute to all national presidents of the Navy League of Canada for the proven love of country in promoting patriotism... seapower ... youth training, the window bestows 'Honour and Glory to patriotic citizens who have and will serve Canada.' The window features images of the Royal Canadian Sea Cadets, Navy League Cadets and Navy League Wrenettes.
- In memory of David H. Gibson, C.B.E. National President, Navy League of Canada, 1938-1952 a stained glass window features images of a young sailor and God behind the ships' wheel. The window is dedicated to Canadians who in defence of the country went down to the sea in ships. The window includes a poem by H.R. Gillarm: "Proudly in ships they sailed to sea. Ahead their goal, perhaps eternity. But with God as their pilot they had no fear facing all danger as their course was clear. Their cargo? The record of their life. Some good, some bad, some peace, some strife."
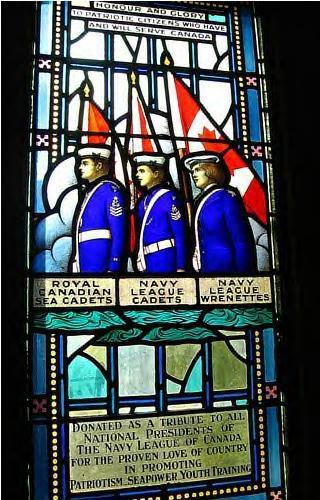
Navy League Wrennette Corp Navy League Cadet Corps (Canada) Royal Canadian Sea Cadets Memorial Stained Glass Window, Currie Hall, Currie Building, Royal Military College of Canada

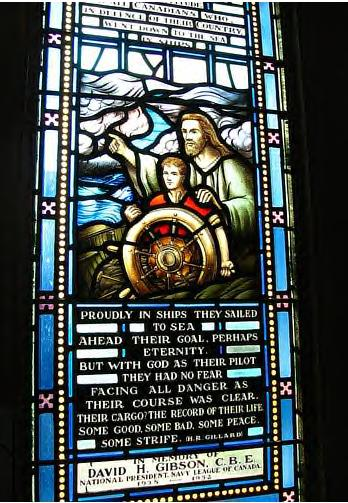
Naval Memorial Stained Glass Window, Currie Hall, Currie Building, Royal Military College of Canada

== Royal Canadian Sea Cadets ==
The Royal Canadian Sea Cadets is a youth program for twelve to eighteen year olds, delivered by the Canadian Forces and supported by the Navy League of Canada in the community. The program has its origins in the Boy’s Naval Brigades, becoming the Royal Canadian Sea Cadets after the Royal Canadian Navy became a partner. Girls have been allowed in the program since 1975. As of 2019, there were approximately 235 Sea Cadet Corps in Canada, and approximately 8,000 cadets.

Along with the Royal Canadian Army Cadets and Royal Canadian Air Cadets, the aim of the Sea Cadet organization is to: develop in youth the attributes of good citizenship and leadership; promote physical fitness; and stimulate an interest in the sea, land, and air activities of the Canadian Forces.

== Navy League Cadet Corps ==
The Navy League Cadet Corps is a nautically-themed youth program for young people aged nine to twelve. The program aims to develop patriotism, good citizenship, a sense of duty, self-discipline, self-respect, and respect for others. While the program uses a naval environment (ranks, terminology, etc.), there is no affiliation between Navy League Cadets and the Canadian Forces. The program is led entirely by civilian volunteers in each community. As of 2019, there were approximately 110 Navy League Cadet Corps in Canada, with about 3000 cadets enrolled in the program.

== Maritime Affairs ==
The Navy League’s Maritime Affairs program aims to inform Canadians about issues affecting their use of the oceans. Beginning in 1895, the Navy League lobbied for the creation of a Naval Service for Canada. Having realized that goal in 1910, the Navy League continued to support the Navy and promote the welfare of sailors.

During both World Wars, and into the late 1960s, the Navy League operated numerous hostels and Sailor’s Homes, on both coasts. The Navy League Ditty Bag, (a small gift bag full of clothing, food and sundries) was a welcome comfort to sailors throughout this time.

Over the last decade, the Navy League has diversified to examine all aspects of ocean use. They have addressed issues of Ocean Management, Fisheries and Environmental protection, maritime trade and the preservation of Canada’s Arctic archipelago. In 2003, the group published Canada, An Incomplete Maritime Nation which outlines a broad range of public policy issues concerning the sustainable use of Canada’s Ocean territory.

== Flags ==
The NLC has used many flags throughout the years. Early on, a Union Jack defaced with the badge of the NLC was used, albeit unofficially. In 1918, a request was made to the British Admiralty to use a Blue Ensign defaced with the badge of the Navy League on the fly. This was rejected, but a second request in 1928 was granted, although with a white ensign. The positions of the N and the L on the badge used from 1929-2011 were reversed when the flag was flown in French-speaking regions to reflect the French name for the Navy League, which is la Ligue navale du Canada.

In 1965, when the Maple Leaf Flag was introduced, the Union Jack in the canton was replaced by the Maple Leaf Flag. In 2011, a new flag was introduced, with a new logo which was not in monotone. Although a new badge had been in use for years, the flag was not updated until the replacement of that logo in 2011. However, the pre-2011 version is still in fairly common use in corps where that flag has not worn out.

An unofficial flag used in the early 1900s

Flag granted by the British Admiralty for use by the NLC in 1929

In 1965, the flag was updated with the introduction of the Maple Leaf Flag

With the third badge redesign since the granting of the NLC White Ensign in 1928, the flag was updated to reflect this change in 2011

== Organization and structure ==
The Navy League is a volunteer organization with 264 branches organized into 12 Divisions. Each Division President sits on a National Board of Directors. Members of the Navy League volunteer in their community to support two youth programs, Royal Canadian Sea Cadets and Navy League Cadets, or to build awareness of maritime issues.

While any person 'of good character' can be a member of the Navy League, volunteers working with cadets have to undergo a screening program which includes a police check known as Vulnerable Sector Screening. This program was put in place after the Mount Cashel Orphanage sexual/physical abuse scandal and other abuse cases raised awareness about potential risks to youth.

== Captain Vancouver Case ==
In 2006, the Department of National Defence reached an eight million dollar settlement with victims of abuse at the Captain Vancouver Sea Cadet Corps.

== See also ==
- Royal Canadian Sea Cadets
- Navy League Cadet Programme
- Navy League Cadet Officers
- Navy League Cadet Corps of the United States
- Navy League Wrennette Corp
