= NLWC =

NLWC may refer to:

- National League Wild Card Game, an annual playoff game in Major League Baseball
- Nittany Lion Wrestling Club, an amateur wrestling training center
- Navy League Wrennette Corp, a girls Navy cadet corps in Canada, active 1950–1997
