= Percy Erskine Nobbs =

Canadian architect (1875–1964)

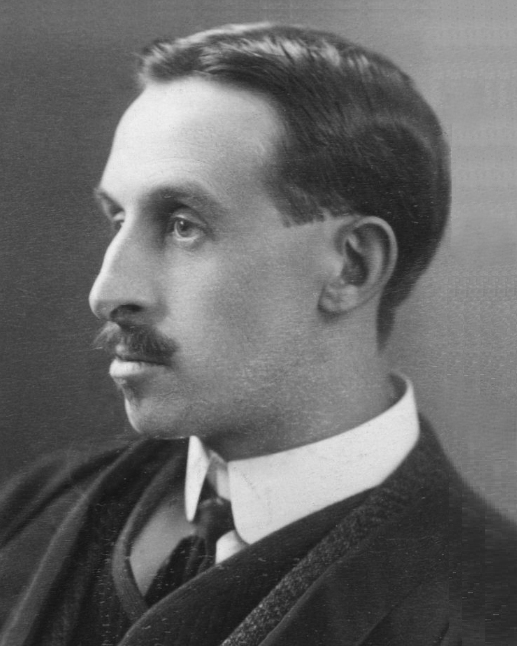
- Born: 11 August 1875; Haddington, East Lothian
- Died: 5 November 1964 (aged 89); Montreal, Quebec
- Education: Edinburgh Collegiate School; University of Edinburgh
- Spouse: Mary Cecilia Shepherd (m. 1909)

Percy Erskine Nobbs FRIBA RCA (11 August 1875 – 5 November 1964) was a Scottish-Canadian architect who was born in Haddington, East Lothian, and trained in the United Kingdom. Educated at the Edinburgh Collegiate School and Edinburgh University, he spent most of his career in the Montreal area. Often working in partnership with George Taylor Hyde, Nobbs designed a great many of what would become Montreal's heritage buildings and was a key Canadian proponent of the Arts and Crafts Movement in architecture. He served as the director of McGill University's School of Architecture for ten years. He designed many buildings on the campus as well as McGill's Coat of Arms, which continues to be used today.

== Architecture career ==
He designed the fire station on Euston Road in the "Arts and Crafts" style. It was built in 1901-2 and still stands. Nobbs had already received awards and won prizes as a practicing architect when he came to McGill University in 1903 to teach architecture. He got permission to practice architecture while teaching and soon obtained commissions for private homes and institutional buildings. His designs for homes had the distinction of paying a great deal of attention to the siting and orientation of the building and the placement of the windows. He considered this at least as important as what the home actually looked like. He called it "building for Prospect as well as Aspect," and designed many an impressive mansion in this way. The magnitude of such mansions can be grasped by studying through his various plans and blueprints, such as the house of the Quebec Alpha of the Phi Delta Theta fraternity in Montreal. The initial plans divided the house across 4 floors, 11 bedrooms, a library, and 2 servants' rooms. These documents are currently kept in the Canadian Architecture Collection of the McGill University Archives.

In partnership with Cecil Burgess, Percy Erskine Nobbs designed the J.B. Porter House on McTavish Street, Montreal, which has been demolished. In 1906-1907 Nobbs was in a temporary partnership with David Robertson Brown.

== Projects ==
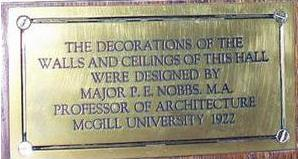
Major Percy Erskine Nobbs plaque @ Currie Hall Royal Military College of Canada

Nobbs designed the interior decorative program of the Currie Hall at the Royal Military College of Canada in Kingston, Ontario. The Currie Building decorations evoke the achievements of the Canadian Corps in the Great War, and with the British Monarchy.

Nobbs and Hyde designed many McGill University buildings: Power House (1909); Strathcona Medical Building (1923); Pathology Building (1923); Pulp & Paper Research Institute (1927). Nobbs and Hyde remodeled many McGill University buildings: MacDonald Engineering Building, reconstruction after a fire in 1907; a major addition to the University Library, McTavish Street (1921–22); addition of West Wing at Royal Victoria College (1930–31). Nobbs and Hyde provided interiors and furniture for the Osler Memorial Library (1923). Many of his drawings for McGill University buildings can be found in his archive, held in the Canadian Architecture Collection at McGill University.

Nobbs and Hyde designed several commercial buildings in Montréal, including the University Club building on Mansfield Street, completed in 1913, and the Hartt Shoe Store at 467 St. Catherine Street West, completed in 1916.

Nobbs and Frank Darling designed the master plan for the University of Alberta in 1909–1910. With Cecil S. Burgess, Nobbs designed the Provincial College of Medicine (1920–21). Nobbs designed the Arts Building (1914–15); laboratories and Power House (1914);

Nobbs and Hyde won the competition for the war memorial in Regina.

Building	Year completed	Builder	Style	Location	Image
Arts Building, University of Alberta	1909-10	Percy Erskine Nobbs & Frank Darling	Romanesque Revival architecture	Edmonton, Alberta	
Pathological Institute Building, McGill University	1925	Percy Erskine Nobbs	Romanesque Revival architecture	Montreal, Quebec	
Osler Library, McGill University	1925	Percy Erskine Nobbs	Romanesque Revival architecture	Montreal, Quebec	
Redpath Library Building, McGill University	1935	Percy Erskine Nobbs	Romanesque Revival architecture	Montreal, Quebec	
Currie Hall, Royal Military College of Canada	1922	Percy Erskine Nobbs	Romanesque Revival architecture	Kingston, Ontario	

He designed the University Club building in Montreal, associated with McGill University, which was completed in 1913 and was eventually registered as a monument historique of Quebec. He also designed the McGill University Coat of Arms three years into his directorship at the McGill School of Architecture, which continues to be used by the university today.

== Other activities ==
He was an accomplished athlete in fencing, representing Canada at the 1908 Olympics and throughout his life he was an avid fisherman, founding the Atlantic Salmon Federation due to his love of fishing. He published two books, now both out of print, entitled Fencing Tactics and Salmon Tactics. His talent as a draftsman and painter—he was an RCA—was also notable.

== Honours ==
He was elected an Academician of the Royal Canadian Academy of Arts in 1920 and, in 1924, became President of the Quebec Association of Architects. In 1928, he was named President of the Town Planning Institute of Canada. In 1929, he was elected to the Royal Society of Arts and also became President of the Royal Architectural Institute in Canada.

Cultural offices
Preceded by Frederick Stanely Haines	Acting President of the Royal Canadian Academy of Arts; 1942-1943	Succeeded by Ernest Fosbery
