= Navy League Cadet Corps (Canada) =

Navy League Cadet
- Active: 1948 - present
- Country: Canada
- Type: Youth Organization
- Part of: Navy League of Canada
- Headquarters: Ottawa, Ontario, Canada

The Navy League Cadet Corps (French: Corps de cadets de la Ligue navale) was created by the Navy League of Canada for boys in 1948, and the Navy League Wrennette Corps was formed for girls in 1950. The Wrennette program no longer exists, since the Navy League Cadet Corps are now open to boys and girls between the ages of 9 and 12.

The Navy League Cadet programme is separate from the Canadian Cadet Organizations. It is solely sponsored by the Navy League of Canada, and it is not supported by the Department of National Defence like the Royal Canadian Sea Cadets. The Navy League Cadet programme is led by civilian volunteers, who are Navy League Officers supervised by local branches of the Navy League of Canada.

The training programme of the Navy League Cadets introduces youth to the training available in the Royal Canadian Sea Cadets and is modified to serve the needs of the younger age group.

== Uniform ==
The uniform worn by Navy League cadets has elements of the uniform of the old Royal Canadian Navy. The uniform of the Navy League Cadets includes:

- Seaman's cap ("white-top");
- Cap ribbon ("tally"), indicating cadet corps name;
- Medium-blue long-sleeve shirt (with insignia);
- White lanyard;
- White web belt;
- Navy-blue trousers;
- Black shoes or boots;
- Winter coat (pattern varies from corps to corps).

A corps T-shirt and ball cap is often worn during such activities as sailing and sports.

== Flag ==
This flag is used by Navy League Cadet Corps as a corps flag Jack flag. It replaced the flag of the Navy League of Canada for this purpose in 2000, which is used as a jack.

== Ranks ==
The ranks of the Navy League Cadets are based on those of the Royal Canadian Navy and Royal Canadian Sea Cadets, although they do not match exactly. The Navy League Cadet ranks are:

CDT 8	Chief Petty Officer First Class (CPO1) / premier maître de 1^{re}classe (pm 1)
CDT 7	Chief Petty Officer Second Class (CPO2) / premier maître de 2^{e}classe (pm 2)
CDT 6	Petty Officer First Class (PO1) / maître de 1^{re} classe (m 1)
CDT 5	Petty Officer Second Class (PO2) / maître de 2^{e} lasse (m 2)
CDT 4	Leading Cadet (LC) / matelot de 1^{er} classe (mat 1)
CDT 3	Able Cadet (AC) / matelot de 2^{e} classe (mat 2)
CDT 2	Ordinary Cadet (OC) / matelot de 3^{e} classe (mat 3)
CDT 1	New Entry (NE)* / nouveau/nouvelle entré(e) (ne)

*Not technically a rank.

The ranks of Navy League Cadet Officers are also similar to those of the Royal Canadian Navy. Embellished with a maple leaf they are not the same. It is also common practice for Navy League Cadet Officers to use NL with their rank title, in order to show that they represent the civilian Navy League, I.E. Lt(NL). The Navy League Cadet Officers ranks are:

Commander (Cdr) / Capitaine de frégate (capf)

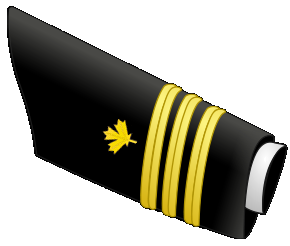

Lieutenant-Commander (LCdr) / capitaine de corvette (capc)

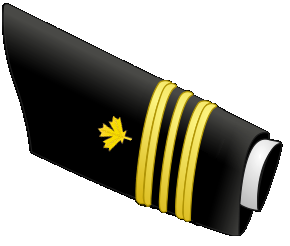

Lieutenant (Lt) / lieutenant de vaisseau (ltv)

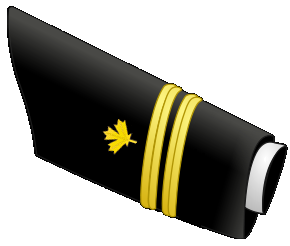

Sub-Lieutenant (SLt) / Enseigne de vaisseau de 1^{re} classe (ens 1)

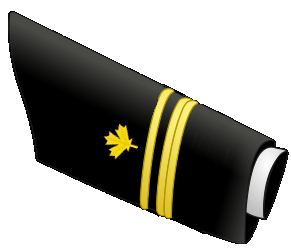

Acting Sub-Lieutenant (A/SLt) / Enseigne de vaisseau de 2^{e} classe (ens 2)

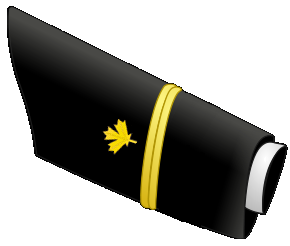

Midshipman (Mid) / aspirant (asp)

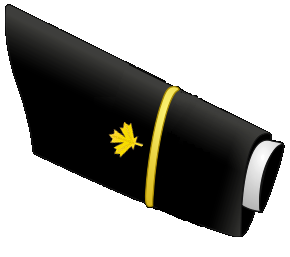

== Memorial ==
At the Royal Military College of Canada, outside Currie Hall, in the Currie Building in Kingston, Ontario, two stained glass windows relate to the history of the Royal Canadian Sea Cadets, Navy League Cadets and Navy League Wrenettes.

- Donated as a tribute to all national presidents of the Navy League of Canada for the proven love of country in promoting patriotism... seapower ... youth training, the window bestows 'Honour and Glory to patriotic citizens who have and will serve Canada.' The window features images of the Royal Canadian Sea Cadets, Navy League Cadets and Navy League Wrenettes.
- In memory of David H. Gibson, C.B.E., National President, Navy League of Canada, 1938-1952, a stained glass window features images of a young sailor and God behind the ships' wheel. The window is dedicated to Canadians who in defence of the country went down to the sea in ships. The window includes a poem by H.R. Gillarm: "Proudly in ships they sailed to sea. Ahead their goal, perhaps eternity. But with God as their pilot they had no fear facing all danger as their course was clear. Their cargo? The record of their life. Some good, some bad, some peace, some strife."
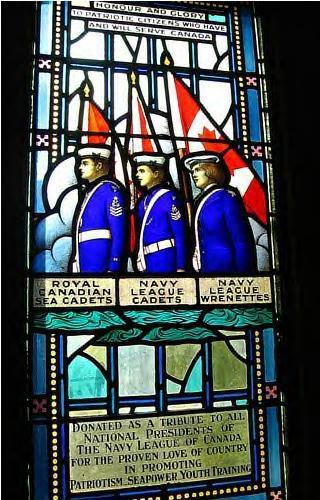
Navy League Cadet Corps Memorial Stained Glass Window, Currie Hall, Currie Building, Royal Military College of Canada

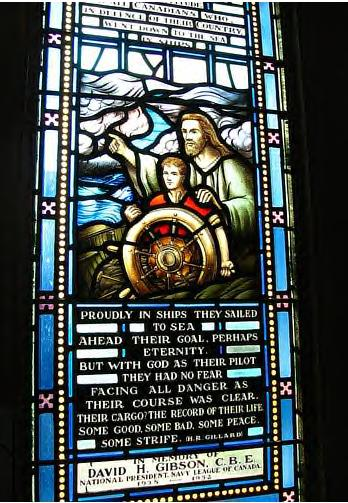
David H. Gibson Memorial Stained Glass Window, Currie Hall, Currie Building, Royal Military College of Canada

== See also ==
- International Sea Cadet Association
- Navy League Wrennette Corps, the girls' organisation (1950–1997)
