= Emily Warren (artist) =

Canadian painter (1869–1956)

- Born: Emily Mary Bibbens; November 22, 1869; Exeter, Devon, United Kingdom
- Died: June 28, 1956 (aged 86); Dunrobin, Ontario, Canada
- Known for: painter

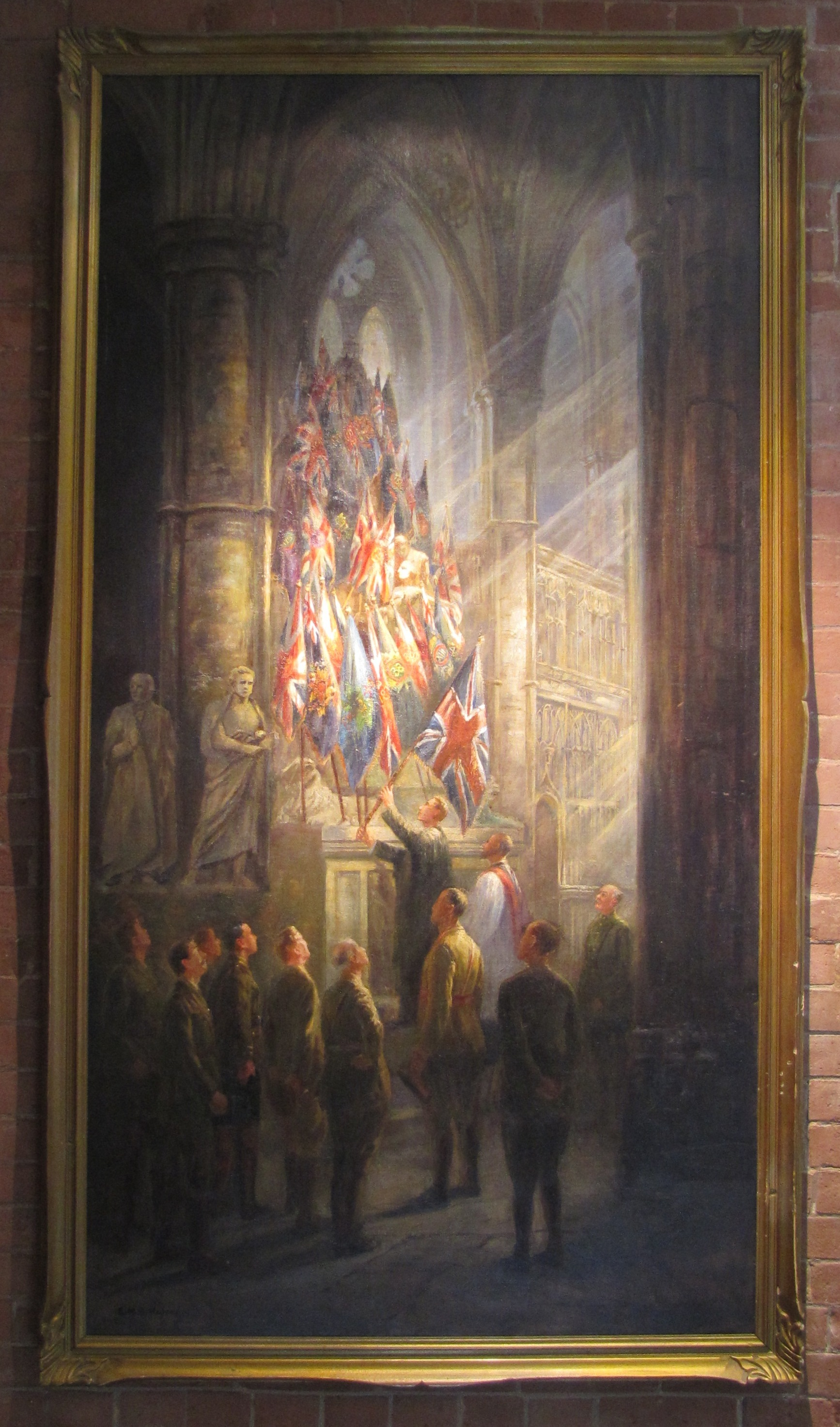
Placing the Canadian Colours on Wolfe's Monument in Westminster Abbey c. 1919, oil painting in Officer Mess, Cartier Square Drill Hall, Ottawa

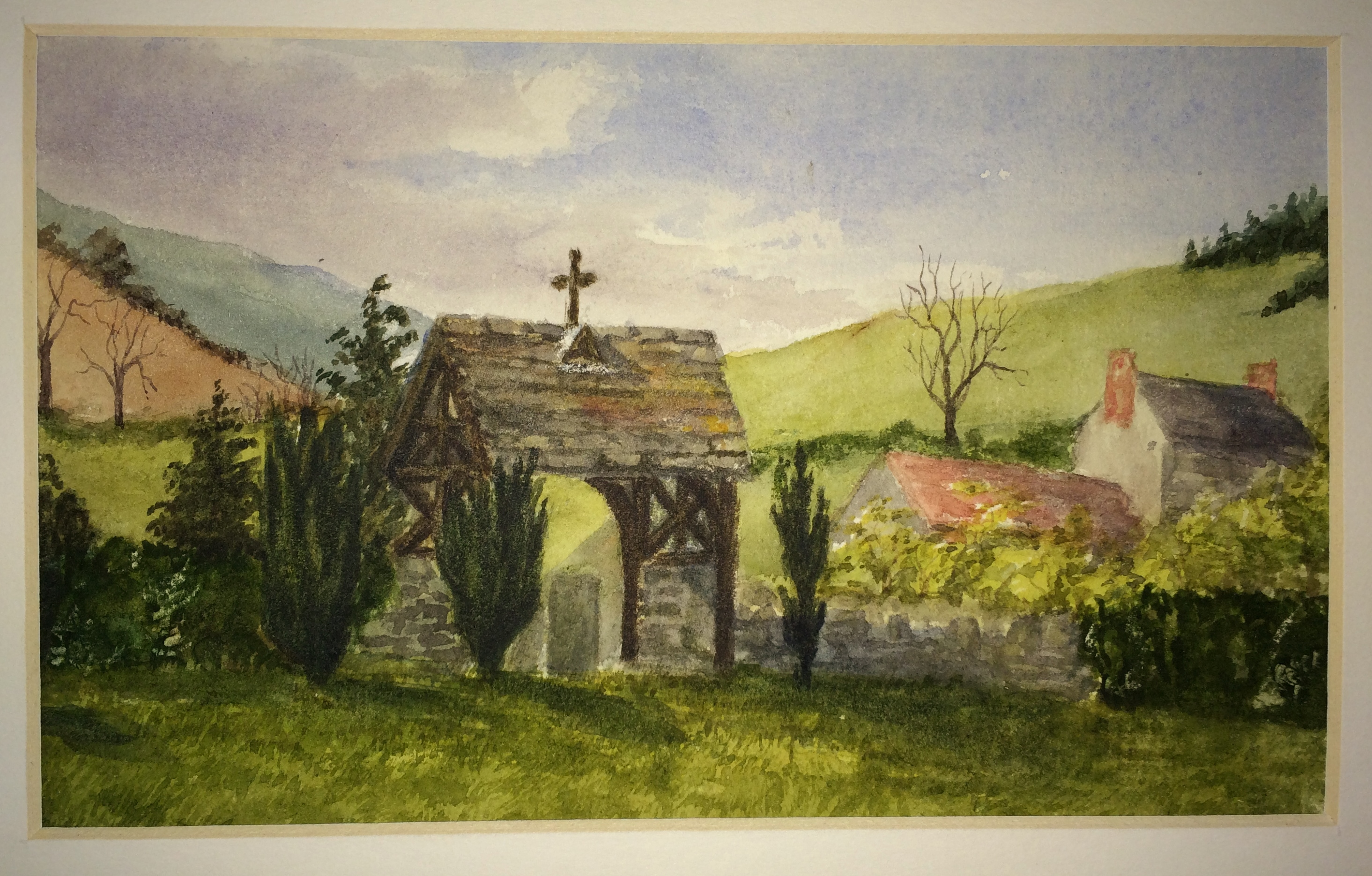
1883 watercolor by Emily Warren. It is inscribed on the back "Lych Gate The Deserted Village" E.M.B. and includes four handwritten lines from the poem. This appears to be the earliest known example of her work; created when she was just 14 years old.

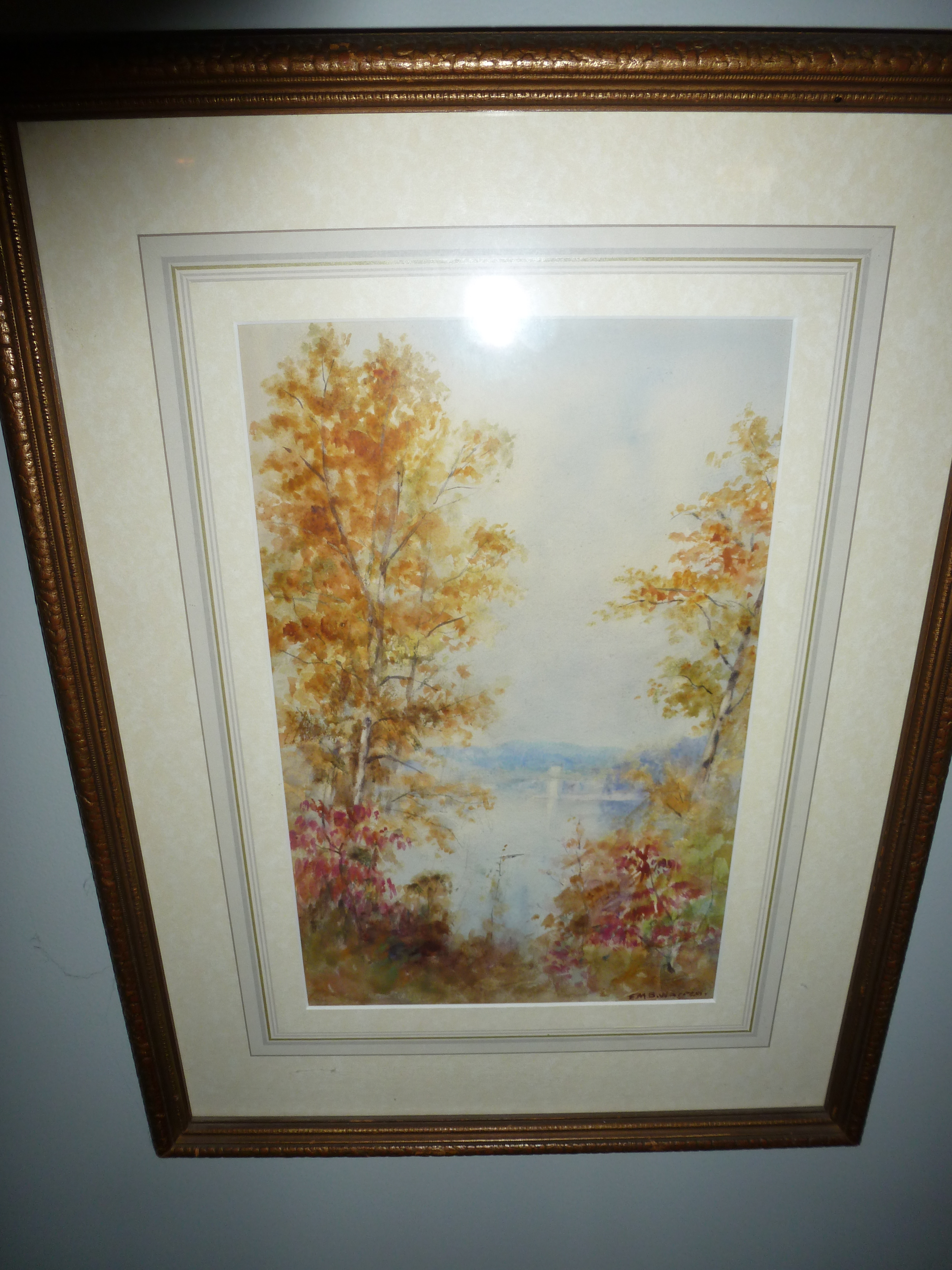
Lakeview through the Trees (watercolor)

Emily Mary Bibbens Warren (1869 – 1956) was a British Canadian artist and illustrator. She worked in ink, watercolour, oil, gouache, and graphite. Her favourite subjects included gardens, landscape, and interiors and exteriors of buildings. She is known for sunlight beaming through stained glass windows.

== Early career ==
Emily Warren instigated a successful movement to have John Ruskin's home, Brantwood, made into a museum. She lectured before Ruskin Societies.

She took a course in architecture by Sir Bannister Fletcher. She graduated from the Royal College of Art, South Kensington in 1887 at the age of 18. In 1897 she received her Art Masters Certificate from that same college. She took certificates in biology, botany and geology. She moved to Canada in 1919 and lived in Ottawa, Ontario. She lived in Montreal, Quebec from 1928 to 1934. She died in Dunrobin, Ontario in 1956.

== Memberships ==
She was a member of the Royal Society of British Artists, the Royal Watercolour Society, the Old Dudley Arts Society, the Aberdeen Society of Arts and the Society of Women Artists. She was a member of the Committee for Preservation of Memorials in London.

== Critical success ==
National Gallery of Canada purchased her oil painting Placing the Canadian Colours on Wolfe's Monument in Westminster Abbey, an oil 19 × 37". In 1921 she was commissioned by Sir Robert Borden to come to Canada to complete two large canvasses 6'6" × 11'6", oil painting entitled Canada's Tribute, The Great War 1914–1919 and Placing the Canadian Colours on Wolfe's Monument in Westminster Abbey. The Canada Tribute paintings were initially hung in the Parliament Buildings but have been hung in the Sir Arthur Currie Memorial Hall of the Royal Military College of Canada in Kingston, Ontario since 1947.

== Final years ==
She travelled and painted in British Columbia, Belgium, Scotland and France. She exhibited in England. She illustrated Homes and Haunts of John Ruskin by E.T. Cook. She gave lectures in Canada in the 1920s and 1930s illustrated by 1900 handcoloured glass slides reproducing her own paintings. Half of the 1900 slides are in the Thomas Fisher Rare Book Library, University of Toronto, along with an extensive collection of correspondence, lecture notes, and biographical material. Two boxes of slides of drawings of individual generals' faces and of flags, preliminary drawings for her paintings, Canada's Tribute and Placing the Canadian Colours on Wolfe's Monument in Westminster Abbey, are in the Canadian War Museum, Ottawa.

She held an annual sale of watercolours in Ottawa. There was a demand for her paintings of Canada, England and the continent of Europe.

== Illustrations for books ==
- E.T. Cook Homes and Haunts of John Ruskin

== Work ==
- Deserted Village, signed 'E.M.B.', watercolour, dated May 1883, with handwritten poem on back 4.5 × 7.5 in
- Quai Rosaire, Brughes, watercolour, signed, 10.5 × 7 in, 26.7 × 17.8 cm
- Autumn Day, watercolour, signed, 12 × 9 in, 30.5 × 22.9 cm
- Autumn Glory, Meech Lake, Gatineau, watercolour, signed, 6.4 × 10 in
- Barges before the Houses of Parliament, pencil and watercolour, signed 10¼ × 15¾in (26 × 40 cm.)
- Dover Castle, signed 'E.M.B. Warren', watercolour, 13 × 9 inches
- Fall Lake View, signed 'E.M.B. Warren', watercolour, 6¾" × 10¼"
- Garden scene with abundant floral bloom, watercolour, 11½" × 8",
- Manitoulin island, watercolour, signed
- Ottawa Parliament Buildings, watercolour, signed, 7" × 10"
- Sun Breaking Through the Clouds, watercolour, signed, 27 cm × 37 cm
- Thatched cottage at Portlock Weir, watercolour, signed, 7.5"x10",
- The Colonne, De, Congress Brussels. 4" × 2", watercolour
- The Statue of Sir Hans Sloane in the Physic Garden, from a watercolour drawing by E. M. B. Warren From: 'Description of the plates', Survey of London: volume 2: Chelsea, pt I (1909), pp. VIII-XI.
- Canadian Hall Interior, watercolour, 7.5" × 5.5" ? 19.1 × 14 cm.
- The nave of St Paul's Cathedral, watercolour, 25¾x18¾ in, 65.024×47.244 cm
- Canada's Tribute, signed 'E.M.B. Warren', at Royal Military College of Canada
- Canada's Tribute, signed 'E.M.B. Warren', at Officer's Mess, Cartier Square Drill Hall

== Museums ==
Her work is in the collections of the National Arts Centre in Ottawa, Ontario, the Royal Military College of Canada, Kingston, Ontario, and the Women's Art Museum of Canada in Edmonton, Alberta.

== Recognition ==
In 1939 the Royal Society of British Artists made her an R.B.A.
