= Currie Hall =

Hall at the Royal Military College of Canada

Coordinates: 44.23030°N 76.46790°W

Currie Building
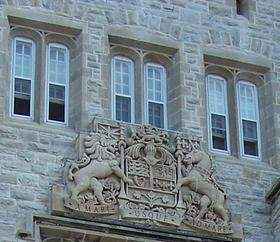
- Coat of arms of Canada on Currie Hall Mackenzie Building Royal Military College of Canada
- Interactive map of Currie Building
- Type: University Hall
- Location: Kingston, Ontario, Ontario, Canada

History
- Established: 1922
- Built: 1922

Site notes
- Architect: Percy Erskine Nobbs
- Architectural style: Gothic Revival
- Website: Official website

National Historic Site of Canada

Currie Hall is a hall within the Currie Building, which is an annex to the Mackenzie Building at the Royal Military College of Canada in Kingston, Ontario. It was built in 1922, and is a Recognized Federal Heritage Building.

The hall was designed by Percy Erskine Nobbs and built just after the end of the First World War by Sir Archibald Cameron Macdonell while he was commandant of the Royal Military College of Canada. It was built as a memorial to the Canadian Corps of the Canadian Expeditionary Force. It plays a prominent role in the life of the University. During special events, invited speakers and dignitaries may address the university population or general public from the Great Hall. Many conferences held in Kingston, Ontario may book the halls for lectures or presentations.

The Currie building also houses the Language Centre, administrative offices and Otter Squadron - University Training Plan Non Commissioned Members (UTNCM). The building was named in honour of Lieutenant-General Sir Arthur Currie, who is a National Historic Person of Canada.

Currie Hall is decorated with the crests and battle colours of every unit that fought in France during World War I.

== History ==
At the official opening of Currie Hall at Royal Military College on 17 May 1922, General Sir Arthur Currie remarked:

I cannot tell you how utterly embarrassed and yet how inexpressibly proud I am to witness this ceremony, and to be present when this hall is officially opened. This hall is to commemorate the deeds of our fellow comrades whom it was my great honour and privilege to command during the latter years of the War. It is a pleasure to look around and see the crests and battle colours of every unit that fought in France; and they remind me of the supreme effort of Canada, and they tell something of how Canada responded to the call to arms.

Under the supervision of Eleanor Milne, then Official Sculptor of Canada (1962–93), Maurice Joanisse, then an apprentice carver, sculpted the Royal Coat of Arms of Canada and Canada's motto, Ad mare usque ad mare (English: From Sea to Sea; French: D'un ocean à l'autre), over the main entrance to the building. Joanisse also sculpted the arms of Sir Archibald Cameron Macdonell and General Currie over the main entrance. Joanisse later served as Official Sculptor of Canada 1993 to 2006.

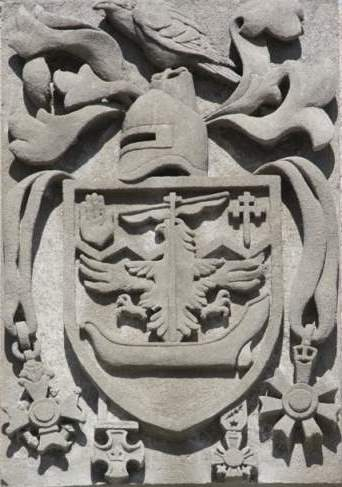
Lt General Sir Archibald Cameron Macdonell's arms

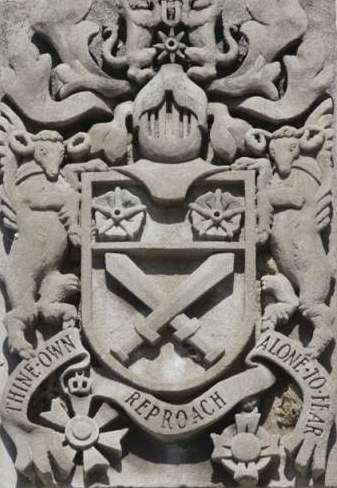
General Sir Arthur William Currie's

== Decorations ==
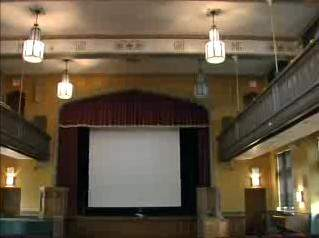
Currie Hall, Currie Building, Royal Military College of Canada

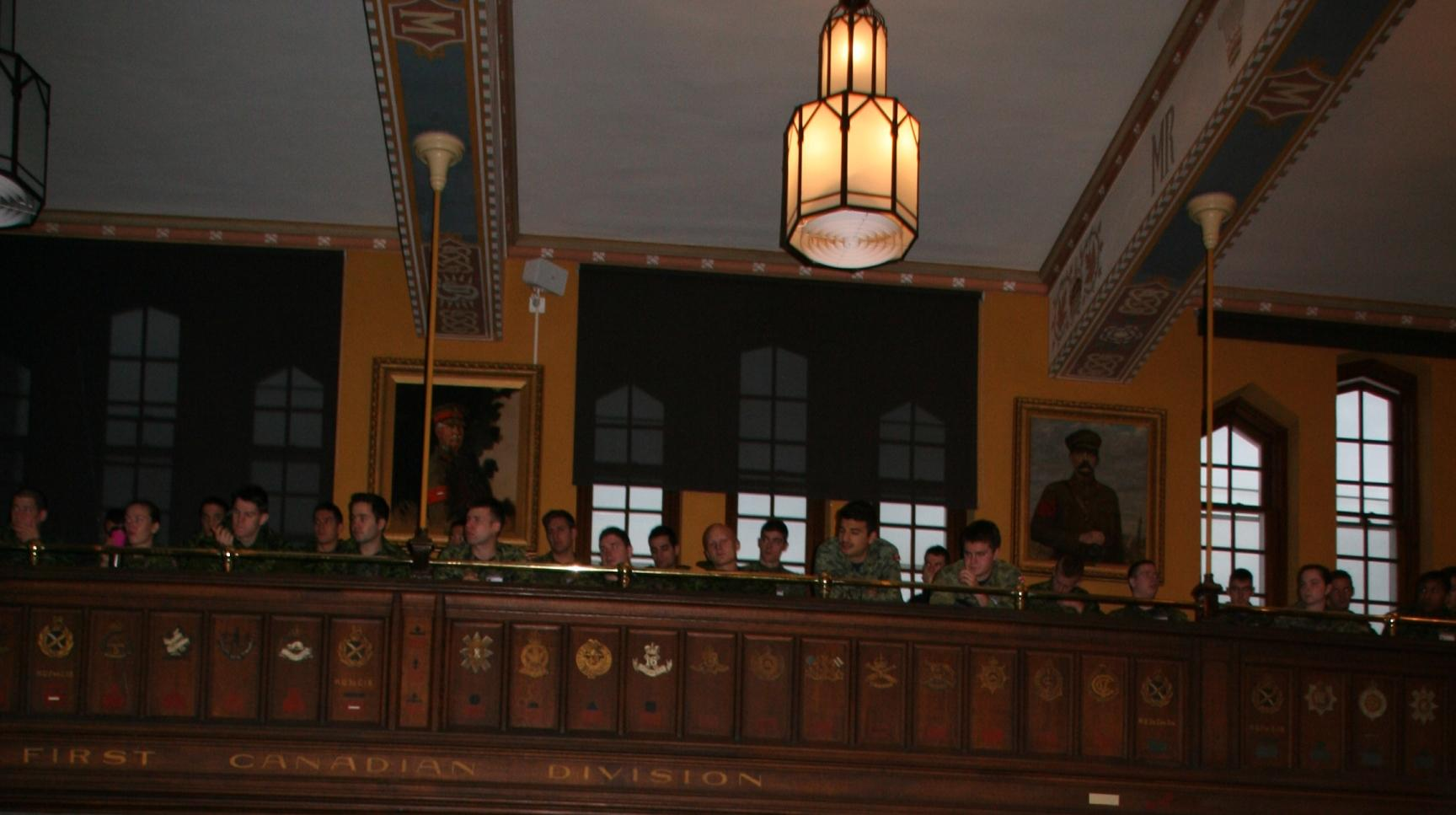
Currie Hall, Currie Building, Royal Military College of Canada

Major Stuart Forbes offered to paint the insignia as a gift to the College. General Macdonnell said that "no greater incentive or inspiration could be given to the Gentlemen Cadets of the Royal Military College of Canada than the sight of the emblems worn by the Canadian Corps."

His Excellency John Ralston Saul (February 2004) described the Currie Hall decorations,

This is an astonishing hall in which to speak. If you gaze up at the initials on the ceiling and at the paintings and the painted insignia around the walls, you are reminded that Canada is not a new country. [...] Militarily speaking, we have been at it for a long time. This hall is a conceptualisation of our participation in the First World War. All of that grandeur and tragedy is pulled together here in a remarkable way. I'm not sure that we could reproduce a hall of this sort to describe our military experiences of the last half century."

The initials of Canada Corps commanders General Sir Arthur Currie; Sir Edwin Alderson (1915–1916), and Sir Julian Byng, 1st Viscount Byng of Vimy (1916–1917), are emblazoned on the ceiling of Currie Hall as are the initials of Sir Henry Edward Burstall, Garnet Hughes, General Macdonell, Louis Lipsett, Frederick Oscar Warren Loomis, Malcolm Mercer, Sam Steele, Richard Turner, and David Watson.

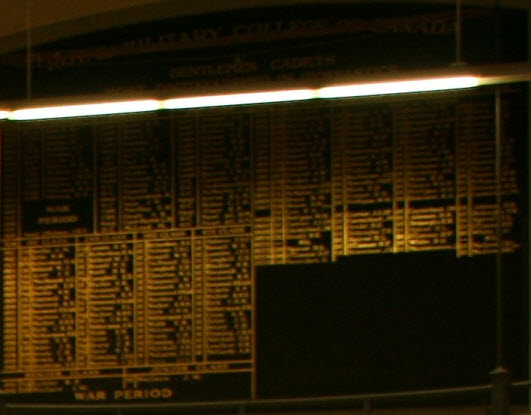
Royal Military College of Canada Gentlemen cadets Roll of Honour, Currie Hall, Currie Building, Royal Military College of Canada 2011

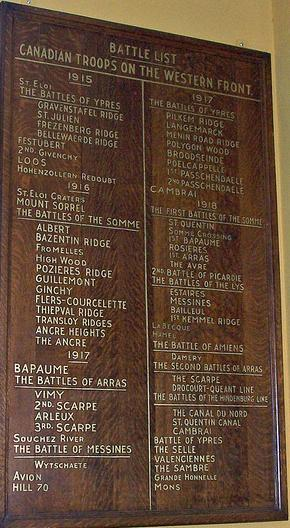
Battle list Canadian Troops on the Western Front plaque in Currie Hall, Royal Military College of Canada

The badges and battle patches belonging to the units of the 1st, 2nd, 3rd, 4th, and 5th Canadian Divisions of the Canada Corps and the cavalry brigade adorn 132 oak panels on the face of the gallery.

== Coats of arms ==
Coat of arms of Paris

Nineteen coats of arms tell the story of Canada's experience during the First World War. The first four brigades of the Canada Corps trained in Valcartier and Quebec City. The Corps landed in Devonport, Devon, in Plymouth Sound. After spending the winter on the Salisbury Plain, they crossed to France. Major battles fought by the corps were the following: Battle of Mount Sorrel; Battle of Flers-Courcelette; Battle of Morval; Battle of Thiepval; Battle of Le Transloy; Battle of the Ancre Heights; Battle of Vimy Ridge; Battle of Arleux; Third Battle of the Scarpe; Battle of Hill 70; Second Battle of Passchendaele; Battle of Cambrai (1917); Battle of Amiens; Second Battle of the Somme; Battle of the Canal du Nord (including the capture of Bourlon Wood); Battle of Cambrai: October 8–9 (including the Capture of Cambrai).

== Provincial Shields ==
Edwin Tappan Adney, who had served as engineering officer at the Royal Military College of Canada 1916-1919, created a set of three-dimensional shields of the Canadian provinces that adorn Currie Hall.

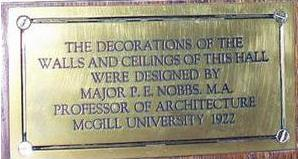
Major Percy Erskine Nobbs plaque

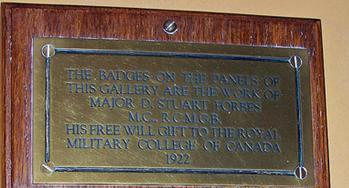
Maj Stuart Forbes plaque

== Artwork ==
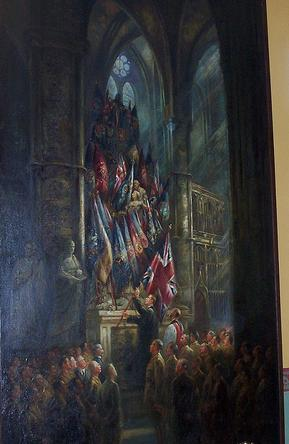
Painting Canada's Tribute, The Great War 1914–1919 by Emily Warren

In 1947, Emily Warren's two large, 6.5 ft × 11.5 ft (2.0 m × 3.5 m), canvasses entitled Canada's Tribute, The Great War 1914–1919 and Placing the Canadian Colours on Wolf's Monument in Westminster Abbey. Canada's Tribute was hung in the Currie Memorial Hall at RMC. The paintings depict the 52 sets of colours, standards and guidons being placed for safekeeping on the Wolfe Monument in Westminster Abbey. The paintings were initially hung in the Canadian Parliament Buildings. In 2010, thirty one paintings of Canadian war memorials by F.A. (Tex) Dawson were unveiled outside Currie Hall.

== Memorial staircase ==
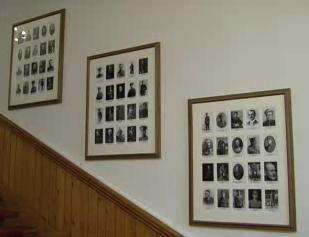
Memorial stairwell, Mackenzie Building, Royal Military College of Canada

As you enter the Mackenzie Building, which is connected to the Currie Building, you immediately see a staircase which was designated the memorial stairway after the First World War by RMC Cadet #151 Sir Archibald Cameron Macdonell, RMC Commandant 1919-1925. The staircase is decorated with the photographs of 358 alumni including Captain Nichola Goddard who had died in military service.

== Memorial and Commemorative Stained Glass windows ==
Outside Currie Hall, stained glass windows feature images of the Royal Canadian Sea Cadets, Navy League Cadet Corps (Canada) and Navy League Wrennette Corp. In memory of David H. Gibson, C.B.E. National President, Navy League of Canada, 1938-1952 a stained glass window features images of a young sailor and God behind the ships' wheel. The window is dedicated to Canadians who in defence of the country went down to the sea in ships. The window includes a poem by H.R. Gillarm:

Proudly in ships they sailed to sea
Ahead their goal, perhaps eternity
But with God as their pilot they had no fear
Facing all danger as their course was clear
Their cargo? The record of their life
Some good, some bad, some peace, some strife.

Outside Currie Hall, on the first floor, two stained glass windows feature images of a military saint holding a staff and a shield and a military saint with a horse and three angels. The subject of the middle window is Truth Duty Valour, Royal Military College of Canada with the College shield and armour.

Stained glass at Currie Hall
Location	Date	Description	Manufacturer	Inscription	Window
Sir Arthur Currie Hall	1973	1 light Oak tree and crest	Robert McCausland Limited	honours Class of 1958	
Sir Arthur Currie Hall	1970	1 light Royal Canadian Dragoons	Robert McCausland Limited	honours 2770 LCol KL Jefferson	
Sir Arthur Currie Hall	1967	1 light Antique window navy league	Robert McCausland Limited	* In memory of David H. Gibson, C.B.E. National President, Navy League of Canada, 1938-1952	
Sir Arthur Currie Hall	1967	1 light Coronation flag and crest	Robert McCausland Limited		
Sir Arthur Currie Hall	1973	1 light Royal Canadian Engineers Crest	Robert McCausland Limited		
Sir Arthur Currie Hall	1966	1 light Royal Horse Guards and family crest	Robert McCausland Limited		
Sir Arthur Currie Hall	1967	1 light Antique window	Robert McCausland Limited	* Navy League Cadet Corps (Canada) Navy League Wrennette Corp Navy League Cadet Corps (Canada) Royal Canadian Sea Cadets	Navy League Cadet Corps (Canada), Memorial Stained Glass Window, Currie Hall, Currie Building, Royal Military College of Canada
Sir Arthur Currie Hall	1968	1 light Royal Canadian Horse Artillery Crest	Robert McCausland Limited	* In memory of Colonel Edward Geoffrey Brooks DSO OBE CD 1918-1964 staff adjutant 1948-1950 by classes of 1948-52	
Sir Arthur Currie Hall	1968	1 light Dieppe Dawn	Robert McCausland Limited	* In memory of Dieppe Dawn 19 August 1942 by classes of 1948-52	
Mackenzie Building Memorial Stairway (outside Currie Hall)	c. 1920	1 light St Michael		*Gentleman Cadet James Wylie Logie (drowned 1913); window donated by his father Hon. James Wylie (1789–1854) and his mother Mary Wylie née Hamilton.	
Mackenzie Building Memorial Stairway (outside Currie Hall)	1920	1 light Emblem Royal Military College of Canada crest & motto	Robert McCausland Limited	Gentleman Cadet Douglas Burr Plumb, (drowned 1903); window donated by his stepfather Wallace Nesbitt [(1858–1930)	|-
Mackenzie Building Memorial Stairway (outside Currie Hall)	1920	1 light Antique window Sir Galahad		*Gentleman Cadet Arthur Latrobe Smith, (drowned 1913); window donated by mother and brother	
