= Navy League Wrennette Corps =

- Active: 1950–1997
- Country: Canada
- Type: Youth Organization
- Part of: Navy League of Canada
- Headquarters: Ottawa, Ontario, Canada

The Navy League Wrennette Corps was formed by the Navy League of Canada in 1950 as a cadet organisation for girls to complement the Navy League Cadet Corps of Canada.

It had similar objectives to the boys' organisation, and taught girls seamanship. As can be seen from the quotation below, boys and girls are now treated equally. The old Wrennettes organisation is now a part of the Navy League Cadet Corps:

The term "Cadet" is used to refer to both male and female cadets. The term Wrennette is no longer used for female cadets except in a historical sense. The term Cadet is not meant to be gender specific.

== History ==
1943 - The first (unsanctioned) Wrenette Corps are formed at the Royal Canadian Cadet Sea HMCS Rainbow Corp in Victoria, British Columbia.

1950 - Official Formation of the Wrenettes

1963 - Renamed as the "Jennie Bell Wrenette Corp"

1975 - Girls were permitted to become sea cadets (as well as army and air cadets)

September 1997 - Last Navy League Wrenette Corps, NLWC CENTENNIAL, is merged into Navy League Cadet Corps JRK MILLEN. - Winnipeg, MB

== NLWC CENTENNIAL, the last NLWC in Canada ==
By 1996, NLWC CENTENNIAL in Winnipeg, MB was the very last NLWC left in Canada. The decision was made to amalgamate NLWC CENTENNIAL with NLCC JRK MILLEN, who was at the time, all male. In June 1997 the last annual inspection was held, with Lt(NL) Sandi Van De Vorst as the CO, Lt(NL) Lori Armitage as the XO, and CPO1 Sapphire Kozak as the Coxswain. 30 August 97, the last summer parade was held in Morden, MB and effective 1 September 97 all NLWC CENTENNIAL, became a member of NLCC JRK MILLEN.

== Memorials ==
At the Royal Military College of Canada, outside Currie Hall in Kingston, Ontario stained glass windows relate to the history of the Navy League Wrennett Corp.

- Donated as a tribute to all national presidents of the Navy League of Canada for the proven love of country in promoting patriotism... seapower ... youth training, the window bestows 'Honour and Glory to patriotic citizens who have and will serve Canada.' The window features images of the Royal Canadian Sea Cadets, Navy League Cadets and Navy League Wrenettes.
- In memory of David H. Gibson, C.B.E. National President, Navy League of Canada, 1938-1952 a stained glass window features images of a young sailor and God behind the ships' wheel. The window is dedicated to Canadians who in defence of the country went down to the sea in ships. The window includes a poem by H.R. Gillarm: "Proudly in ships they sailed to sea. Ahead their goal, perhaps eternity. But with God as their pilot they had no fear facing all danger as their course was clear. Their cargo? The record of their life. Some good, some bad, some peace, some strife."
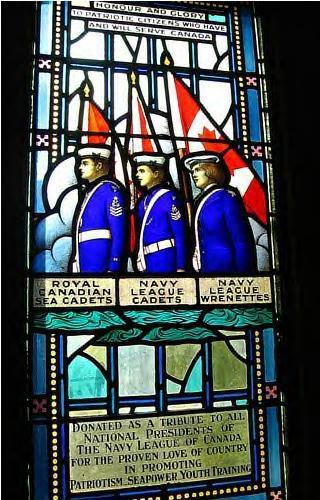
Navy League Wrennette Corp Navy League Cadet Corps (Canada) Royal Canadian Sea Cadets Memorial Stained Glass Window, Currie Hall, Currie Building, Royal Military College of Canada

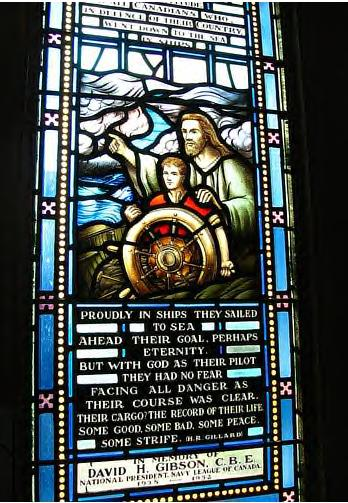
Navy League Cadet Corps (Canada), Memorial Stained Glass Window, Currie Hall, Currie Building, Royal Military College of Canada

== See also ==
- National Association of Training Corps for Girls
