= Point Frederick (Kingston, Ontario) =

Peninsula in Canada

Coordinates: 44°13′44″N 76°28′07″W

Fort Frederick Martello Tower is located in Point Frederick peninsula

Point Frederick is a 41-hectare (101-acre) peninsula in Kingston, Ontario, Canada. The peninsula is located at the south end of the Rideau Canal where Lake Ontario empties into the St. Lawrence River. Point Frederick is bounded by the Cataraqui River (Kingston Harbour) to the west, the St. Lawrence River to the south, and Navy Bay to the east. The peninsula is occupied by the Royal Military College of Canada (RMC). Several of the buildings located on Point Frederick and the site of the old naval dockyard are national historic sites. Fort Frederick, at the south end of the peninsula, is a feature of the Kingston Fortifications National Historic Site of Canada.

The peninsula was named after Frederick, Prince of Wales.

== History ==
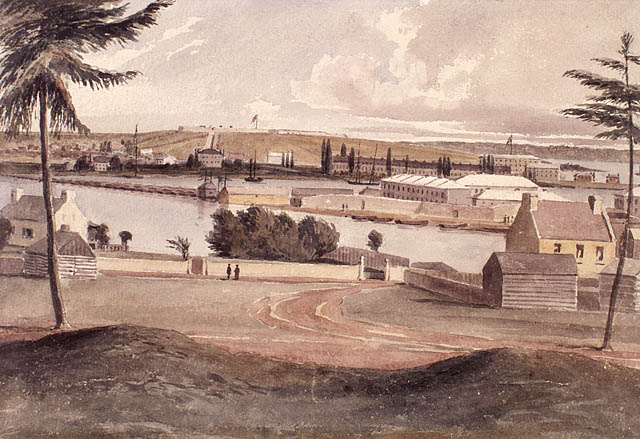
Fort Henry, Point Frederick and Tete du Pont Barracks, Kingston, from the old redoubt (1841)

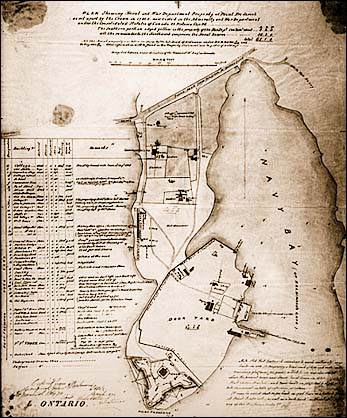
Map of Point Frederick, c. 1870

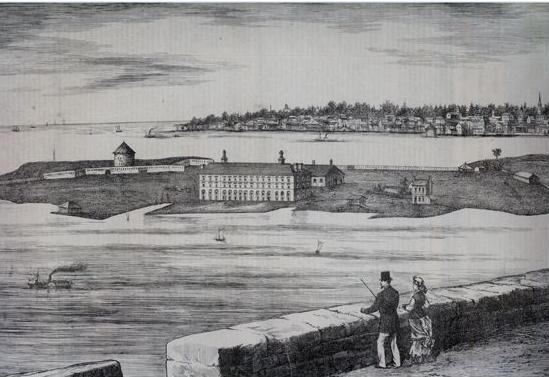
Point Frederick c 1874

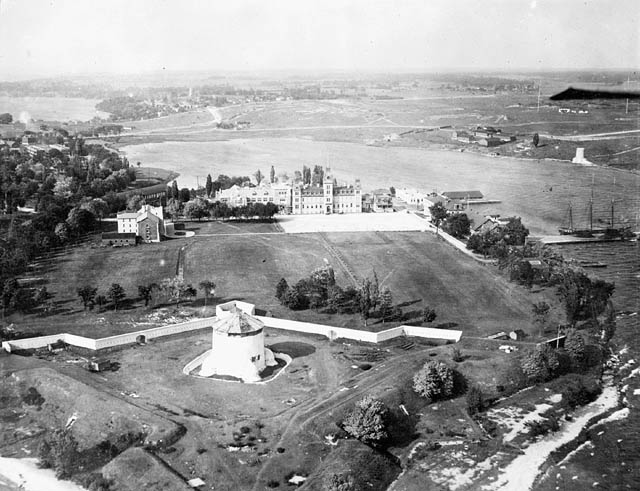
Aerial view of Point Frederick c. 1920

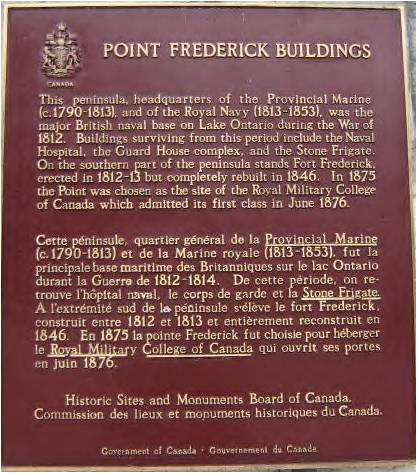
Point Frederick buildings plaque

Indigenous people lived in the area, known as "Cataraqui" for many years before European colonization. The first Europeans to settle the area were the French, who built Fort Frontenac across the river from the point in 1673. The French referred to Point Frederick as Pointe de Montreal. The area, eventually to be called Kingston, was relinquished to the British after the Seven Years' War and became a receiving centre for Loyalists fleeing from the American Revolution. The Cataraqui area was surveyed in 1783 to determine a suitable location for settlement. Governor Haldimand preferred Point Frederick rather than the area on the west side of the Cataraqui River. This plan, however, was not implemented and settlement proceeded on the west side of the river.

When the Provincial Marine relocated from Carleton Island to Kingston, Point Frederick was established as a naval depot in 1789. The peninsula was the headquarters of the Provincial Marine until 1813 and of the Royal Navy from 1813–1853. During the War of 1812 Point Frederick became a dockyard from which attacks were launched on the American bases at Sackets Harbor and Oswego.

The Point Frederick War of 1812 Commemorative Plaque, which was installed in 2013, outlines the "Strategic importance: During the entire War of 1812, Canadian, British and American land and naval forces campaigned across a vast territory from the Mississippi Valley, through the region south of Montreal, and well into the territories of the Atlantic coast. But the conflict's outcome would be determined, in particular, by events on and around the Great Lakes. For the Anglo-Canadian Forces, the St. Lawrence River and Lake Ontario was the strategic linkage for manpower and vital supplies for all inland points including the provincial capital, York, the Niagara Peninsula, and further garrisons west. Control of Lake Ontario would give crucial advantages in initiative, surprise, movement and re-supply. During the war, British naval operations on the Lake Ontario were centered here at Point Frederick, at the confluence of the St. Lawrence and Cataraqui Rivers at Lake Ontario. In 1812, the Provincial Marine operated only four vessels armed with 20 short-barreled guns. After May 1813, when the Royal Navy units under Commodore Sir James Yeo took command of the facility, it grew rapidly. At the end of 1814, the Kingston Dockyard produced the largest naval Squadron on the Great Lakes, with 1,600 personnel serving on the massive flagship St. Lawrence, on four other ships, and four smaller vessels totalling 518 guns."

With the Rebellions of 1838, the Royal Navy under command of Captain W. Sandom, RN and Royal Marines were on active service at Point Frederick; taking part in the battle of the Windmill at Prescott in 1839. Lieutenant Philip John Bainbrigge (1817–1881), a Royal Engineer posted to Canada from 1836 to 1842, painted "Fort Henry, Point Frederick and Tete du Pont Barracks, Kingston, from the old redoubt" (August 1841) showing the Naval Cottages, the Hospital, Stone Frigate, Point Henry and Fort Henry in the distance. The flag flying from atop the Stone Frigate indicates Sandom's HQ. After activities wound down in the following years, the Royal Naval Dockyard was closed in 1853.

Because of Kingston's military tradition and the fact that several military buildings already existed at the old naval dockyard, Point Frederick was chosen in 1875 as the location for Canada's first military college, the Royal Military College of Canada (RMC). The dockyard and the Stone Frigate were converted to classrooms, cadet dormitories, a kitchen and mess halls. The stores kept in the Stone Frigate were transferred to less suitable locations further from the pier. Since Point Frederick was a narrow peninsula, officer`s quarters and a fence could be built to control access, effectively isolating the grounds. The college opened in 1876. Several architecturally significant structures on the peninsula is now used by the Royal Military College of Canada. On the southern part of the peninsula, a forty-foot square blockhouse, which was erected during the winter of 1813, was demolished in the early 1840s to make way for the Martello tower, Fort Frederick, erected in 1812–13 and rebuilt in 1846. The Martello tower is now the site of the Royal Military College of Canada Museum. The fort is a component of the Kingston Fortifications National Historic Site of Canada.

In 1875, the board of governors recommended the adoption of a uniform style of architecture for the college. With a few exceptions, most notably during the depression in the 1930s, subsequent buildings were built of limestone as opposed to brick. An observatory was built in 1885. Between 1885–90, a boardwalk was built from the outer back gate to the inner gate. A rough breakwater was built on the site of the old wharf between 1885–90. Near the gymnasium, two tennis courts were constructed between 1885–1890.

Rideout Row or Hogan's Alley, consisting of sixteen small four-room cottage houses with basement kitchen facilities was built in 1909 as staff housing. The cottage houses replaced the old naval cottages near the observatory, which had been built in 1822 and were demolished in 1910. In 1909, two squash courts were built on the shore of Navy Bay to the south of the gymnasium, Panet House and the water-pumping plant.

In 1918, a temporary wooden building was erected south of the Fort Frederick dormitory for use as a naval college gymnasium and a 'quarterdeck' for divisions and evening quarters for thirty-two cadets and twenty-nine ratings who had been rendered homeless by the Halifax Explosion of 6 December 1917.

After a fire in 1931, the administration building was rebuilt by men from an unemployment relief camp under the command of the RMC Commandant and enlarged to accommodate a larger library on Barriefield lower common as a measure to deal with the depression. Camp labourers constructed a mechanical engineering building and a physics building during this period with cement blocks as opposed to conforming to the uniform architectural style based on limestone. In 1933, the boathouse was rebuilt after a fire. Camp labourers also dug the foundation for Yeo Hall, a mess and recreation building (1935–36) featuring a dining hall, kitchens and a gymnasium. The south wing of Fort Frederick dormitory, now known as Fort La Salle, was added and joined to Yeo Hall by an arch and upper passage featuring a carving of the college arms in 1935–36. In 1936, camp labourers excavated the foundations of the Fort Haldimand dormitory. When the relief camp closed in 1936, however, the digging stopped.

Before 1977, all of the sports fields on the left side of the road going into the College were part of Navy Bay. Part of this land was reclaimed from Navy Bay in 1977–1979. New playing fields on the peninsula were built on landfill reclaimed from Navy Bay.

== See also ==
- List of National Historic Sites of Canada in Kingston, Ontario
- Military history of Canada
- Royal eponyms in Canada
