= HMCS Stone Frigate =

Royal Military College of Canada building

Coordinates: 44.2295°N 76.4666°W

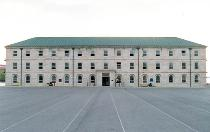
HMCS Stone Frigate, Royal Military College of Canada

HMCS Stone Frigate (Note: HMCS stands for His Majesty's Canadian Ship) is a dormitory of the Royal Military College of Canada in Kingston, Ontario. Built to be a naval storehouse, it was converted to its present use in 1876 on the establishment of the college.

== History ==
Memorial Stained Glass window, Royal Military College of Canada features HMCS Stone Frigate

The Stone Frigate was originally a storehouse at the Kingston Royal Naval Dockyard, Point Frederick Peninsula, in Kingston, Ontario. Designed by Archibald Fraser in 1819–24, it was constructed under the command of Captain Robert Barrie to store gear and rigging of the British fleet from the War of 1812 which had been dismantled and housed in Navy Bay pursuant to the Rush–Bagot Treaty of 1817.

Closed in 1835, the dockyard reopened in 1837 in response to rebellions in the Canadas. Captain Williams Sandom and a party of sailors resided in the Stone Frigate warehouse close to the St. Lawrence pier in Navy Bay. By the 1860s, only the Stone Frigate storehouse and one wharf of the dockyard were kept in repair.

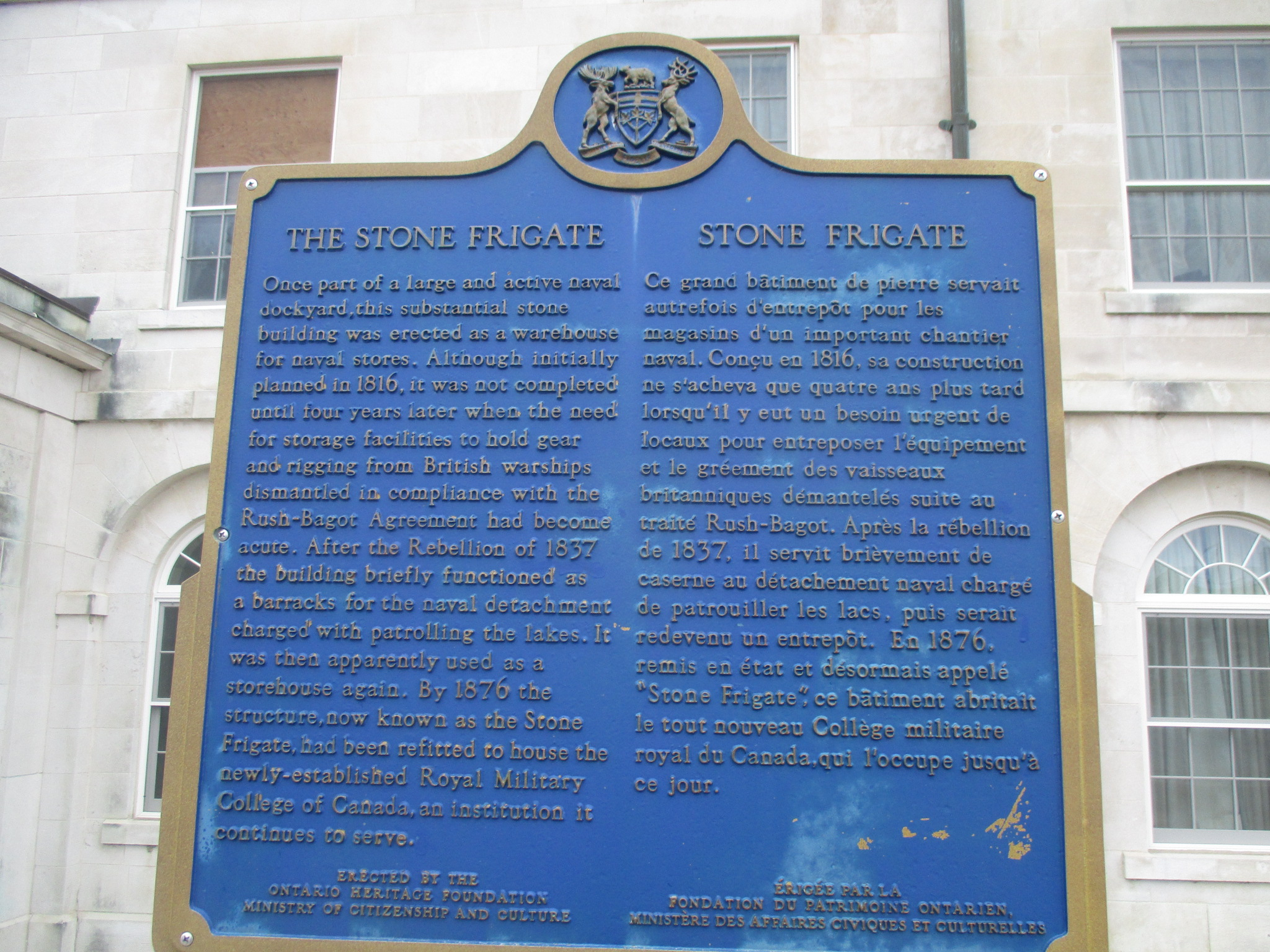
Historical plaque

The former warehouse was converted into a dormitory and classrooms when the Royal Military College of Canada was established in 1876, on the site of the former dockyard.

In 1941, the Royal Military College of Canada cadets were housed in the Stone Frigate while student officers taking Canadian junior war staff courses, field security courses and radio technician's courses were quartered in Fort Frederick.

A plaque erected in 1957 describes the Stone Frigate as follows:

Once part of a large and active naval dockyard, this substantial stone building was erected as a warehouse for naval stores. Although initially planned in 1816, it was not completed until four years later when the need for storage facilities to hold gear and rigging from British warships dismantled in compliance with the Rush–Bagot Agreement had become acute. After the Rebellion of 1837 the building briefly functioned as a barracks for the naval detachment charged with patrolling the lakes. It was then apparently used as a storehouse again. By 1876 the structure, now known as the Stone Frigate, had been refitted to house the newly established Royal Military College of Canada, an institution it continues to serve.

—

Known within Royal Military College of Canada as "The Boat", the Stone Frigate houses 1 Squadron, who in turn call themselves the Stone Frigate Military Academy. Renovations to the Stone Frigate began in the summer of 2003; some interior refinishing had taken place in the mid-1960s, however the overall interior condition of the building was poor. Interior stone walls were restored and cleaned and new structural supports and interior walls were constructed. Windows, doors, and mechanical and electrical services were installed and an annex extension was built. The Department of National Defence officially re-opened the renovated Stone Frigate building in early April 2004. The Stone Frigate is on the Registry of Historic Places of Canada.

Pipe Major Donald M. Carrigan composed the Stone Frigate Reel in honour of the Stone Frigate at the Royal Military College of Canada circa 1983.

== See also ==
- Stone frigate
- Royal Canadian Navy

== Citations ==
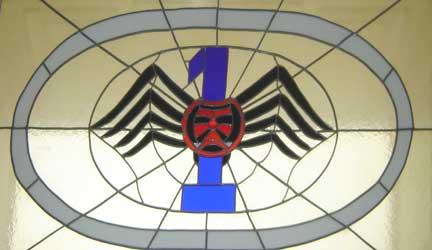
Stained glass spider window, in the Stone Frigate, 1 Squadron, Royal Military College of Canada
