= Christmas Ball (RMC) =

Annual Royal Military College of Canada event

The Royal Military College of Canada Christmas ball is an annual black tie event that occurs around the third Saturday in November in order to provide a social setting for Officer Cadets (OCdts) to practice their formal dining in skills. The event is split into two phases: a formal sit-down dinner and a more relaxed party, which allows cadets a final chance to relax before exams start.

The Christmas Ball is considered one of the premier events of the year throughout Kingston. It was ranked in Playboy's top 10 between 2003 and 2007. After a request from the school's administrators the school was removed from the list as it was "not in keeping with the university image".

== History ==
The Ball started as early as 1912 in some form as a method for training Gentleman Cadets on proper socialization with local women as well as providing "an avenue for the Gentlemen cadets to get away from the military lifestyle for a night and just enjoy being young men". By 1940 it had become "a very grand affair, held in the Gymnasium, featuring lots of red and white (the college colours) awnings decked all over the place", and has continued to grow in size and grandeur. By 2003, the Ball had become such an affair that young women from Queen's university would come to the college looking for an invitation to "one of Playboy's Top Ten parties".

== The getting of the dates ==
The most time-honoured tradition in RMC male folklore is the getting of the dates. This fairly laborious event involves mass humiliation at the hope of attracting dates from the neighboring Queen's University. Notable stunts have included running naked through Queen's painted with a phone number, using a loudspeaker in Stauffer library and walking around Queen's with a sandwich board requesting numbers.

== Dress ==
All OCdts are attired in their distinctive scarlet uniforms. Military staff wear their CF Mess Kit, and civilian men are expected to wear tuxedoes. Civilian women are expected to wear dresses that are at least knee-length, to be appropriate for a formal dinner.

== Ball events ==
The typical ball starts as with all formal Canadian Forces Mess Dinners with the piping in of the senior staff followed by the cadets and their dates. There is usually a 30-minute wait for photos to be taken and for people to find their tables. Food is served at around 20:00 and the band plays while the guests eat. At 21:00 the Commandant leads the cadets to the dance floor for formal dancing. At midnight the Commandant leaves, escorted by the senior staff, and the night goes from formal dinner to an informal party until 2am.

== Decorations ==
The Ball is typically decorated over five days and includes sleighs, reindeer, ice sculptures and decorative curtains. The aim is to transform what is ordinarily a gym into a ballroom, so all aspects of the gym are converted, from removing the equipment to covering all walls in black curtains.
