= Royal Military College of Canada =

Military college in Ontario, Canada

- Collège militaire royal du Canada (French)
- Coat of arms
- Motto: Truth, Duty, Valour; Verité, Devoir, Vaillance
- Type: Military academy
- Established: 1876; 150 years ago
- Academic affiliations: ACUFC; CMA; COU; CUSID; CVU; DRDC; ISMS; PPC; UArctic; Universities Canada
- Chancellor: David McGuinty (ex officio as Defence Minister)
- Principal: Dr. Jill Scott
- Commandant: Brigadier-General Michael Babin
- Administrative staff: 200
- Undergraduates: 1,160 full-time; 990 part-time
- Postgraduates: 300 full-time
- Location: Kingston, Ontario, Canada; 44°13′44″N 76°28′07″W
- Campus: 41-hectare peninsula east of downtown Kingston (Point Frederick); Waterfront CFB Kingston
- Language: English, French
- Call signs: VE3RMC; VE3RMC-9; VE3RMC-11
- Colours
- Nickname: RMC Paladins
- Sporting affiliations: U Sports – OUA; MAISA
- Mascot: Paladin in scarlet uniform with shield (2009)
- Website: rmc-cmr.ca
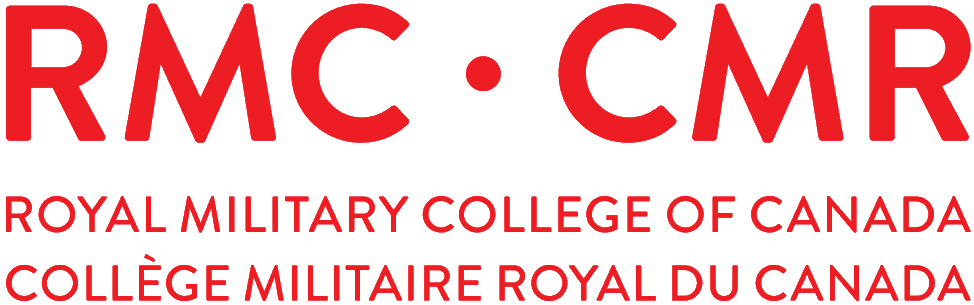

The Royal Military College of Canada (French: Collège militaire royal du Canada), abbreviated in English as RMC and in French as CMR, is a military academy and, since 1959, a degree-granting university of the Canadian Armed Forces. It was established in 1874 and conducted its first classes on June 1, 1876. Programs are offered at the undergraduate and graduate levels, both on campus as well as through the college's distance learning program via the Division of Continuing Studies.

Located on Point Frederick, a 41-hectare (101-acre) peninsula in Kingston, Ontario, the college is a mix of historic buildings and more modern academic, athletic, and dormitory facilities. RMC officer cadets are trained in what are known as the "four pillars": academics, officership, athletics, and bilingualism.

== Purpose ==
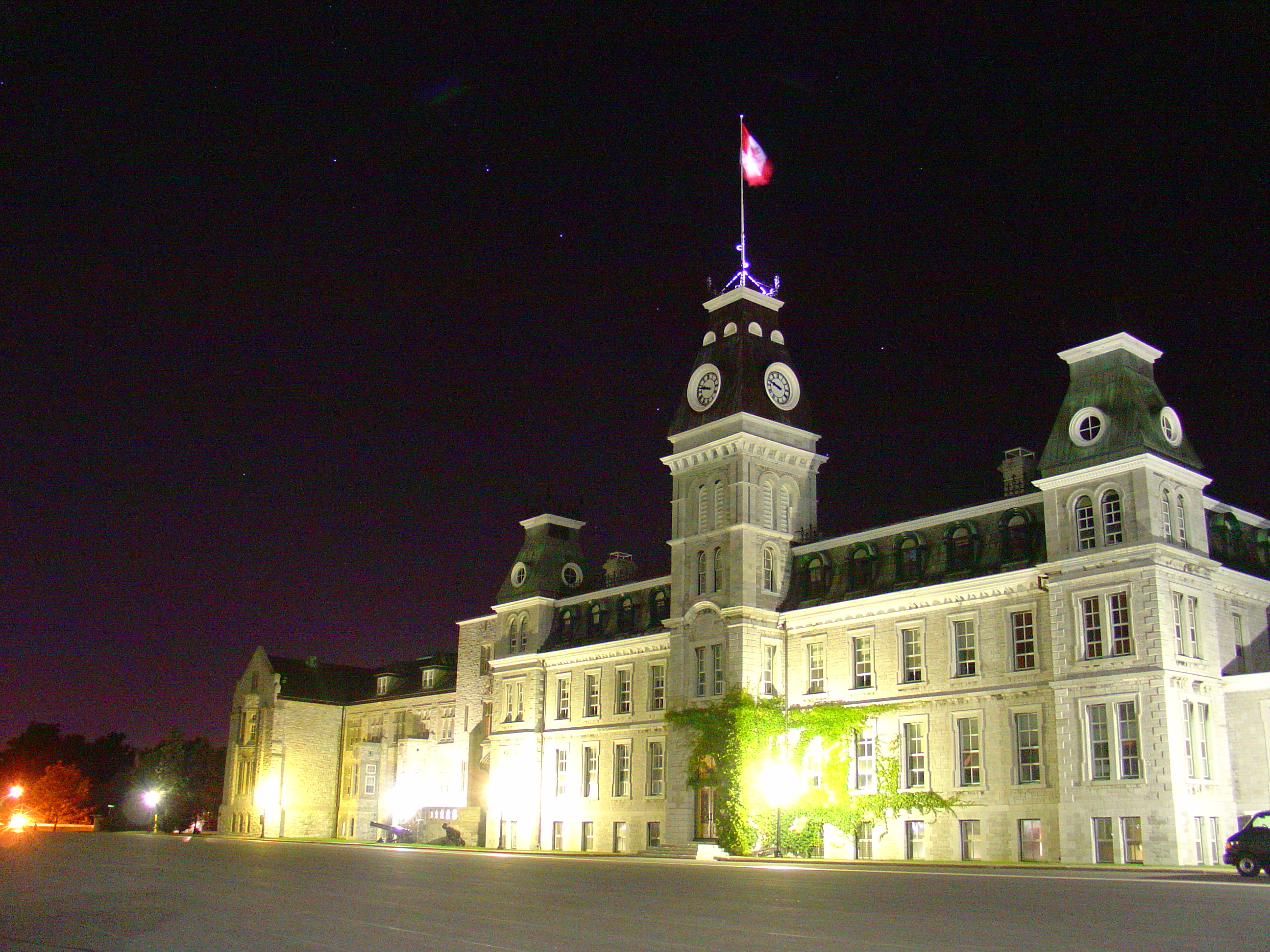
The Mackenzie Building

The Royal Military College of Canada prepares officer cadets for a long career in the profession of arms and continues the development of other Canadian Armed Forces members and civilians with an interest in defence issues. RMC provides programs and courses of higher education and professional development to meet the needs of the Canadian Armed Forces and the Department of National Defence.

RMC is responsible to:

- Provide a university education in both official languages in appropriate disciplines designed on a broad base to meet the unique needs of the Canadian Armed Forces
- Develop qualities of leadership in officer cadets
- Develop the ability to communicate in both official languages for officer cadets
- Develop a high standard of physical fitness
- Stimulate an awareness of the ethic of the military profession
- Conduct research activities in support of RMC and to meet the needs of Defence Research Agencies

The RMC priorities are:

- To build high quality, world-class programs in areas of importance to the Canadian Armed Forces and to Canada
- To promote national and international collaborations and partnerships
- To promote interdisciplinary co-operation.

== History ==
=== Early history ===
Long before the Royal Military College was established in 1876, there were proposals for military colleges in Canada. As early as 1815, the Assembly of Lower Canada decided to establish a military college, but agreement upon its organization was blocked by religious and linguistic conflicts. Subsequent attempts also proved to be abortive, although some military schools were established.

Following the withdrawal of British forces from Canada in 1870–71, the federal government recognized the need for an officer training college in Canada. In 1874, during the administration of Alexander Mackenzie, "the real founder of the college", An Act to Establish a Military College, was passed by the Parliament of Canada. The legislation provided for the establishment of a college "providing a complete education in all branches of military tactics, fortification, engineering, and general scientific knowledge in subjects connected with and necessary to thorough knowledge of the military profession" in one of the Garrison Towns of Canada".

Fort Frederick Martello Tower is located on the grounds of the RMC

The new college, named Military College of Canada, opened on June 1, 1876 in Kingston, Ontario on the grounds of Point Frederick, with 18 cadets under Lt.-Col. Edward Osborne Hewett, R.E. The names of these "Old Eighteen" are memorized by all cadets today. Entrance was by examination, and the high standards for admissions initially depressed the number of applicants. In 1878, Queen Victoria granted the college permission to use the prefix "Royal"; the college became the Royal Military College of Canada. It was the first military college to be established in a colonial dependency.

The college offered, like West Point but unlike the British service academies, a four-year course, heavily geared towards science and engineering. Uniquely among its peers, there was no expectation that its graduates would automatically become career army officers. As Canada had very limited permanent armed forces at the time, most of the cadets had to seek careers in the private sector, and many families sent their sons to the college to prepare them for civilian careers. Some received commissions in the Permanent Force or in the British Army, which agreed to offer the college's graduates four commissions every year. Many graduates who did not accept permanent military commissions continued to serve in the part-time Militia.

As a House of Commons report from 1881 put it:

The Government of the Dominion have also established, at Kingston, an institution where young men may receive a training to fit them for the military profession—an institution something on the model of West Point—the practical benefits of which, however, are not as yet appreciable in a country like this, which has no regular army, and cannot afford employment suitable for the peculiar studies necessarily followed in the Academy."

Another issue was the lack of French-speaking cadets: in the college's first 23 years of existence, there were 20 French-Canadian cadets out of 500. In the next 14 years, there were 19 out of 500. The entrance examinations were in English, which impeded recruitment.

The college experienced a period of decline in the early 1890s, until Gerald Kitson's successful term as superintendent, during which he purged ineffective staff members and reduced the length of the course to three years. His successors maintained the dual civil-military model, but put greater emphasis on the military aspect of the college's education. After 1910, all cadets were required to attend one militia camp to graduate, and to take up either a permanent or militia commission.

=== World wars ===
During the First World War, the RMC continued to operate, although the course was shortened to two years and more military instruction was added. 982 ex-cadets served in the war: they represented 86% of those who had attended the college before November 1919 who were healthy and under the age of 55. Despite being a minority of Canadian Expeditionary Force officers, RMC graduates occupied a large share of senior and staff appointments.

After the war, the RMC returned to its pre-war footing, and the course was restored to four years. During the Great Depression of the 1930s, a military-run and -styled relief camp on Barriefield lower common was set up under the command of the RMC Commandant. Extensive public works projects at the college relied on the labour of single unemployed men, the 'Royal Twenty Centres' supplied by the Unemployment Relief Commission. From 1937, academic specialization was progressively introduced in the cadet course.

In 1942, the last cadet class at RMC for the duration of hostilities graduated, a final parade was held and the college colours were laid up in St. George's Cathedral. For the remainder of the war the college served as a wartime training facility, offering courses such as the Company Commanders Course, Military Intelligence Course, and the War Staff Course. Once again, most eligible cadets fought in the war, and they were disproportionately represented in the Canadian Army's senior ranks, including all four wartime Chiefs of the General Staff.

=== 1945 to the present day ===
There were doubts as to whether the RMC would reopen after the war, and alumni mobilized to save it. In 1946, the Chesley committee, headed by Brigadier Leonard McEwan Chelsey (RMC 1917), made recommendations about the provision of officers for the active force, about the educational requirements of candidates, and about the way they should be trained. It recommended the elimination of the RMC as a cadet-training college, in favour of university-based training, followed by a period of military training at RMC. A second committee, chaired by Brigadier Sherwood Lett, recommended re-opening the RMC as a cadet college, alongside a university intake route.

Ultimately, the college was re-opened as a tri-service institution in 1948, with the "New One Hundred" cadets reporting on 20 September 1948. In 1959, it became the first military college in the British Commonwealth to achieve degree-granting status." Her Royal Highness Princess Elizabeth and the Duke of Edinburgh visited RMC on 12 October 1951.

In 1959, the province of Ontario granted a university charter to RMC by passing "The Royal Military College of Canada Degrees Act, 1959" enabling RMC to offer degrees in arts, science, and engineering at the undergraduate and graduate levels. The Royal Military College of Canada Degrees Act, 1959 was passed by the Ontario legislature and given Royal Assent on 26 March 1959. That year, the Canadian historian, Desmond Morton O.C., was the first graduate of the Royal Military College of Canada to receive a degree from the military college. Previously, cadets transferred for their final year to a civilian university, where they earned a degree.

His Excellency the Governor General presented the RMC colours in June 1961 and took the salute on the marchpast. On 26 May 1967, over 500 cadets trooped the colours on Parliament Hill in honour of the centennial of the Confederation of Canada, with the troops being reviewed by the Governor General.

In 1969, RMC became bilingual. In 1979, military colleges opened their doors to women with the admission of UTPNCM female officer cadets and post graduate students.

In 1976, RMC celebrated the centennial of its opening. The Cadet Wing paraded on Parliament Hill on 1 July in honour of that milestone.

In September 1980, the first 32 female cadets were accepted into first year at RMC. Among them was Kate Armstrong, who detailed her experience in the novel The Stone Frigate.

Year	Significance
1878	The full dress uniform of an officer cadet has remained essentially the same; however, the pillbox hat has replaced the shako. The pith helmet remains in use for parade (military) only.
1878	Private schools were established to prepare boys for entrance to RMC, including the Rothesay Netherwood School and the Hillfield Strathallan College.
1883	RMC certificates of graduation, first or second class, were replaced by RMC diplomas of graduation with or without honours. This distinguished RMC graduates from militia holders of drill certificates issued by a school of artillery.
1883–84	The first recorded first aid class taught in Ontario was held at the RMC. A plaque commemorates the 125th anniversary of the completion of the inaugural St. John Ambulance Canada first aid course conducted in Ontario. St. John Ambulance Canada first aid course plaque
1886	The first annual RMC alumni dinner was held in Ottawa; Hockey game played between students of Queen's University and the Royal Military College of Canada.
1891	The RMC Club Proceedings, the predecessor of The Review, the Log of HMS Stone Frigate, the Club Newsletter, and current Veritas was published; 194 LCol Edward Theodore Barclay Gillmore composed ‘The R.M.C. waltzes for piano [music]‘ dedicated to the Gentlemen Cadets of the Royal Military College of Canada, which was published by A. & S. Nordheimer in 1891.; 6955 A. John Bailey presented his collection of RMC Waltzes to RMC in 1965
1906	The tradition of the roll call, which continues today in the Old Brigade, began
1915	200 men undertook a seven-day, highly competitive examination for the 53 positions at the Royal Military College in the year following the outbreak of the Great War. Cadets completed an intensive wartime one-year course.; a Liver Chestnut Mare, named Collie (No. 29) came to the college in 1915, from Depot Squadron of the Royal Canadian Dragoons; the horse was destroyed and struck off strength as from 27 February 1935; the horses "gave faithful service to their country for twenty years, were seldom sick or sorry, and now are gone."
1918	A white goat named `Nan`, the mascot of the Princess of Wales' Own Regiment during the Great War, retired to the college stables from 1918 until her death on 22 September 1924, at 12 years of age. She was buried in the Cataraqui Cemetery
1919	His Royal Highness the Prince of Wales presented RMC with colours.; A bay mare named Deuce (No. 2); a brown mare named Peggy (No. 24); a brown mare named Maggie (No. 25), were transferred to R.M.C., from the Royal Canadian Dragoons, on reorganization of the Permanent Force in 1919, after previous service with that regiment; the horses were destroyed and struck off strength as from 27 February 1935 the horses "gave faithful service to their country for twenty years, were seldom sick or sorry, and now are gone."
1943	The Canadian Amateur Hockey Association declared Kingston, Ontario the birthplace of ice hockey, based on a recorded 1886 game played between students of Queen's University and the Royal Military College of Canada.
1947	Emily Warren's two large canvasses 6′6″ x 11′6″, entitled "Canada's Tribute," which were initially hung in the Parliament Buildings are hung in the Sir Arthur Currie Hall at RMC.
1948	In the post-war re-organisation of the Canadian Forces, the Canadian Military Colleges Circle (CMC) was formed with RMC, Royal Roads Military College (RRMC) and Le Collège militaire royal de Saint-Jean (CMR)
1949	The RMC Club commemorated the fallen from the Second World War on two bronze plaques located on the flanking plinths of the Arch. Names of cadets lost in Korea, through peacekeeping and other operations were added as required.
1950	The Old Brigade, alumni celebrating 50 + years since they entered one of the military colleges, are inducted. At the time, RMC was the only military college with a four-year course, the course was 15 per cent military content. He devised a new system of organization at RMC consisting of a vice-commandant as director of studies, to coordinate the military and academic training at RMC and to represent RMC at the National Conference of Canadian Universities as the equivalent of a vce-principal. The commandant personally commanded the cadet battalion. A staff-adjutant issued the routine orders.
1952	The RMC MkI submarine, which was 20 feet long with a 6-foot beam, and weighed 7200 pounds, was launched. In 2000 divers found the sub, which had been sunk in Navy Bay.
1953	The RMC Band was founded. It includes the pipes and drums section, the brass and reed section, the choir, and a Scottish highland dance troupe.
1964	In March 1964, while viewing the College Flag atop Mackenzie Building, Col the Hon. George F.G. Stanley, then Dean of Arts RMC, first suggested to Col. the Hon. J.R. Matheson, then MP for Leeds, that the RMC College Flag should form the basis of the Canadian flag. The two collaborated on a design which was ultimately approved by Parliament and by Royal Proclamation adopted as the National Flag of Canada as of 15 February 1965.
1966	The HMC Foundation of Canada – a registered Canadian charity – was founded as an alumni charitable organization to perform fundraising in support of RMC.
1976	RMC graduates its largest class to date (200 cadets).; Commemorative Centennial Canada Post stamps designed by Don McIver depict a Wing Parade in front of the Mackenzie Building and a Colour Party with the Memorial Arch in the background; Commemorative Centennial Franklin Mint Canada Ltd. silver coins depict a Gentleman Cadet holding a sword; the college's coat of arms with its motto "Truth, Duty, Valour"; the Memorial Arch erected in 1923 in memory of the Gentlemen Cadets who died in action in World War I; and Fort Frederick Tower, built in the mid-19th century, which houses the RMC Museum.; 490 Brigadier F. H. Maynard (RMC 1901) unveiled the RMC Club's centennial gift, the statue Truth Duty Valour (1976) by William McElcheran now known as ‘Brucie.’ Maynard had served in France, Mesopotamia and India.
1980	Commemorative dollar coin depicts a hockey game at Kingston Harbour in 1886: Royal Military College of Canada vs. Queen's University: International Hockey Hall of Fame
1985–present	RMC has operated SLOWPOKE reactor research facility (nominal reactor power of 20 kW) in Kingston, Ontario since 1985. A Neutron Beam Tube (NBT) was added in February 1999 to the SLOWPOKE-2 facility for radioscopy and tomography operations (2-dimensional and 3-dimensional non-destructive imaging techniques). RMC's non-power reactor operating licence was renewed and will be valid from 1 July 2013, until 30 June 2023.
1990	In June 1991, the Regimental Colour of The Royal Military College of Canada was approved. Vol. IV, p. 181.
1993	A special convocation was held to award degrees to all who graduated from RMC before it could grant degrees. 1800 Senator Hartland Molson (RMC 1924) was in attendance.
1997	RMC Board of Governors, which provides advice and recommendations to the Minister of National Defence concerning all matters related to RMC, was established.
1998	Report of the RMC Board of Governors by the Withers' Study Group – Balanced Excellence Leading Canada's Armed Forces In The New Millenium was submitted; Ministerial Approval to admit Civilian Students to RMC Postgraduate studies in War Studies, Science and Engineering 11 August 1998
2000	Canadian Defence Academy (CDA), which oversees RMC, was established; Ministerial Approval to Admit Civilian Students to the RMC Continuing Studies Program, 6 October 2000
2001	To commemorate the 125th anniversary of the founding of RMC, the RMC Foundation refurbished the Memorial Arch and the Royal Canadian Mint issued a 5-cent coin.; The Canadian War Museum exhibition "Truth, Duty, Valour: The Royal Military College of Canada, 1876–2000" celebrates the institution's 125th anniversary.; The RMC's Queen's Colour (flag) and Regimental Colour (flag) were registered with the Canadian Heraldic Authority on 1 June 2001.
2003	The RMC celebrated the 125-year history of the college with a National Film Board of Canada Documentary, The Royal Military College of Canada – A History
2006	$100 Dollar Gold Royal Canadian Mint ice hockey coins commemorate the 75th Anniversary of the longest international hockey series – Royal Military College of Canada vs West Point hockey classic; the artist was Tony Bianco.
2007	For every 2.5 undergraduate degrees, RMC now produces one graduate degree. The average civilian faculty member at RMC currently attracts over $121,000 annually in extramural research funding.
2008	The RMC launches the Aboriginal Leadership Opportunity Year (ALOY)
2010	Ministerial approval to allow RMCC to admit foreign military officers to its academic programs in order to complete one-year program combining academic studies and military training as part of the Junior Officer Training and Education Short Program 2010; RMCC launched its writer in residence program.; 31 paintings of Canadian war memorials by F.A. (Tex) Dawson were unveiled outside Currie Hall in the Mackenzie Building on 7 April 2010.
2012	The RMC launches its first Multicultural Day, promoting the culture and traditions of the Republic of Korea (ROK).; Owing to Federal Government budget cuts, approximately 40 – 50 Faculty and support staff positions will disappear at RMC & RMC St Jean between 2012 and 2015.
2013–14	Ministerial approval to allow RMCC to admit civilian students under Project Hero, a scholarship program for the children of Canadian Forces personnel killed while on active military duty.; Ministerial approval to allow RMCC to admit (up to 15) foreign military officers in its academic programs in order to complete undergraduate degree as part of the Junior Officer Training and Education Long Program 2013

== Organization ==
The RMC mission is to educate, train and develop Officer Cadets for leadership careers of effective service in the Canadian Armed Forces – the Royal Canadian Air Force, the Royal Canadian Navy and the Canadian Army.

For most students under the ROTP (Regular Officer Training Plan), education is free and a monthly salary is paid which meets incidentals. The courses are offered both on site and by distance learning in both official languages: English and French. After graduation, Officers are to serve two months of obligatory service for each subsidized month of education.

RMC offers 19 undergraduate programs in Social Sciences and Humanities, Science and Engineering. RMC offers 34 graduate studies opportunities, including 14 doctorates. In addition to the Faculty of Social Sciences and Humanities, Engineering, and Science, the Division of Continuing Studies offers undergraduate and graduate level programs including the "Officer Professional Military Education" program (OPME). The Department of Applied Military Science (AMS) offers a graduate level program – the Army Technical Staff Officer Programme (formerly Land Force Technical Staff Program (LFTSP)) and an undergraduate/community college level program – the Army Technical Warrant Officer Programme.

All undergraduate students are required to complete the core curriculum, which is designed to provide a balanced liberal arts, science, and military education. The Core Curriculum consists of Economics, Psychology, Mathematics, English, Calculus, Military history of Canada, Chemistry, Canadian History, Physics and Civics.

Faculty of Engineering	Faculty of Social Sciences and Humanities	Faculty of Science
Mechanical and Aerospace Engineering; Chemistry & Chemical Engineering; Civil Engineering; Electrical Engineering and Computer Engineering	Humanities, (English, History, or French); Social Science: Politics and Economics Military Psychology and Leadership; Military and Strategic Studies; Business Administration	Mathematics and Computer Science; Physics; Chemistry; Space Science
Applied Military Science	Faculty of Continuing Studies	
Army Technical Staff Officer Programme; Army Technical Warrant Officer Programme	Continuing Studies Division – RMC Saint-Jean; Graduate Studies and Research	

=== Centres and institutes ===
The research at RMC focusses on areas of direct and indirect benefit to the Department of National Defence; More than 90 per cent of the research at RMC is defence-related. RMC conducts both academic and contracted research on electrical and computer engineering, physics, chemistry, chemical engineering and environmental engineering, civil engineering, mechanical engineering, international security, governance and the economics of defence; some research involves the Institute for the Environment as well as nuclear research. Both members of the Canadian Forces and civilian students are eligible for admission to the master's and doctoral programs; Funding has been put in place to support both military and civilian students.

Canadian Forces Language School	Canadian Forces Leadership Institute at RMC
The Royal Language Centre of Canada teaches cadets how to communicate in both of Canada's official languages, English and French. The program begins with 4 placement tests. Students are placed into small classes and undergo 6 periods of instruction per week during regular school hours.; Founded in 1958, the Language Schools at the Collège militaire royal de Saint-Jean, Quebec, Ottawa, Ontario and Borden, Ontario is to provide language training for military personnel.	Founded in September 1999, the Canadian Forces Leadership Institute (CFLI) at RMC teaches the philosophy of leadership and command. The Institute plays a role in the development of all Canadian Forces officers and Non Commissioned Members.; The CFLI is a centre for multi-disciplinary research, analysis and lessons learned on leadership and professionalism in the armed forces and civil society. The institute's civilian and military faculty in the social sciences and humanities ensure that academic theories, models and concepts guide military doctrine and reforms and share Canadian military concepts, policies and programs with the academic community, other government departments and foreign counterparts.
Centre for International Relations at Queens	Centre for Space Research at RMC
Established in 1975, the mission is to conduct research in matters of national and international security and other aspects of international relations. The centre has strong links with the RMC.	The mission is to create an environment to promote active space research programs and thereby provide support for Space Science and other space-related degree programs and activities.
Canadian Forces Management Development School (CFMDS)	Centre for Manufacturing of Advanced Ceramics and Nanomaterials at Queens and RMC
	The mission is to support and promote research and education in the field of advanced materials and manufacturing at Queen's University and at RMC
Fuel Cell Research Centre at Queens and RMC	GeoEngineering Centre at Queens and RMC
The mission is to advance the knowledge base for addressing the key technology challenges to the commercialisation of fuel cell applications.	Founded in 2001, the GeoEngineering Centre at Queens and the RMC mission is to innovate and advance knowledge in geotechnical, geohydrological, geochemical, geomechanical and geosynthetics engineering. The centre has been housed on the first floor of Ellis Hall at Queen's University since July 2004.
High Performance Computing Virtual Laboratory	Institute for Defence Resources Management at the RMC
Led by Queen's University, the HPCVL mission is to provide supercomputer power to a number of universities in eastern Ontario: Queen's University, RMC, the University of Ottawa and Carleton University. Researchers are provided with the computational power needed to solve increasingly complex problems.	The mission is to make available the most recent and relevant research results from the study of defence economics to Canadian defence policy analysis and decision-making.
Defence and Security Research Institute (DSRI) at RMC	Canadian Institute for Military and Veteran Health Research (CIMVHR) at Queens and RMC
The Defence and Security Research Institute (DSRI) was created on 13 June 2008, at RMC. The DSRI is a defence and security centre within both the academic and defence and security science research communities. The Research Areas of Pursuit are: communications, energy, environment, materials, and security policy.	The CIMVHR was created in 2010 at RMC and Queen's. The military and Veteran health research areas of pursuit are: battlefield medicine and surgery, epidemiology, infectious disease, collaborative health care teams, health technologies, health surveillance, Veterans’ health, mental health, military and veterans’ family health, occupational health, operational health, and rehabilitation.
Centre for Security, Armed Forces and Society (CSAFS) at RMC	
^{2}The CSAFS was founded in 2006 as a think tank with offices in the Department of Politics and Economics. Political and strategic research is delivered to clients such as the CEFCOM, J2, J3 and DRDC with deliverables ranging from publication, presentations and symposiums, to briefing notes, round table discussions and conferences.	

=== Law ===
The Military Law Centre on the grounds of RMC, staffed with 12 military lawyers, oversees the education of officers and troops in legal matters ranging from the Forces' own code of conduct to the laws of war. It trains military lawyers and advises Ottawa on matters of policy and doctrine. The centre integrates legal education into the regular training that Forces members undergo and establishes its growing importance within the military hierarchy. Selected RMC Canada cadets participate in Law of Armed Conflict international Competitions each fall with cadets from USAFA, USMA, USNA, and USCGA. Each year, RMC cadets are selected to participate in a competition on the Law of Armed Conflict at the International Institute of Humanitarian Law in Sanremo, Italy.

=== Research and partnerships ===
In the Engineering and Science divisions, RMC pursues the following principal areas of research:

- information technology, communications, microelectronics,
- environment,
- energy and energy development,
- Advanced materials engineering,
- geotechnical engineering, and
- fluid mechanics and engineering.

In the Social Sciences and Humanities divisions, RMC pursues research and activities in:

- military history,
- political science and international security,
- peacekeeping and peacemaking,
- comparative government, international relations and ethical code of conduct in conflict,
- leadership, and
- economics.
- The RMC Centre for Security, Armed Forces and Society (CSAS-CESFAS) provides a focus for research conducted within the Faculty of Arts and facilitates communication between the Department of National Defence, other research institutions, scholars and Canadian civil society.

In the Department of Applied Military Science (AMS), RMC pursues:

- the Land Force Technical Staff Programme (captains & majors);
- the Technical Warrant Officer Programme (warrant officers & master warrant officers).

The Diploma in Military Arts and Sciences (DMASc) provides non-commissioned members (NCMs) of the Canadian Forces an online program made possible by a partnership between OntarioLearn, the RMC, and the Canadian Defence Academy. Under RMC and community college articulation agreements, all graduates of this diploma program who apply to the RMC will be admitted into the Bachelor of Military Arts and Sciences degree program with advanced standing.

The college is an active member of the University of the Arctic. UArctic is an international cooperative network based in the Circumpolar Arctic region, consisting of more than 200 universities, colleges, and other organizations with an interest in promoting education and research in the Arctic region.

== Admissions ==
=== Training plans ===
There are several full-time admission options for an education at RMCC.

==== Regular Officer Training Plan ====
The Regular Officer Training Plan (ROTP) is a conditional scholarship offered to selected applicants. In addition to a university education, officer cadets receive military training, occupation training and second language training and a career after graduation. The full-time salary includes full dental care, as well as vacation with full pay. Upon successful completion of ROTP, officer cadets are awarded a university degree and granted commissions as officers in the Canadian Forces. Normally, graduates serve at least five years with the Canadian Forces. The application deadline to ROTP is in January for Basic Officer Training in July and admission the following September.

Typically, successful applicants enter the Canadian Military College (CMC) System as an officer cadet, where they receive an education that balances academics, leadership, bilingualism and athletics. If the choice of program is not offered, such as Nursing, Physiotherapy and Pharmacy, or the candidate wishes to attend another university, successful applicants are eligible to apply to any Canadian university where books, lab fees and student fees are covered, and students receive a monthly salary under the Civilian University ROTP.

==== Reserve Entry Training Plan ====
The Reserve Entry Training Plan, discontinued in 2017, was an education that was the same as the ROTP but was paid for by the student (not a scholarship). The students also did not draw a salary; however, they were not obligated to five years of service after completion. Reserve Entry cadets were, however, paid considerably more than the regular ROTP officer cadet salary during their summer training months. They were also entitled to this pay if they attend "duty/varsity" away trips (For example, an away game of women's soccer).

==== Others ====
- UTPNCM: University Training Plan – Non Commissioned Members for non-commissioned members of the Canadian Forces to earn a degree and then serve as officers.
- IBDP: Initial Baccalaureate Degree Program, a baccalaureate program.
- DCS: Division of Continuing Studies, also available part-time

==== Selection process ====
Since an application to ROTP is also an application to the Canadian Military College System, all candidates are assessed against an aptitude test, a medical examination, and an interview.

Military potential is an assessment of aptitudes, personality traits, and the choice of occupation. Academic performance is rated based on a student's transcript. Unlike many universities, since a complete transcript is submitted to the selection board, grade 9-11 marks are heavily weighted in a student's application with consideration given to grade 12 (or the final year's) marks. Officer cadets are obliged to maintain satisfactory academic and military performance throughout the programme.

==== Continuing studies ====
RMC started a graduate studies program in 1965. The Division of Continuing Studies was established in 1997.

The mandate of the RMC Division of Continuing Studies is to make university education available to all members of the Canadian Forces, spouses and DND civilian employees. Canadian Forces and other professional training is recognized for credit towards undergraduate or advanced degrees.

Unique degree programs, specially tailored for CF members, include:

- Bachelor of Military Arts & Sciences,
- Master of Business Administration,
- Master of Defence Management and Policy, and
- Master of Arts and PhD in War Studies.

==== Tuition ====
Tuition fees (2022–23) at the undergraduate level vary from $3,020 – $4,140 per term for Canadian undergraduate students and $2,670 – $2,980 per term for Canadian Graduate students. The tuition fees for international students vary from $7,410 – $7,690 per term for graduate students. The lower tuition amounts are for the arts and sciences programs, while the higher amounts are for the engineering programs.

Because of commitments of military service following graduation, education is free for most on-campus undergraduates; these Officer Cadets also receive an additional monthly salary. Funding has been put in place to support civilian students, who are eligible for admission to the master's and doctoral programs to work alongside graduate students who are members of the Canadian Armed Forces.

== Cadet life ==
=== Uniforms ===
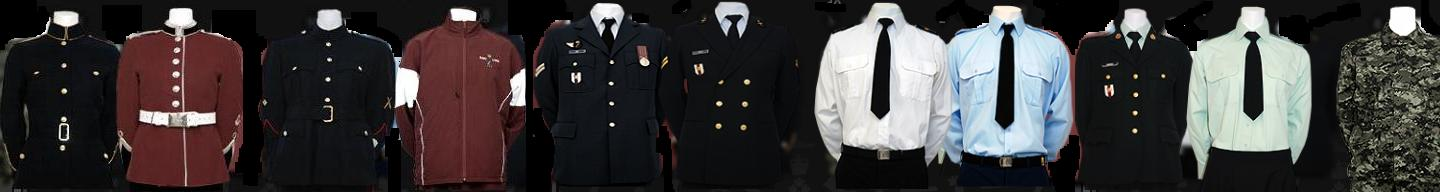
Royal Military College of Canada uniforms

Cadets wear a variety of uniforms depending on the occasion and their environment: ceremonial dress (semi ceremonial); full dress (formal occasions); outside sports dress; service dress Air Force; service dress Navy; service dress Navy without jacket; Service dress Air Force without jacket; service dress Army without jacket; and combat dress. In winter 2009, Royal Military College officer cadets returned to wearing a distinctive Dress of the Day (DOD) uniform which consists of a white shirt, black sweater/light jacket, as well as black trousers/skirt with a red stripe down the side. The headdress is a black wedge with red piping. Mess dress is worn in the Senior Staff Mess for formal occasions such as mess dinners.

=== Student life ===
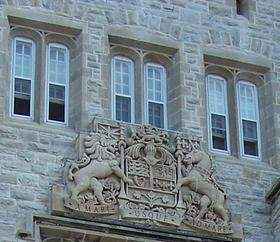
Coat of arms of Canada on Currie Hall, Mackenzie Building, Royal Military College of Canada

- The RMC Cadet Mess in Yeo Hall has facilities for social and recreational activities. Staff and faculty have access to the Senior Staff Mess.
- The Baronial Hall or Currie Hall, which was designed in 1922 by Percy Erskine Nobbs to honour the Canadian Expeditionary Force in World War I play a prominent role in the life of the university. During special events, invited speakers and dignitaries may address the university population or the general public from the Great Hall. Many conferences held in Kingston, Ontario may book the halls for lectures or presentations.
- The CANEX is a small retail store in Yeo Hall for personal articles, souvenirs, snacks and dry cleaning.

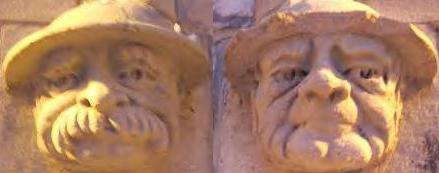
Old Bill & Alphie at Yeo Hall, Royal Military College of Canada

- Bill & Alphie's, the on-campus cadet mess in Yeo Hall, is named after Bruce Bairnsfather's Great War cartoon characters. Old Bill & little Alphie, stone carvings based on two World War I cartoon characters by Bruce Bairnsfather, appear at the entrance to RMC's Yeo Hall.
- The campus is on the shore of Lake Ontario and has easy access to two lake-front parks, favourite locations for students to relax. The campus is also located approximately 10 minutes' walk from the city's downtown.
- Cadets are obligated to perform community service. Every year there is a mandatory class project. The first year class project has cadets conduct an event for the "underprivileged" youth of the city. The second year class project has cadets conduct a food drive for the city's food bank. The third year class project has cadets perform upkeep on the city's many parks. The fourth year class project has the class project leader raise money for a charity through the conduct of a fundraiser which usually takes the form of a baseball tournament.
- The student clubs and organizations associated with the RMC include: Arts, Astronomy, Broomball, Cheerleading, Chess, Climbing, Cycling, Debating, drama, Duke of Edinburgh's Award, Expedition, Fish & Game, Flying, golf, Judo, Juggling, Taekwondo, Outdoors, Paintball, Photo, rowing, Social Dance, Stage Band, Triathlon/Running, Video Editing, War Games, Water Polo, Windsurfing, Women's Rugby and Yachting. In recent years, an Automotive Club has been added.

=== Squadrons of the Cadet Wing ===
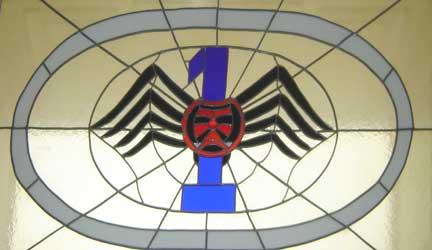
#1 squadron, stained glass spider, Stone Frigate, Royal Military College of Canada

The undergraduate student body, known as the Cadet Wing, is sub-divided into 13 (12 ROTP and 1 UTPNCM) squadrons of approximately 80 cadets each. Each squadron is subdivided into three flights, with each flight further subdivided into three sections. The squadrons are led by senior cadets under the guidance of the squadron commander.

Squadron #	Name	Year	First Year Flight	Colour	Mascot
1	Hudson	1948	Alpha Flight	Navy blue	Spider
2	La Salle	1948	Fighter Flight	Red	Gryphon
3	Pontiac	1955	Grizzly Flight	Forest green	Grizzly Bear
4	Frontenac	1948	Kaeble Flight	Sky blue	Shark
5	Brock	1950	Papa Flight	Maroon	Phoenix
6	Brant	1968	Romeo Flight	Gold	Pirate
7	Wolfe	1968	Tango Flight	Grey	Wolf
8	Mackenzie	1973	Whiskey Flight	Lime green	Bulldog
9	Verchères	1995	Warrior Flight	Orange	Tiger
10	Montcalm	1995	Merritt Flight (formerly Savage Flight)	White	Dragon
11	Cartier / Tecumseh (1996–1998)	2007	Victory Flight	Purple	Beaver
12	Fraser	2007	Hunter Flight	Brown	Deer
	Joliette	2007	Good Flight (disbanded May 2012)	Beige	Lion
	Otter	1977	Jolliet Flight (disbanded May 2012)	Black	Otter

Note: The dates given are for the current organization of the wing and does not include former squadrons or the same squadrons under different names. For example, 1 Squadron was the first squadron at RMC, meaning 1 squadron has existed since the college's founding in 1876, but has only been known as Hudson Squadron since 1948.

In 2007, a former squadron of the Royal Military College Saint-Jean, Jolliet Squadron, was stood up at RMC as 13 Squadron. The squadron was named in honour of Louis Jolliet, with its first-year flight, Good Flight, named after Herman James Good, a Victoria Cross recipient from the 13th Battalion, CEF.

=== Royal Military College of Canada Bands ===
The Massed Band, consisting of the Brass and Reed, Pipes and Drums, and Highland Dancers, perform at parades, public relation trips and recruit shows. The Brass and Reed Band is a multi-purpose section, used primarily as a parade march and concert band. The Pipe Section and the Drum Section perform at mess dinners; parades; sporting events; ceremonies (official or squadron); weddings; funerals; public relations; wing events; Christmas Ball (RMC) & Graduation Balls; private events; and holidays. The Highland Dance Section perform at many of the same functions with the exception of parades and funerals. The Choir performs the Canadian national anthem; sings at mess dinners; and accompanies the Stage Band on selected pieces including: folk, jazz, traditional music, French music, show tunes, African music and Christmas songs. The Stage Band is versatile, performing dinner music followed by marches at college mess dinners. The Cheer Band, a subsidiary of the Brass and Reed, performs music for RMC sporting events, such as the Carr-Harris Cup and the Westpoint Weekend.

=== Athletics ===
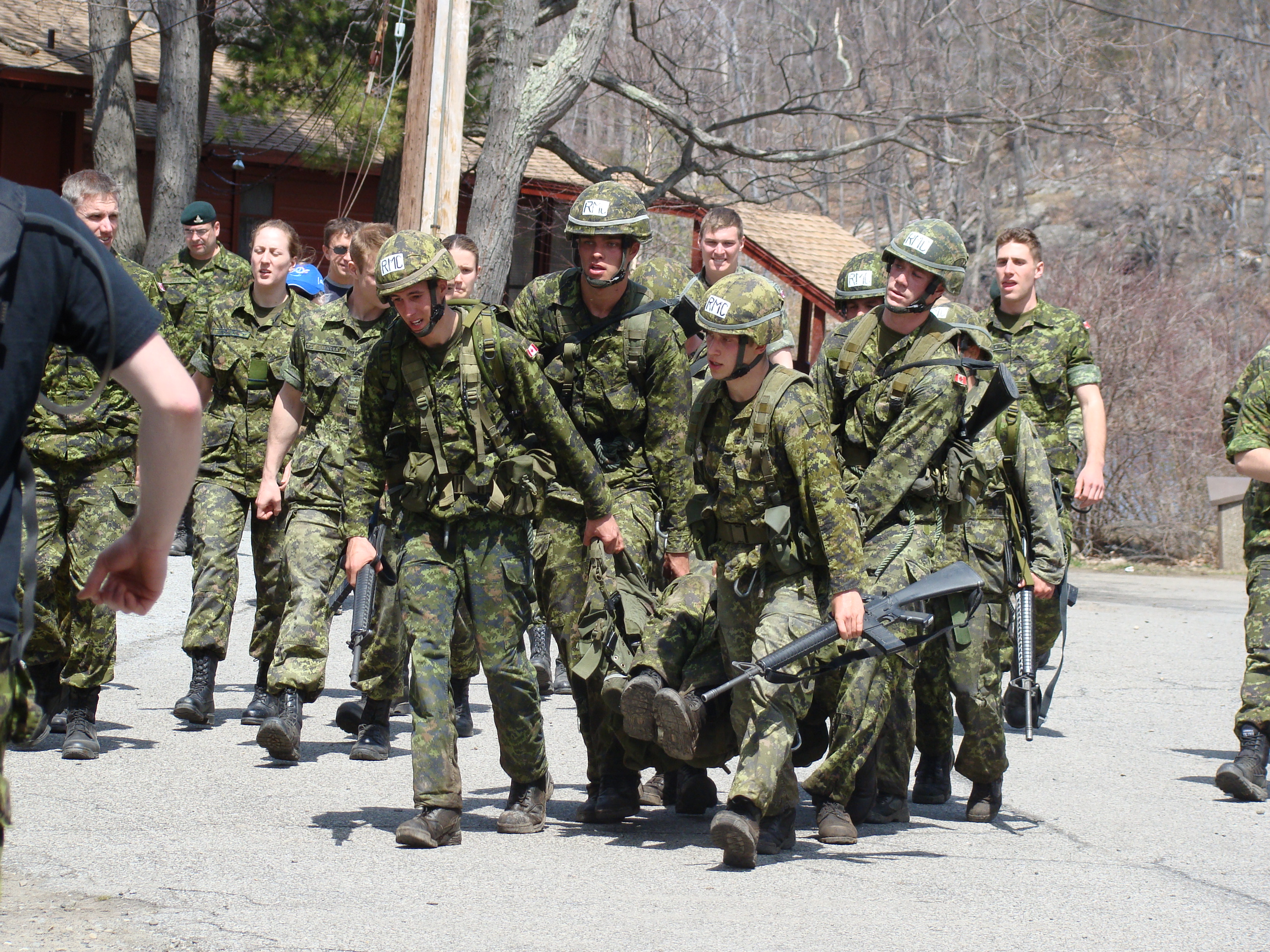
Royal Military College of Canada Cadets compete at Sandhurst Competition in 2009

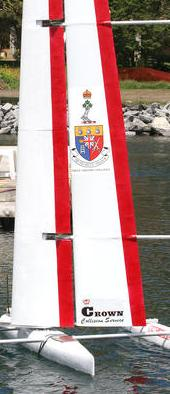
Royal Military College of Canada Robotic Sailboat

One of the four components of the Royal Military College of Canada, the Athletic component provides opportunities for officer cadets to participate in physical activities and sports that are mentally demanding to develop their physical capabilities, confidence and leadership. Physical education is meant "to establish a strong foundation of skills and knowledge in physical fitness, sports, and military-related activities through a progressive and diverse physical education program for RMC Officer Cadets" The Vision is "foster a passion for active living and leadership in physical activity." To enhance their physical fitness and develop military and athletic skills necessary to lead their troops, Cadets must take physical education classes and play intramural sports every year – for a minimum of four hours per week.

== Military training ==
As an RMC cadet, military training begins with Basic Military Officer Qualification (BMOQ) in the summer prior to first year and prior to second year at the Canadian Forces Leadership and Recruit School Saint-Jean. After the completion of BMOQ, those cadets who are not yet bilingual are usually enrolled in a seven-week period of Second Language Training (SLT) at Canadian Forces Language School Detachment Saint-Jean, or may remain in Kingston to study a second official language. The remaining summers are spent doing various other training depending on the specific elements or occupations of each cadet.

=== First Year Orientation Period ===
First Year Orientation Period, (FYOP) is the most demanding challenge many cadets will face during their time at the college. FYOP takes place during the first month of the academic year following the completion of the first mod of BMOQ. Prior to the 2015–16 academic year, cadets would attend 2 week program called recruit camp in which cadets would undergo some basic military training before entering the college. With newly hired cadets completing half of their BMOQ before attending RMC, recruit camp is no longer necessary. FYOP is like Frosh week at civilian universities, except it lasts four weeks and cadets are placed under extreme stress for nearly the entire duration. FYOP begins with the Arch parade where the entire First Year class is marched onto College grounds by their FYOP staff consisting of Third and Fourth Years.

During the course of FYOP, First Year cadets are required to keep an exceptionally high standard of dress and deportment. They are required to march at all times. Physical Training is conducted, with long runs up neighbouring Fort Henry, Ontario hill a frequent occurrence. Inspections of room standards and dress are conducted daily. For the duration of FYOP, First Years are not permitted to leave RMC or receive visitors. Mail and phone calls are allowed but are limited.

The culmination of the FYOP is the obstacle course. The obstacle course lasts over 2 hours and consists of twelve obstacles built by each squadron located around the college grounds. Obstacles such as a 12-foot wall and rope bridge are designed to test teamwork and physical fitness of First Years. The First Year flights are judged on the time it takes to complete each obstacle. The completion of the obstacle course signals the end of FYOP. Afterwards, First Years are given a parade where they are officially welcomed into RMC and join the Cadet Wing. Cadets are then allowed to see their friends and relatives, and are allowed the freedom to leave college grounds. In previous years, cadets were required to wear their College uniform when leaving the college grounds, but as of 2017 this rule has been modified; cadets can now wear civilian business casual clothes. When attending formal events, the college uniform worn is the number 4s. This form of dress consists of dark blue pants with a red stripe down the side and a dark blue tunic. Badges can be put on both arms once earned. The year is also represented on the lower arms by red ribbon; however, second year is the first to have any red ribbon.

Second year cadets, in RMC's academic mentorship program, are paired with first year cadets as "academic parents" to mentor, guide, and influence them during their study at the college. This program, however, relies entirely on the second year cadet's following through on their due diligence to mentor their "academic children", as there is almost no staff (commissioned officer / non-commissioned member) oversight over the ongoings of either the FYOP or academic mentorship program, outside of general rule-making.

Many of the aspects of the FYOP, including the obstacle course and mentorship program, were developed by the post-war Chesley committee, led by Brigadier Leonard McEwan Chelsey, O.B.E., E.D. The committee made recommendations about the education and training of officer candidates for the postwar active force. In addition, the committee made recommendations about the provision of French-speaking officers and arrangements for promotion from the ranks.

== Campus and facilities ==
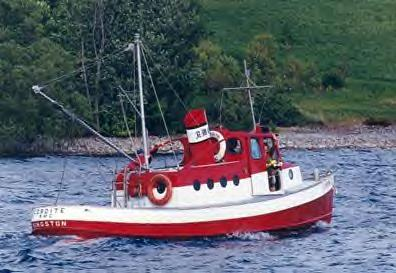
MV Cordite, Royal Military College of Canada

RMC is located on Point Frederick (Kingston, Ontario), a small peninsula at the point where the St. Lawrence River leaves Lake Ontario and where the Rideau Canal system starts. The location has been an active military base since 1789 and the Kingston Royal Naval Dockyard, located on the site, was an important dockyard during the War of 1812.

Point Frederick includes two sites with National Historic Site of Canada designations: the Royal Navy Dockyard and the Point Frederick Buildings

The Stone Frigate, a large stone building completed in 1820 by Sir Robert Barrie, was designed to hold gear and rigging from British warships dismantled in compliance with the Rush–Bagot Treaty. It served as a barracks briefly in 1837–38, and was refitted as a dormitory and classrooms to house RMC by 1876.

During the Great Depression in Canada of the 1930s, an unemployment relief camp on Barriefield lower common was set up under the command of the RMC Commandant. Public works projects relied on the labour of the 'Royal Twenty Centres' supplied by the under the Unemployment Relief Commission. The public works projects included rebuilding the dry stone wall and moat of Fort Frederick; the physics building extension, the connection from the Fort Frederick dormitory to the new Yeo mess building, the new wing of the hospital, a new garage, road work, levelling the grounds at RMC for new football fields and a new running track. The cornerstone of Yeo Hall was laid in 1934 by the Earl of Bessborough, HE The Gov Gen. Yeo Hall was opened in 1936.

The Officers' Mess was moved in 1960 to the Senior Staff Mess at which point 'Bill & Alfie's' became a recreational space for Senior Cadets. There were renovations to Fort LaSalle dormitory and Yeo Hall between 1993–1995 to accommodate the closure of the other two colleges. In 1997, there were additions to the Dining Room, and an extension for the kitchen and servery above which is the Cadet Mess at Yeo Hall.

Both Royal Military College of Canada chapels serving Roman Catholic, Protestant and Muslim communities are located in Yeo Hall.

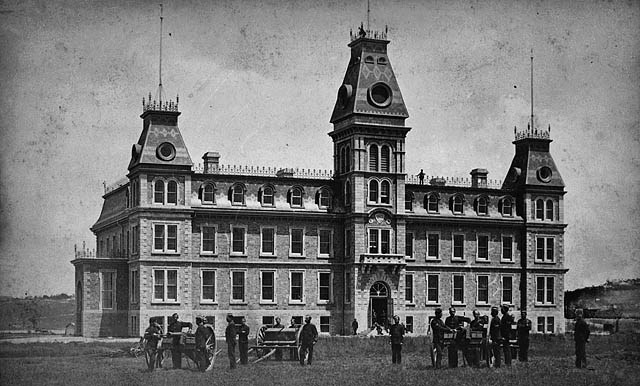
Mackenzie Building, Royal Military College of Canada, in 1880

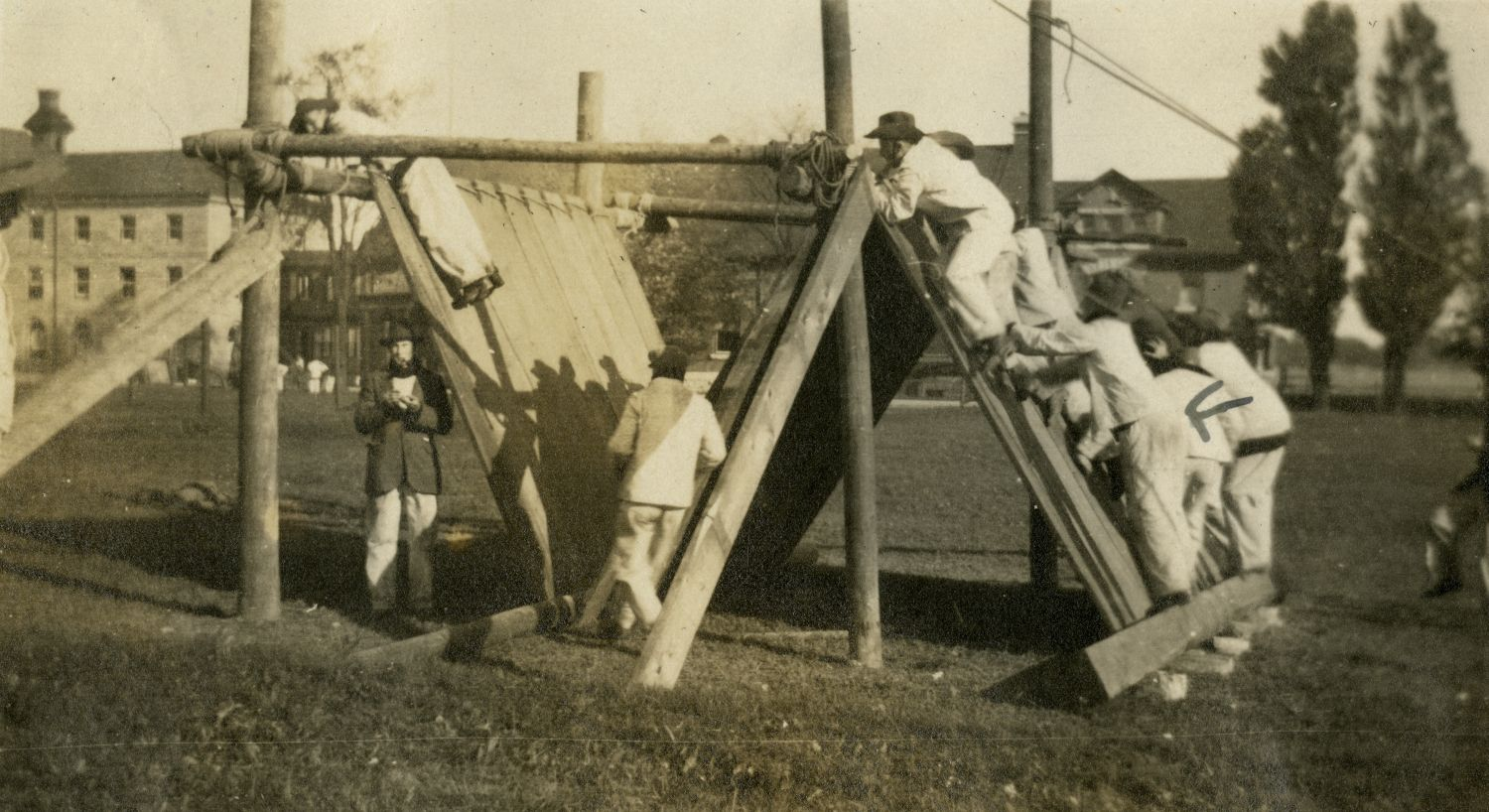
Obstacle course training at the Royal Military College of Canada

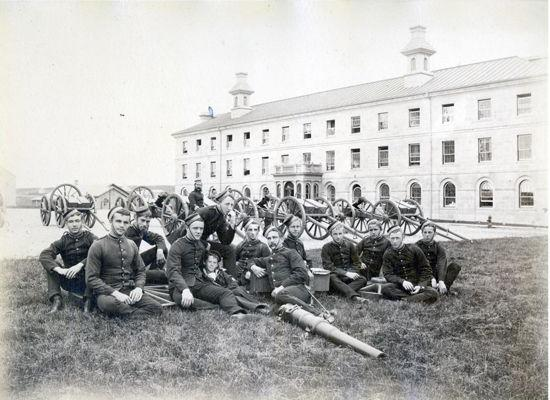
Royal Military College of Canada cadets train with armstrong field guns c 1885; Stone Frigate

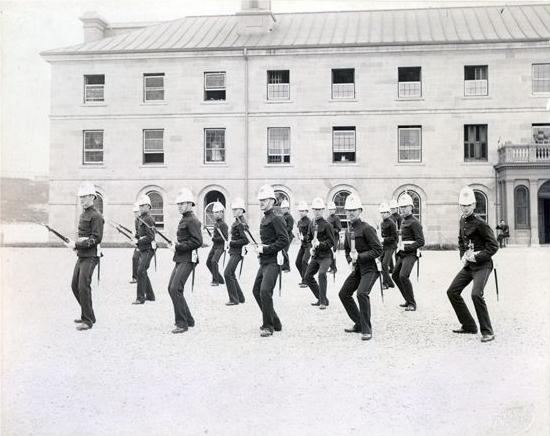
Royal Military College of Canada cadets drill in parade square, Stone Frigate 1880s

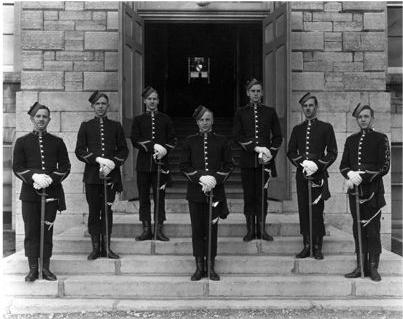
Royal Military College of Canada cadets c 1880s

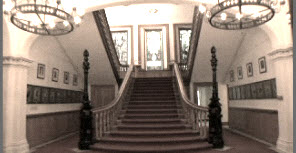
Royal Military College of Canada Mackenzie building entrance

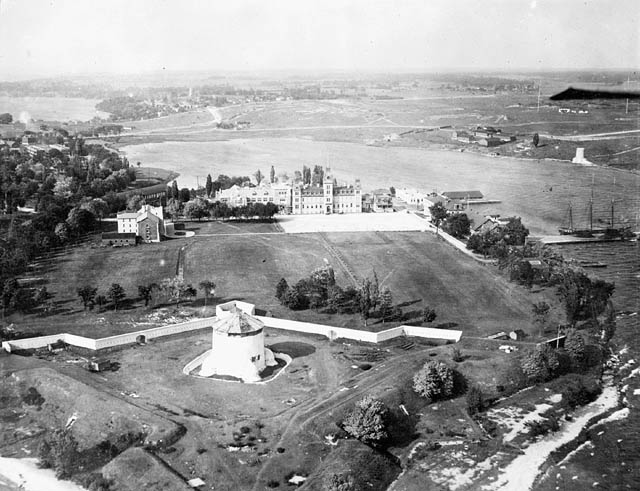
Royal Military College of Canada Campus in 1920

=== Buildings ===
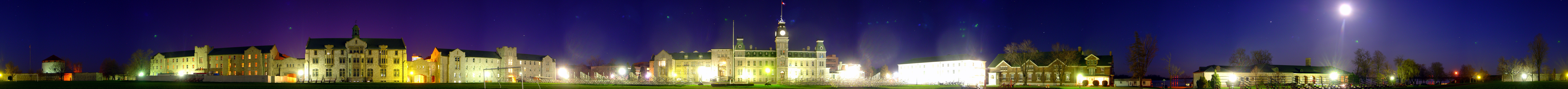
The Royal Military College of Canada in Kingston, Ontario

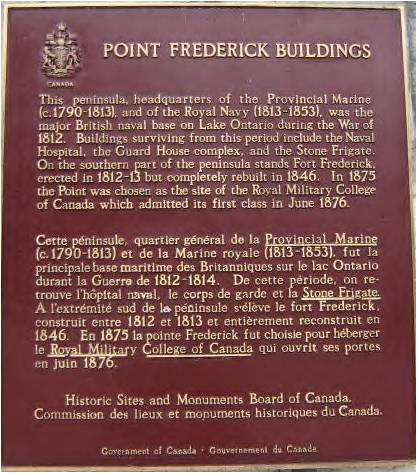

The property includes elements of several National Historic Sites of Canada Point Frederick Buildings NHSC, Kingston Royal Naval Dockyard NHSC, the Fort Frederick (Kingston, Ontario) component of Kingston Fortifications NHSC; Rideau Canal; and part of a UNESCO World Heritage Site. The Register of the Government of Canada Heritage Buildings lists five Classified Federal Heritage Buildings and twenty-three Recognized Federal Heritage Buildings on the Royal Military College of Canada grounds:

The Chief Dominion Architect(s) designed a number of public buildings at the college: Thomas Seaton Scott (1872–1881); Thomas Fuller (architect) (1881–1896); David Ewart (1896–1914); Edgar Lewis Horwood (1914–1917); Richard Cotsman Wright (1918–1927); Thomas W. Fuller (1927–1936), Charles D. Sutherland (1936–1947) and Joseph Charles Gustave Brault (1947–1952). Thomas Seaton Scott and Thomas Fuller adopted the Neo-Gothic style. David Ewart embraced the Baronial style. Richard Cotsman Wright (1918–1927) adopted the Collegiate Gothic style.

Name	Address	Coordinates	Government recognition (CRHP №)	Wikidata ID	Image
Royal Military College of Canada Building 2 Gatehouse 1 (1884)	Neo-Gothic style by Thomas Fuller; Kingston ON	44°14′06″N 76°28′13″W	Federal (11224)		Upload Photo
Royal Military College of Canada Building 3 Workshop, former Riding School (1916)	designed by Edgar Lewis Horwood; recognized Federal Heritage Building 1994; Kingston ON	44°14′06″N 76°28′09″W	Federal (11327)		Upload Photo
Royal Military College of Canada Building 5, Headquarters, Former RMC Riding Establishment (1908)	Arts and Crafts style by H.B. Smith; recognized Federal Heritage Building 1994; Kingston ON	44°14′02″N 76°28′01″W	Federal (11197)		
Royal Military College of Canada Building 6 Gatehouse 2 (1884)	Neo-Gothic style by Thomas Fuller; recognized Federal Heritage Building 1994; Kingston ON	44°14′00″N 76°28′00″W	Federal (11244)		Upload Photo
Royal Military College of Canada Hewett House, Building 8 (1875 to 1876)	architect Thomas Seaton Scott; recognized Federal Heritage Building 1990; Kingston ON	44°14′00″N 76°28′00″W	Federal (4807)		
Royal Military College of Canada Building 9 Rideout Row (1908); after renovations known as Rideout Square	Baronial style by David Ewart recognized Federal Heritage Building 1994; Kingston ON	44°14′03″N 76°28′06″W	Federal (11166)		Upload Photo
Royal Military College of Canada Rideout Row Building 9a former married housing now used as administrative offices	Baronial style by David Ewart (1908) recognized Federal Heritage Building 1994; Kingston ON	44°14′03″N 76°28′07″W	Federal (11168)		Upload Photo
Royal Military College of Canada Commandants Residence, former Royal Navy Hospital, Building 10	recognized Federal Heritage Building 1996; Kingston ON	44°14′00″N 76°28′00″W	Federal (4391)		
Royal Military College of Canada Currie Building, Building No. 15	designed by Richard Cotsman Wright Collegiate Gothic style. recognized Federal Heritage Building 1996 honours Lieutenant-General Sir Arthur Currie; Kingston ON	44°14′00″N 76°28′00″W	Federal (4389)		
Royal Military College of Canada, MacKenzie Building, Building 16 (1876 to 1878)	Thomas Seaton Scott Classified Federal Heritage Building 1993; Kingston ON	44°14′00″N 76°28′00″W	Federal (4382)		
Royal Military College of Canada Stone Frigate (No. 23) (1819–1824)	by Archibald Fraser;Recognized Federal Heritage Building 1996; Kingston ON	44°14′00″N 76°28′00″W	Federal (4388)		
Royal Military College of Canada Building 24 Tailor Shop, former Gun Shed (1914)	Baronial style by David Ewart recognized Federal Heritage Building 1994; Kingston ON	44°13′48″N 76°27′58″W	Federal (11184)		
Royal Military College of Canada Building 27 Panet House (1903)	Baronial style by David Ewart; recognized Federal Heritage Building 1994; Kingston ON	44°13′44″N 76°28′01″W	Federal (11113)		
Royal Military College of Canada Building 30a Lunette and Guardhouse Building (1846)	recognized Federal Heritage Building 1994; Kingston ON	44°17′17″N 76°28′08″W	Federal (11132)		
Royal Military College of Canada Fort Frederick Martello Tower (1846 to 1847)	classified Federal Heritage Building (1996); Kingston ON	44°13′59″N 76°28′01″W	Federal (10895)		
Royal Military College of Canada Fort Frederick Magazine Building R30B (1846)	recognized Federal Heritage Building 1994 honours Frederick, Prince of Wales; Kingston ON	44°13′38″N 76°28′12″W	Federal (11099)		Upload Photo
Royal Military College of Canada Memorial Arch (1923)	John M. Lyle; Kingston ON	44°13′38″N 76°28′12″W	Federal (11332)		
Royal Military College of Canada Building 31 Fort Haldimand (1950)	recognized Federal Heritage Building 1996; Kingston ON	44°13′44″N 76°28′11″W	Federal (11332)		
Royal Military College, Yeo Hall Mess Building 32 (1935)	Thomas W. Fuller; honours Sir James Lucas Yeo; recognized Federal Heritage Building 1990; Kingston ON	44°14′00″N 76°28′00″W	Federal (4811)		
Royal Military College of Canada Building 33 Fort Lasalle Dormitory Building (1912)	Baronial style by David Ewart; recognized Federal Heritage Building 1996; Kingston ON	44°13′44″N 76°28′11″W	Federal (4812)		
Royal Military College of Canada Building 34 Fort Champlain Cadet Dormitory (1965)	recognized Federal Heritage Building 2002; Kingston ON	44°13′44″N 76°28′11″W	Federal (2672)		
Royal Military College of Canada Building 36 former Riding Stables now Printing Workshop	David Ewart (1905) recognized Federal Heritage Building 1994; Kingston ON	44°14′07″N 76°28′08″W	Federal (11101)		Upload Photo
Royal Military College of Canada Commandants Guest House Building R47	recognized Federal Heritage Building 1996; Kingston ON	44°14′00″N 76°28′00″W	Federal (4391)		Upload Photo
Royal Military College, Old Gymnasium, Building 25 (1900–1903)	Baronial style by David Ewart recognized Federal Heritage Building 1989; Kingston ON	44°14′00″N 76°28′00″W	Federal (4753)		
Royal Military College of Canada Building 55, Administration Building, former Hospital, Building (1887)	Neo-Gothic style designed by Henry James under Thomas Fuller (architect) (1887); Kingston ON	44°13′48″N 76°28′01″W	Federal (11325)		

=== Other campus buildings ===
Building (built)	Recognition	Image
Ross Block Building FF07	recognized Federal Heritage Building 1990	
Sawyer building (1977)	engineering building honours 1557 Col WR Sawyer (RMC 1920), Vice Commandant & Director of Studies, RMC 1948–67	
Senior Staff Mess (1960–1962)	two large landscape paintings of the Rocky Mountains in the lounge have plaques indicating that they were presented by ex-cadets in memory of the times spent with their former drawing instructor, Forshaw Day. One is entitled "On the Bow" whilst the other is untitled.	
Massey Library (1960)	honours Rt Hon Vincent Massey	Massey library at Royal Military College of Canada
Fort Sauvé Dormitory Building Building 81 (2001)	honours Rt Hon Jeanne Sauvé	
Fort Brant Dormitory Building 86 (2010)	honours Chief Joseph Brant	

=== Libraries ===
The Royal Military College of Canada Libraries is a member of the Ontario Council of University Libraries and is a contributor to Open Content Alliance.

The Massey Library collection consists of approximately 250,000 books, 1,800 audio-visual items and 1,200 periodicals in English and French. The library possesses RMC historical material including cadet photographs, scrapbooks, collections, diaries, and letters. The major collections follow:

Collection	Year	Significance
Leadership	2006–present	donated by the class of 1956
John W. Spurr (former RMC chief librarian)	post WWII	Military science
Reginald E. Watters	1980–present	Canadian literature
General Harry Crerar (Commanding general of the First Canadian Army during Second World War)	1939–1945	German language military and technical manuals

=== Dormitories ===
RMC has six dormitories, which are similar to most universities and provide the basic necessities. Organized by squadron, dormitories are co-educational with separate washrooms for men and women. Officer Cadets share a room in first year, and sometimes in succeeding years depending on availability of space, if possible with someone who is proficient in the other official language.

The oldest, the Stone Frigate was built in 1819–20 and is a Canadian Heritage Site. The Stone Frigate, known within the college as "The Boat" houses 1 Squadron who in turn call themselves the Stone Frigate Military Academy. The next building built Fort Lasalle holds 7, 8, and 9 squadron while the third building, Fort Haldimand hosts 11 and 12 Squadron. Fort Champlain (1965) accommodates the Cadet Wing Headquarters and 2 and 3 Squadron. Fort Sauve (2001) houses 4, 5, and 6 Squadron and the newest dormitory, Fort Brant (2011) aka "The Greenhouse" houses ILOY and 10 squadron. Fort Brant was called such due to the overheating problems experienced by the massive glass façade which by facing south traps a large amount of solar heat which is then circulated throughout the building.

== Honorary degrees ==
The nominations for honorary degrees by the Royal Military Colleges can be initiated by different organizations or individuals, including the Royal Military Colleges Club of Canada through any member of the college senate. As with most of Canadian universities, the senate, which in the case of RMC is composed of the Chancellor (Minister of National Defence), the Vice Chancellor (The RMCC Commandant), Principal, Deans, DCadet, Registrar and the Directeur des Etudes du Royal Military College Saint-Jean, makes the final decision. The Royal Military Colleges Club of Canada (RMCCC) has no responsibility or authority in the process of granting honorary degrees.

== Alumni ==
The RMC alumni association (RMC Club) was inaugurated in 1885. The RMC Club was incorporated under the Statutes of Ontario in 1898.

The Royal Military Colleges of Canada Foundation is a registered Canadian charity which was incorporated in 1966. As an element of the Canadian Forces, the college is unable to fund a conventional full-time fundraising team in a development office. The foundation, consequently, works at arm's length to assist the college financially. Capital campaigns have included the 2364 Leonard Birchall Pavilion (2007), the Memorial Arch Restoration (2001) and the New Library Campaign (2013).

== Artist-in-Residence ==
The Royal Military College of Canada launched its Artist-in-Residence program in January 2010 with Steven Heighton, a novelist and poet as the first to hold the post. The third person to hold the position, playwright Dr. Julie Salverson, presented "Drama, Imagination, and RMC" on 3 April 2012 in Currie Hall. Dr. Salverson, who has conducted drama workshops with cadets since the early 1990s, helped facilitate a play about RMC, "Shakespeare in Scarlets" in 2012. In 2014, the Artist-in-Residence was Gord Sinclair of The Tragically Hip, who put together a concert on the parade square where cadets, staff, and faculty performed for their peers at an event dubbed Bruciepalooza. Both The Trews and guitarist Rob Baker of The Tragically Hip made unexpected guest appearances to perform for the college. Kingston photographer Chris Miner held the position throughout the 2014–15 academic year, culminating in a gallery exhibition of his work along with winning photographs by students, staff, and faculty submitted as part of the Photo Op 2015 photography contest. In the winter term of the 2015–2016 academic year, Canadian novelist and poet Helen Humphreys was the Artist-in-Residence, and held weekly workshops on novel writing and poetry.

== Media ==
- RMC cadets once produced the campus newspaper, the Precision, however this does not exist anymore. The alumni association produces Veritas and e-Veritas.
- Currently, a campus newspaper called "The Slasher Standard" circulates around RMC producing satirical material.

== Symbols, memorials and traditions ==
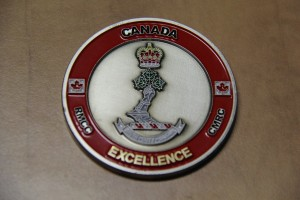
Commandant coin of excellence at RMC may be awarded to students, alumni or staff.

e.g. Triumphal arch; Trophies, Commemorative and Memorial Trees, Monuments, Plaques, and Others. This includes a list of RMC Traditions and RMC Militaria & Collectibles

In honour of Remembrance Day, 2012 students in Dr Erika Behrisch Elce's first-year English for science and engineering students wrote a sonnet on behalf of one of those connected with Royal Military College of Canada who died doing his or her duty. A printed collection will also soon be available through the College Library for general distribution.

The RMC's official cheer is the following:

Call: Gimme a beer!
Response: Beer! Esses! Emma! T-D-V!
Who can stop old RMC!
Shrapnel, Cordite, NCT!
R-M-C Hooah!

=== Heraldry ===
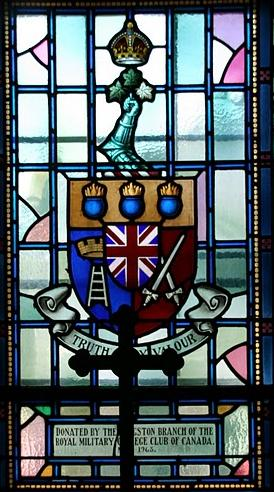
A stained glass window displaying the RMC coat of arms

King George V granted and assigned the Armorial Ensigns for the Royal Military College of Canada in 1920. The description is:

"Per pale Azure and Gules on the Dexter side a Scaling Ladder Argent ensigned by a Mural Crown Or and on the Sinister side two Swords in saltire of the third points upward, on a Chief of the fourth three grenades of the first fired proper, an Inescutcheon charged with the Union Badge and for the Crest on a Wreath of the Colours An Arm in armour embowed gauntletted and holding a Sprig of three Maple Leaves and ensigned by the Imperial Crown all proper, as the same are in the painting hereunto annexed more plainly depicted to be borne by our said Royal Military College of Canada on Seals, Shields, Banners, Flags or otherwise according to the Laws of Arms."

=== Motto ===
The first college Commandant, Lieut. Colonel Hewett, made the first public announcement of the college motto and 'device' (badge) during a prize presentation held at the Kingston Military College on 11 February 1878. "I now have to tell you Gentlemen Cadets, that a device and motto has been selected for the Military College. The device, a mailed arm bearing a maple leaf; symbolical of the position you, as the future officers of Canada, should hold towards your country as represented by the maple leaf. The motto, "Truth, Duty, and Valour,"- three simple words in plain English -that all who run may read."

These words by Professor Robert Carr Harris, RMC's first Professor of Engineering, were recalled when his son No. 1118 Major G. G. M. Carr-Harris unveiled a plaque in the entrance to the Currie Building in 1964 to the memory of his father "Engineering, leads a man among actions, thoughts, and associations which are useful and honourable, and a life so spent will leave its mark upon anyone's character." The Harris memorial plaque is alongside one commemorating the first Commandant Major Edward Osborne Hewett who chose the college motto, "Truth, Duty, Valour". The Hewett plaque is alongside one commemorating the first Staff Adjutant Major Raymond N.R. Reade, a British officer sent to the RMC from London in 1901, who authorized construction of a gymnasium, a hospital, an electrical plant, and a permanent accommodation for the staff-adjutant and his family.

=== Music ===
The RMC march, Precision was composed by Madame Denise Chabot, the wife of an RMC staff member, Major C.A. Chabot. She was inspired by the sound of the cadets marching past married quarters. The march starts, "We are the gentlemen cadets of RMC. We have sworn to love and serve Her Majesty…"

The College March for bagpipe is Alexander Mackenzie

== In fiction and popular culture ==
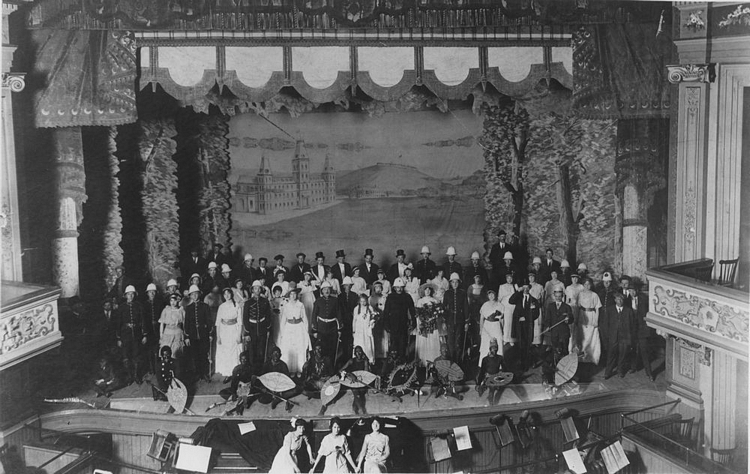
Leo the Royal Cadet, Grand Theatre, Kingston 3–5 Jun 1915

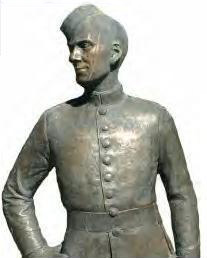
Royal Military College Club of Canada's centennial gift Truth Duty Valour (1976), the cadet statue by William McElcheran now known as 'Brucie'

The Royal Military College's central place in Canadian military circles has made it the setting for novels, plays, films and other cultural works:

- Oscar Ferdinand Telgmann and George Frederick Cameron created "Leo the Royal Cadet", an 1889 opera in which Leo leaves his sweetheart Nellie to serve in the Anglo-Zulu War. Songs about cadet life include 'The Bulldogs', and 'The Royal Cadet'
- Can You Tell Me The Reason Why? (1894) a song about life at the Royal Military College of Canada, was written by A.H.N. Kennedy (1888) & B.H.O. Armstrong (1889)
- The R.M.C. march & two step for piano dedicated to the Cadets of the Royal Military College, Kingston by Jessie Campbell Taylor published by the National Litho. Co., c. 1900 in Toronto.
- "Precision" (1933) film by The Associated Screen News Ltd. is "A sample look at discipline at the Royal Military College. The emphasis is on precision gymnastics displays, ceremonial battalion marches in full uniform, and the changing of the sentry demonstrated by gentlemen cadets of the College. Seen is the exterior of the RMC buildings (the Stone Frigate)."
- In Jetstream, a 2007 television series airing on Discovery Canada about pilots training to fly the CF-18 Hornet in the Canadian Forces, seven of the eight pilots are graduates of the RMC.
- Timothy Findley's fictional character Robert Ross in his World War I novel ‘the Wars’ (Penguin Canada 2005) studied military law and trajectory mathematics at the Royal Military College of Canada. His novel won the Governor General's Award for fiction and was adapted into a play. In 1985, Timothy Findley was appointed an Officer of the Order of Canada.
- 1982 John-James Ford's protagonist in his coming-of-age novel Bonk on the Head studied at the Royal Military College of Canada. The novel won the 2006 Ottawa Book Award in the English fiction category.
- "Till we meet again", is a musical set in Montreal, Quebec during World War II. Each act features an interview with an ex Royal Military College of Canada cadet who is a Canadian army officer: after Dunkirk, after Dieppe and after Juno Beach.
- Sara Jeanette Duncan's "Cousin Cinderella: A Canadian Girl in London" by Macmillan in New York and Methuen in London (1908) features Graham, a Royal Military College of Canada graduate, and his sister Mary Trent. Graham and Mary's father, Senator Trent has earned a fortune in the family lumber business. After serving in South Africa and entering the family lumber business Graham Trent travels with his sister Mary from Minnebiac, a fictional small town in Ontario to England. There, Graham Trent becomes engaged to Barbara Pavisay, a member of a proud old English family whose line extends back to the Tudors. When Barbara Pavisay breaks off the engagement to Graham, his sister Mary becomes engaged to Barbara's brother Lord Pavisay. It is assumed that Graham Trent will return to Canada, continue in the family business and be elected to Parliament. Sara Jeanette Duncan's "A Voyage of Consolation" is a sequel to "Cousin Cinderella: A Canadian Girl in London."
- Dr. David Clark's Canadian Army Trilogy–The Ridge (1994), Lamone (2001), and Lucifer's Gate (2002)–outlines the stories of two generations of the Warwick family and the Canadian Army in World War I. In Lucifer's Gate, Captain James Niles, a Royal Military College graduate, is posted temporarily to a recruit training battalion. He is a professional officer, all spit and polish, everything by the King's Regulations. After ordering a crowd to disperse, Niles accepts thanks from German proprietors of a tailor shop, Hans and Analise Holzhauer, and falls for their daughter, Rosamund. The lovely Rosamund is unfortunately an unsuitable match since they are worlds apart in social position. Niles, who is practically engaged to the Colonel's daughter, Roselyn, comes to realize, while serving under General Arthur Currie in France, that Roselyn never has a serious thought, caring only about tennis and garden parties.

== See also ==
- Royal Military College of Canada Museum
- Royal Military College Saint-Jean
- Royal Roads Military College
- Royal Naval College of Canada
- Canadian Interuniversity Sport
- Canadian government scientific research organizations
- Canadian university scientific research organizations
- Canadian industrial research and development organizations
- The Canadian Crown and the Canadian Forces
- Defence Research and Development Canada
- Khaki University
- List of Ontario Universities
- Canadian Military Colleges
- Canadian Coast Guard College

Other countries:

- Royal Military Academy Sandhurst – the British Army equivalent
- Australian Defence Force Academy - the Australian Defence Force equivalent
- United States Military Academy West Point
- Britannia Royal Naval College (after the closure of Royal Naval College, Greenwich this remains the only operational Naval college in the UK) – the Royal Navy equivalent
- Royal Air Force College Cranwell – the Royal Air Force equivalent
- Officer Training Unit, Scheyville
