= Rush–Bagot Treaty =

1818 British and American naval treaty

Exchange of Notes Relative to Naval Forces on the American Lakes
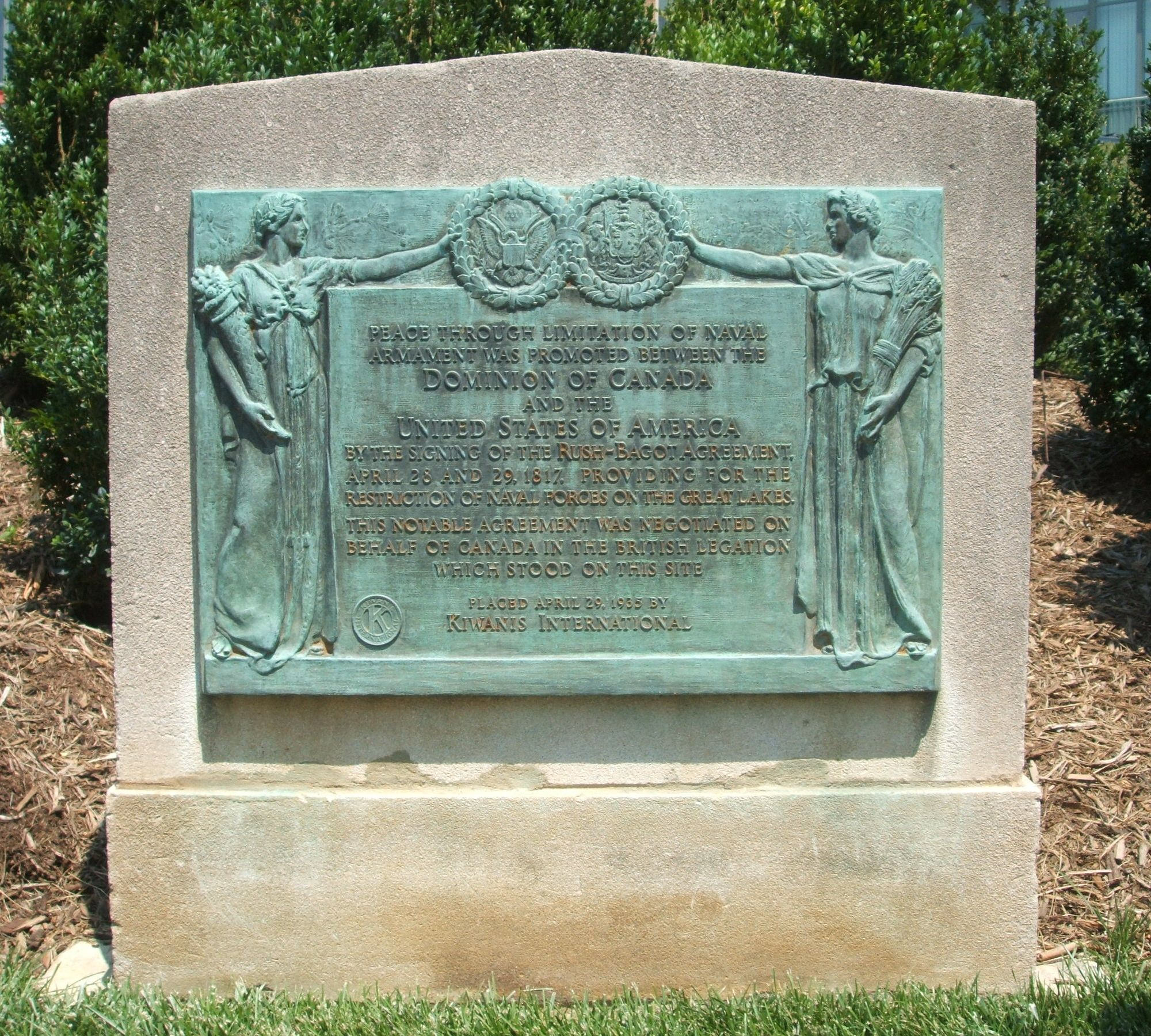
- Historical marker where the Rush–Bagot Agreement was made in Washington, D.C.
- Type: Arms control
- Context: Aftermath of the War of 1812
- Signed: April 28 and 29, 1817
- Location: 2425 L Street NW, Washington, D.C.
- Effective: April 28, 1818
- Negotiators: (United States) Richard Rush; (United Kingdom of Great Britain and Ireland) Charles Bagot
- Signatories: (United States) James Monroe; (United Kingdom of Great Britain and Ireland) George III
- Parties: United States; United Kingdom
- Language: English

Full text
- Rush-Bagot Treaty at Wikisource

The Rush–Bagot Treaty or Rush–Bagot Disarmament was a treaty between the United States and Great Britain limiting naval armaments on the Great Lakes and Lake Champlain, following the War of 1812. It was ratified by the United States Senate on April 16, 1818, and was confirmed by Canada, following Confederation in 1867.

The treaty provided for a large demilitarization of lakes along the international boundary, where many British naval arrangements and forts remained. The treaty stipulated that the United States and British North America could each maintain one military vessel (no more than 100 tons burden) as well as one cannon (no more than eighteen pounds) on Lake Ontario and Lake Champlain. The remaining Great Lakes permitted the United States and British North America to keep two military vessels "of like burden" on the waters armed with "like force". The treaty, and the separate Treaty of 1818, laid the basis for a demilitarized boundary between the U.S. and British North America.

== History ==
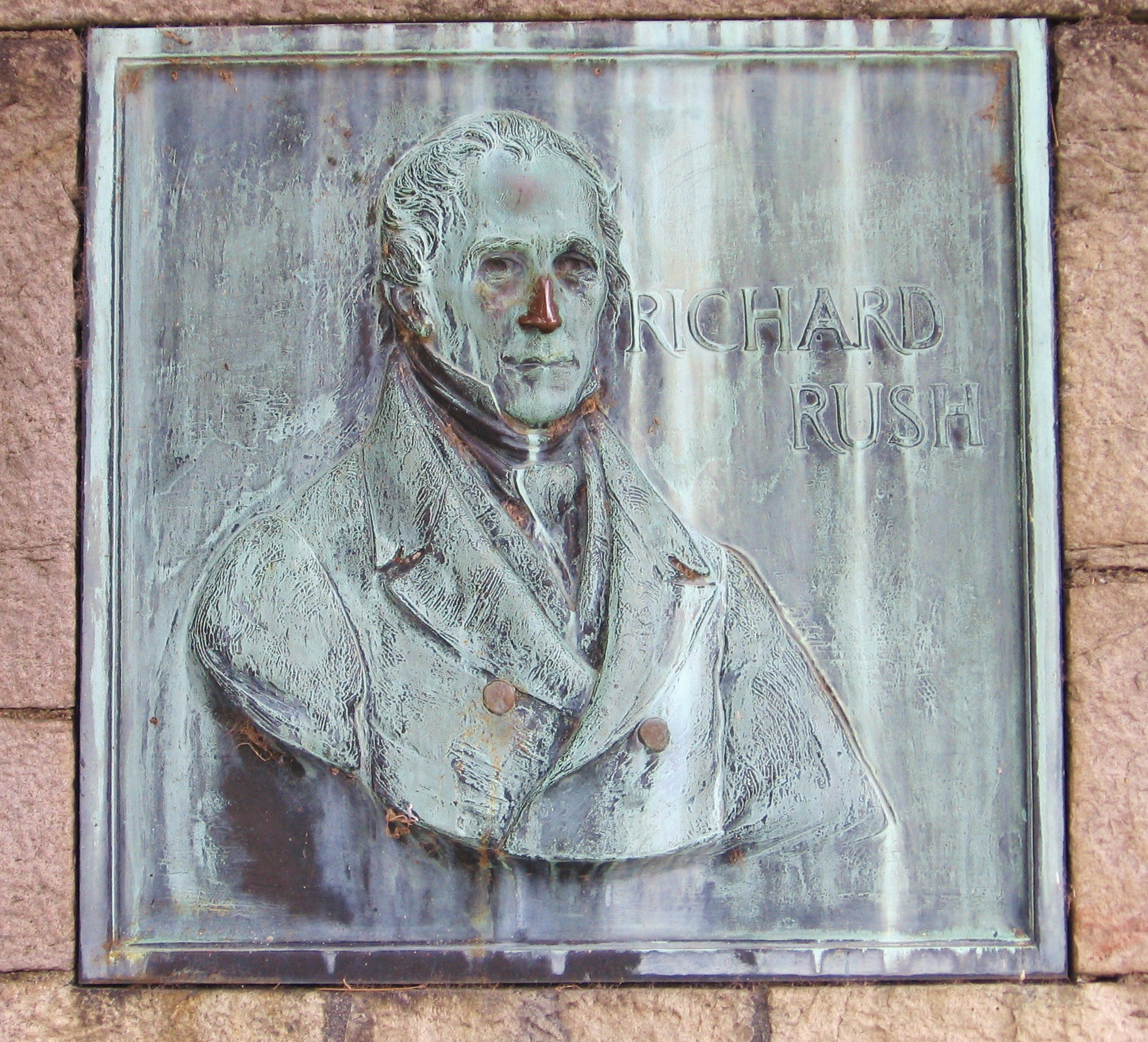
Plaque to Richard Rush, U.S. diplomat, at Old Fort Niagara

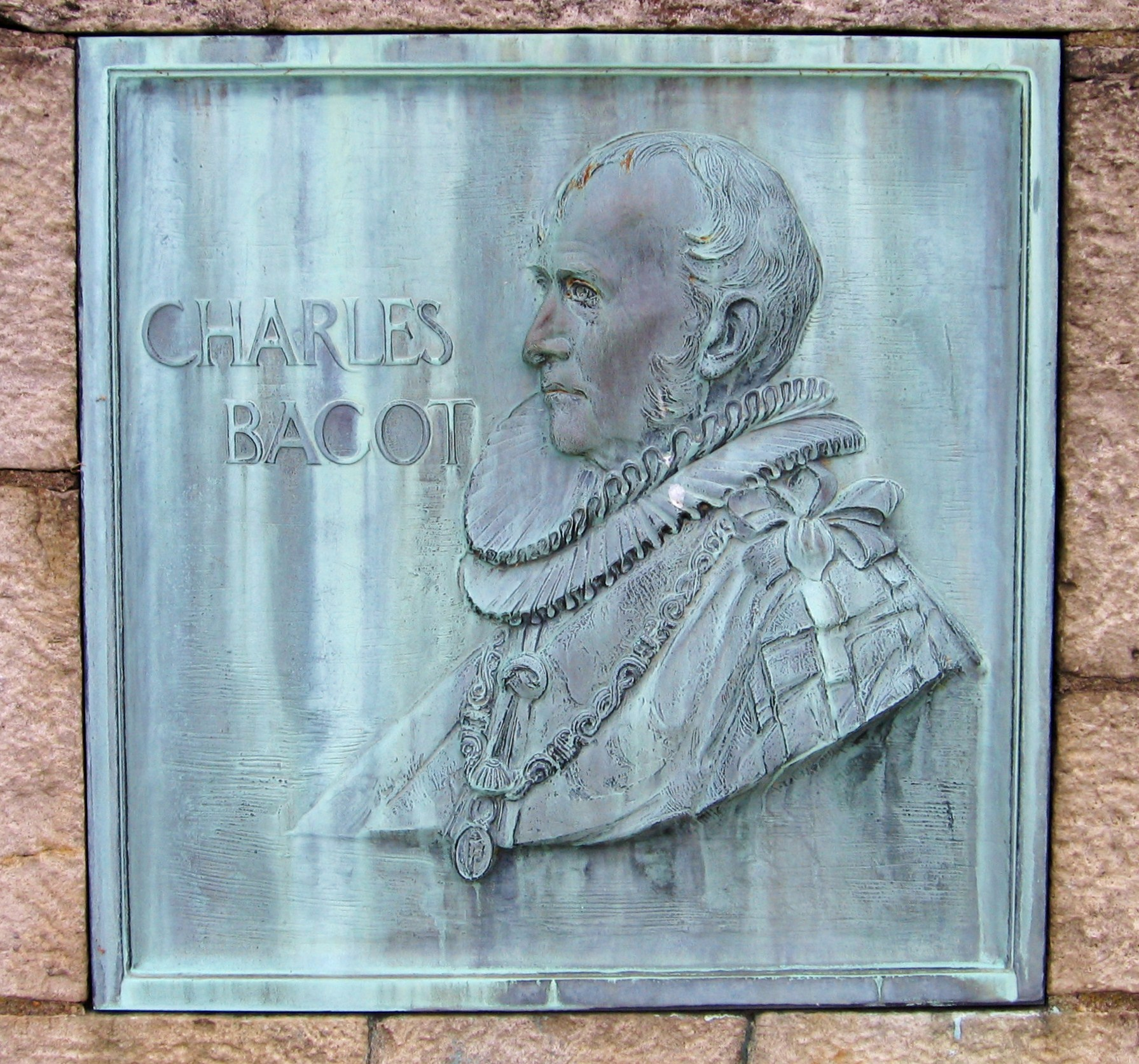
Plaque to Charles Bagot, British diplomat, at Old Fort Niagara

The origins of the Rush–Bagot Treaty can be traced to diplomatic efforts following the War of 1812, as both Great Britain and the United States sought to reduce military tensions and avoid a costly arms race on the Great Lakes. Initial discussions began when U.S. Secretary of State James Monroe instructed John Quincy Adams in 1815 to propose mutual disarmament to the British government. Although early negotiations stalled, the British government eventually authorized Sir Charles Bagot, its minister in Washington, to resume talks. a correspondence of letters between Acting United States Secretary of State Richard Rush and the British Minister to Washington Sir Charles Bagot, which were exchanged and signed on April 27 and 28, 1817. After the terms of the notes were agreed upon by Rush and Bagot, the Rush–Bagot Agreement was unofficially recognized by both countries. On April 6, 1818, it was submitted to the United States Senate and formally ratified on April 16, 1818. The treaty eventually led to the Treaty of Washington of 1871, which completed disarmament. The United States and Canada agreed in 1946, through an exchange of diplomatic notes, that the stationing of naval vessels for training purposes was permissible provided each government was fully notified in advance.

In 2004, the U.S. Coast Guard decided to arm 11 of its small cutters stationed on Lake Erie and Lake Huron with M240 7.62 mm machine guns. The U.S. decision was based on a climbing number of smuggling operations as well as the increased threat of terrorist activity after the September 11, 2001, attacks. The Canadian government decided that the armament did not violate the treaty, as the guns were to be used for law enforcement rather than military activities. Canada reserved the right to arm its law enforcement vessels with similar weapons.

== Military installations ==
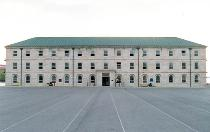
HMCS Stone Frigate, Royal Military College of Canada, Kingston, Ontario

HMCS Stone Frigate, located at the Royal Military College in Kingston, Ontario, was constructed during 1820 to store part of the dismantled British fleet from the War of 1812, which had been dismantled pursuant to the Rush–Bagot Treaty.

There are still military facilities near or next to the Great Lakes:

- Canada
  - ASU London Niagara-on-the-Lake Rifle Range at 1848 Lakeshore Avenue, Niagara-on-the-Lake: former rifle training centre, closed 2010 and transferred to Parks Canada, site of landing by American forces during War of 1812 (Battlefield of Newark May 25–27, 1813)
  - ASU London, London, Ontario: Original Wolseley Hall/Barracks closed after 2012 with local Primary Reserve units supported by ASU Toronto are now housed at Captain Neil Logistics Facility
  - Canadian Forces College, Toronto: general staff college
  - CFB Borden, Borden, Ontario: former training airbase, now Canadian Forces training centre, home to Regular Forces and Primary Reserve units
  - CFB Kingston, Kingston, Ontario: HQ to 1 Wing, CF training centre, HMCS Stone Frigate, HMCS Cataraqui Naval Reserve / Royal Canadian Sea Cadets base and home to Regular Forces and Primary Reserve units
  - CFB Trenton, Trenton, Ontario: largest airbase in Canada, home to 7 Transport Squadron including VIP transport, home to Regular Forces and Primary Reserve units (8 Wing), Joint Rescue Coordination Centre Trenton staffed with Canadian Coast Guard
  - CFD Mountain View, Prince Edward County, Ontario: storage of retired RCAF aircraft and also used as glider school for Royal Canadian Air Cadets units
  - Col J. R. Barber Armoury, Georgetown, Ontario: home to Primary Reserve / Royal Canadian Army Cadet and Royal Canadian Air Cadets units
  - Dalton Armoury, Toronto: home to Primary Reserve / Royal Canadian Army Cadet units
  - Denison Armoury / ASU Toronto, Toronto: former CFB Downsview airbase, 4th Canadian Division HQ, home to Regular Forces and Primary Reserve units; current armoury built in 2003 to replace original from 1961
  - Fort York Armoury, Toronto: Primary Reserve / Royal Canadian Army Cadet
  - HMCS Prevost Naval Reserve base, Port Stanley, Ontario: home to Royal Canadian Sea Cadets
  - HMCS Star Naval Reserve base - Hamilton
  - HMCS York Naval Reserve base, Toronto: home to Royal Canadian Sea Cadets
  - LFCATC Meaford, Meaford, Ontario: former tank training range, home to Regular Forces and Primary Reserve units
  - Moss Park Armoury, Toronto: home to Primary Reserve units; replaced Toronto Armories demolished 1963 to build Toronto City Hall
  - Oakville Armoury, Oakville, Ontario: home to Primary Reserve and Royal Canadian Army Cadets Corps
  - Royal Military College, Kingston, Ontario: cadet and staff college
  - Winona Rifle Range and Training Centre, Grimsby, Ontario: rifle training center; opened in 1938 and replaced Niagara-on-the-Lake Rifle Range in 2010
- United States
  - Camp Perry, Port Clinton, Ohio: Joint training base for Ohio National Guard / Ohio Military Reserve / Ohio Naval Militia
  - Duluth Air National Guard Base, Duluth, Minnesota : home to 148th Fighter Wing
  - Minneapolis Armory, Minneapolis: former Minnesota National Guard facility now closed and sold 1989
  - Camp Ripley, Little Falls, Minnesota: Minnesota National Guard training centre
  - Naval Station Great Lakes - North Chicago, Illinois - United States Navy recruit training facility
  - Niagara Falls Air Reserve Station, Niagara Falls, New York: home to USAF 914th Air Refueling Wing and 107th Attack Wing of the New York Air National Guard
  - Selfridge Air National Guard Base, Harrison Township, Michigan: home to 127th Wing of the Michigan Air National Guard, but also training facilities for Air Force Reserve, Navy Reserve, Marine Corps Reserve, Army Reserve, Army National Guard
  - General Mitchell Air National Guard Base at General Mitchell International Airport, Milwaukee: home to 128th Air Refueling Wing of Wisconsin Air National Guard

== Outcome ==
The Canada–United States border was demilitarized, including the Great Lakes and Lake Champlain. The U.S. and the British agreed to joint control over the Oregon Territory. The Rush–Bagot Agreement laid the foundation for the world's longest international boundary—8,891 kilometres (5,525 mi), and the longest demilitarized border in the world.

Although the treaty had caused difficulties during World War I, its terms were not changed. Similar problems occurred before World War II, but Secretary of State Cordell Hull wanted to preserve the agreement because of its historical importance. In 1939 and 1940, Canada and the United States agreed to interpret the treaty so that weapons could be installed in the Great Lakes but could not be operable until the ships left the Lakes. In 1942, the United States, by then having entered the war and allied with Canada, successfully proposed that until the end of the war weapons could be completely installed and tested in the Lakes. After discussions in the Permanent Joint Board on Defense, in 1946, Canada similarly proposed to interpret the agreement as permitting using ships for training purposes if each country notified the other.

== Plaques ==
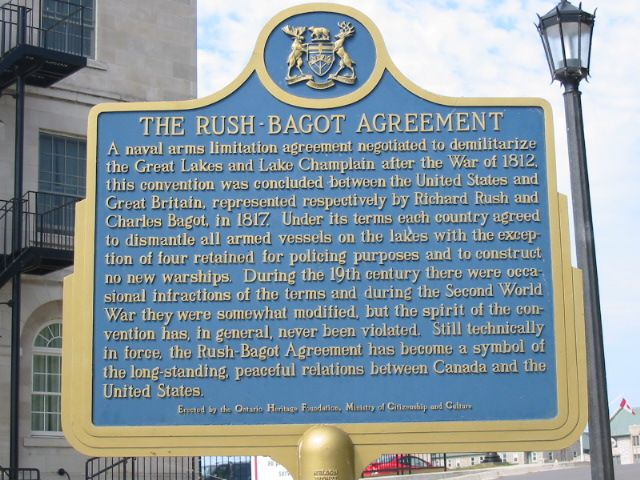
Rush–Bagot Treaty plaque at Kingston, Ontario

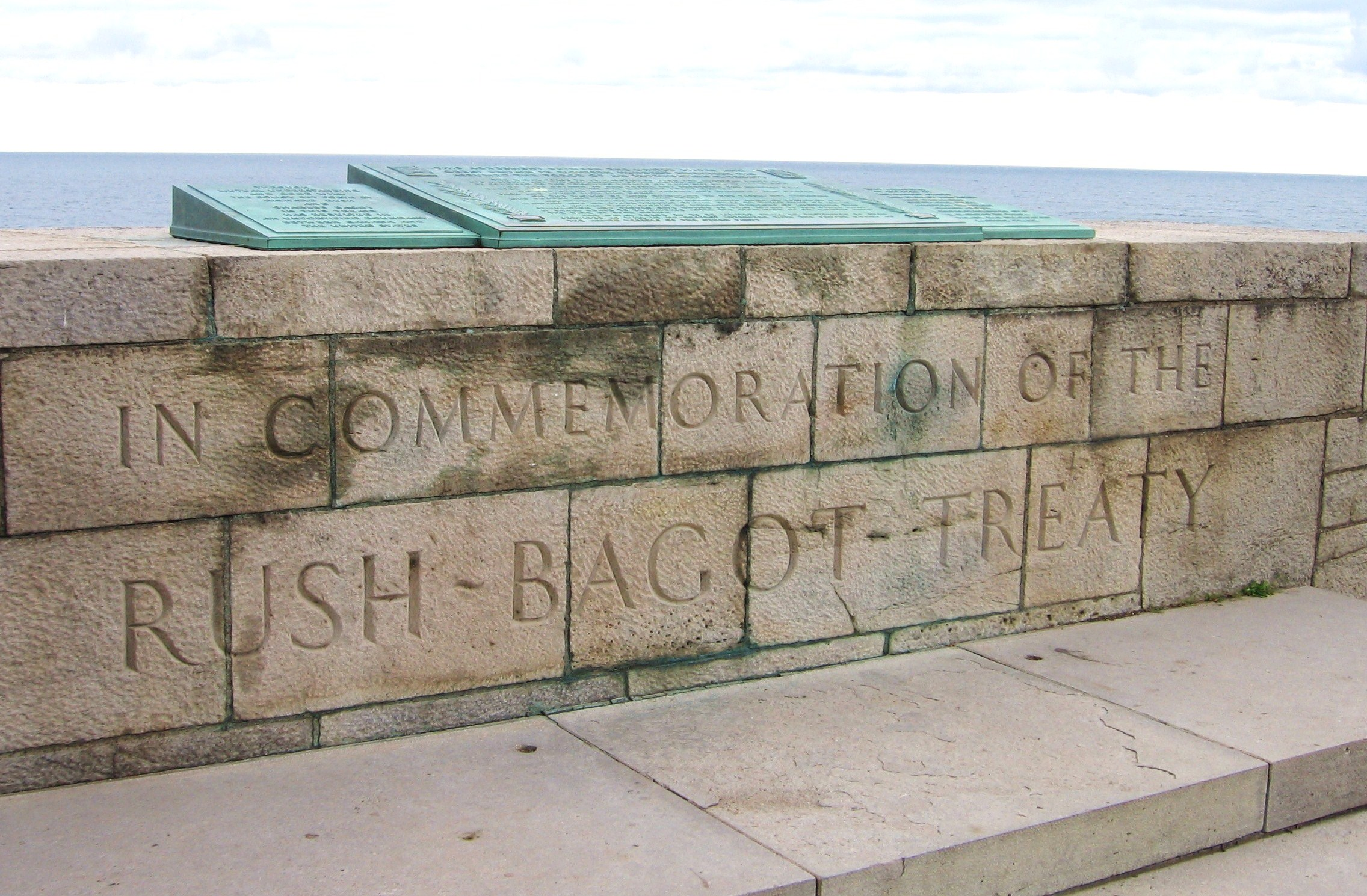
Memorial terrace to the Rush–Bagot Treaty at Old Fort Niagara

An Ontario Heritage Trust plaque in Kingston, Ontario recognizes the Rush–Bagot Agreement (44.229894°N 76.466292°W). A plaque also stands at the former site of the British Legation in Washington, D.C. (38°54′13.7″N 77°3′8.4″W) where the agreement was negotiated. A monument stands on the grounds of Old Fort Niagara as well (43.263347°N 79.063719°W), featuring reliefs of both Rush and Bagot, as well as the words of the treaty.
