= 133rd (Parachute) Field Ambulance =

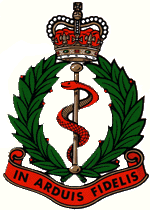
- Cap badge of the Royal Army Medical Corps
- Active: 1943–1945
- Country: United Kingdom
- Branch: British Army
- Type: Medical
- Role: Airborne forces
- Size: Field Ambulance
- Part of: 4th Parachute Brigade
- Engagements: Operation Slapstick; Battle of Arnhem; Operation Doomsday

Insignia
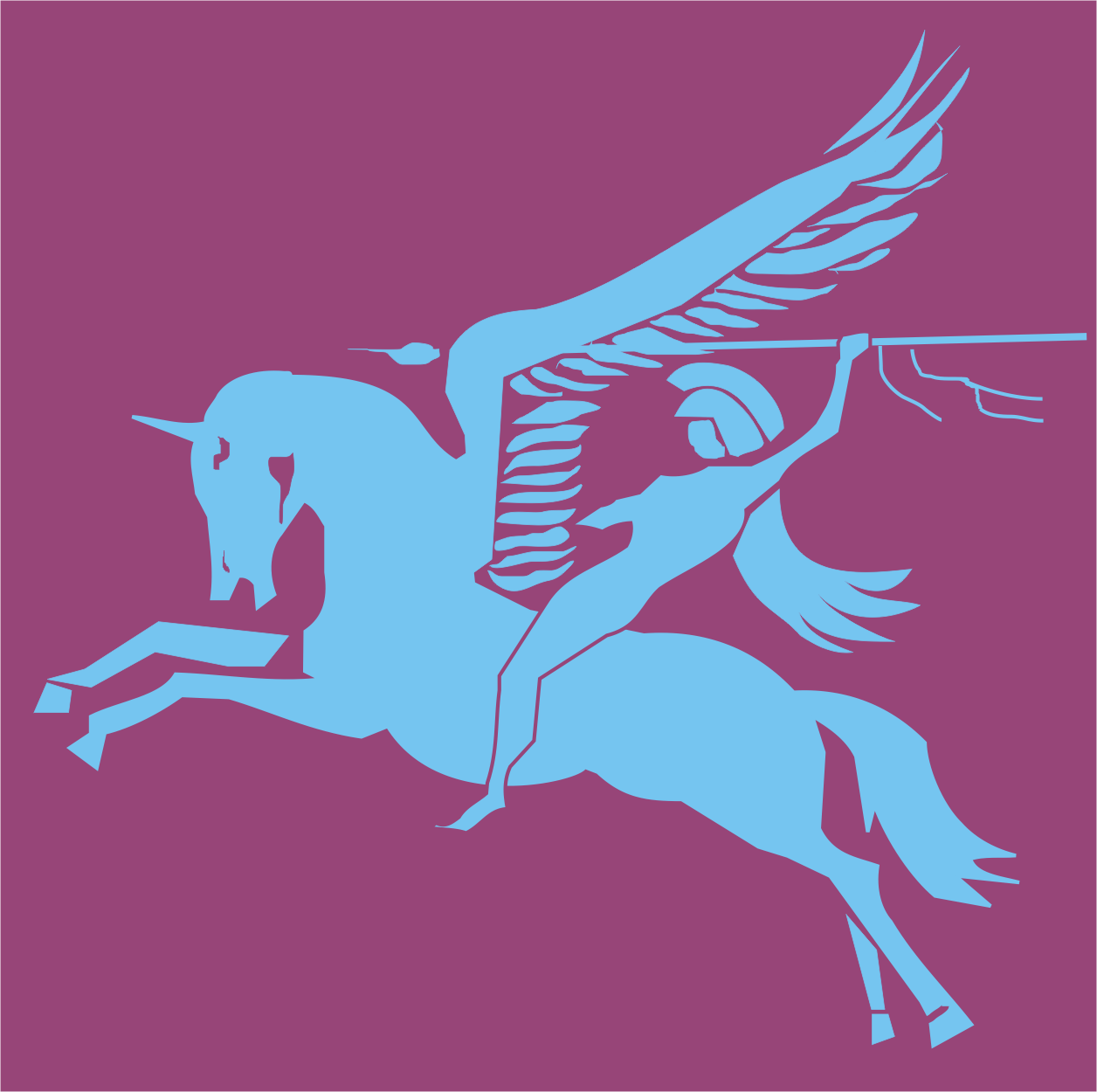
- The emblem of the Second World War British Airborne Forces, Bellerophon riding the flying horse Pegasus

The 133rd (Parachute) Field Ambulance was a Royal Army Medical Corps unit of the British Army's airborne forces during the Second World War.

The 133rd (Parachute) Field Ambulance was formed in Palestine in January 1943, by the conversion of the 133rd Field Ambulance to parachute duties. It was then assigned to the 4th Parachute Brigade, part of the 1st Airborne Division.

As part of the 1st Airborne Division it took part in Operation Slapstick, part of the Allied invasion of Italy. The unit returned to England at the end of 1943, to prepare for their next mission. That was operation Market Garden in the Netherlands. During the following battle of Arnhem, the division was destroyed only 2,100 men returning from the 10,000 that had started the mission. Amongst the men who remained behind from the 133rd were those men not already captured during the battle, who choose to remain behind with the wounded, becoming prisoners of war. Reformed after the battle the 133rd took part in Operation Doomsday in Norway after the end of the Second World War.

== Background ==
Impressed by the success of German airborne operations, during the Battle of France, the British Prime Minister, Winston Churchill, directed the War Office to investigate the possibility of creating a corps of 5,000 parachute troops. In September 1941 the 1st Parachute Brigade began forming, comprising three parachute infantry battalions. In keeping with British Army practice at the same time as the infantry battalions were forming, airborne supporting arms were formed including Royal Army Medical Corps volunteers. Of the seven airborne field ambulances formed during the Second World War, two were glider borne the 181st and the 195th. While the other five were parachute trained the 16th, 127th, 133rd, 224th and the 225th.

== 133rd (Parachute) Field Ambulance ==
Commanded by Lieutenant-Colonel W.C. Alford, the 133rd (Parachute) Field Ambulance was formed in Palestine in January 1943, by the conversion of the 133rd Field Ambulance to parachute duties. The Field Ambulance was assigned to the 4th Parachute Brigade. All members of the Field Ambulance had to undergo a twelve-day parachute training course carried out at No. 4 Parachute Training School RAF, in Palestine. Initial parachute jumps were from a converted barrage balloon and finished with five parachute jumps from an aircraft. (Note: Barrage balloons were used to speed up training jumps and meet the target of 5,000 trained parachutists.) Anyone failing to complete a descent was returned to his old unit. Those men who successfully completed the parachute course, were presented with their parachute wings. The 4th Parachute Brigade left Palestine on 26 May 1943, to join the 1st Airborne Division at Sousse in Tunisia. On arrival the men of the field ambulance were presented with their airborne forces maroon beret.

The war establishment of a Parachute Field Ambulance, was 177 all ranks. Consisting of thirteen doctors in two surgical teams and four sections. The doctors could deal with 330 cases in a twenty-four-hour period. Each surgical team could handle 1.8 operations an hour. However this was not sustainable and if they were required to operate the following day, the team had to be relieved after twelve hours. It was envisaged that during airborne operations, it would not be possible to evacuate casualties until the ground forces had linked up with them. To accommodate this the field ambulance had the ability to treat all types of wounds, and provide post operative care for up to fourteen days. (Note: Fourteen days was a medical, not tactical requirement. As casualties with abdominal wounds which had a thirty to forty per cent mortality rate, could not be moved before this.) They also had the transport required to evacuate casualties from the Regimental Aid Post (RAP), to the Main Dressing Station (MDS).

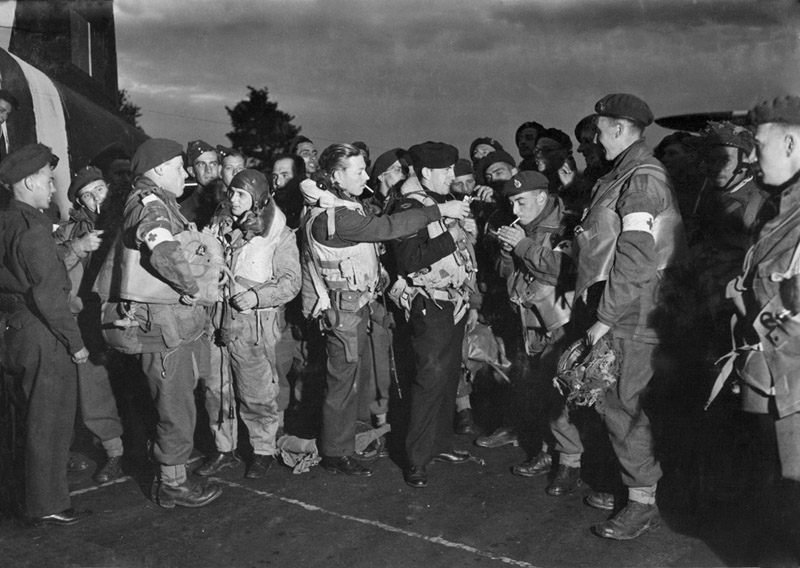
Parachute Field Ambulance troops just before boarding their aircraft.

An airborne field ambulance was commanded by a lieutenant-colonel, with a major as the second in command and a regimental sergeant major as the senior non commissioned rank. Headquarters staff included two specialist surgeons and a specialist anaesthetist, a pharmacist and an Army Dental Corps dentist. To assist in the operating theatre and with post operative care, there were six operating room assistants, a sergeant nursing orderly and six nursing orderlies. Other medical staff were a sergeant sanitary assistant, a masseur, a dental orderly and five stretcher bearers, one of whom was trained as a shoemaker. The rest of the headquarters consisted of a Quartermaster, clerks, cooks, storemen, an Army Physical Training Corps instructor, a barber and a joiner from the Royal Engineers.

There were four sub units of twenty men known as sections. Each section comprised an officer (doctor) and a staff sergeant (nursing orderly), under their command were three nursing orderlies, a clerk, a dutyman and thirteen stretcher bearers. A section was normally attached to a parachute battalion to supplement their own medical officer and medics. (Note: All the units in the brigades and division had a RAMC doctor and up to eighteen RAMC other ranks on their strength,)

The last component of the Field Ambulance was the Royal Army Service Corps detachment, commanded by a captain, with a company sergeant major as second in command. They had fifty men under them, an electrician, a clerk, thirty-eight drivers, four motorcyclists and five vehicle mechanics. It was normal to have at least two RASC drivers with two jeeps and a trailer attached to each section, the remaining men and vehicles stayed with the headquarters surgical teams.

Airborne operations were in their infancy in the Second World War and the British Army medical services had to design and develop a range of special medical airborne equipment. These included the Don pack, the Sugar pack, the folding airborne stretcher, the folding trestle table, the folding suspension bar, the airborne operating table, the airborne inhaler and special containers for blood and plasma.

== Operations ==
=== Italy ===
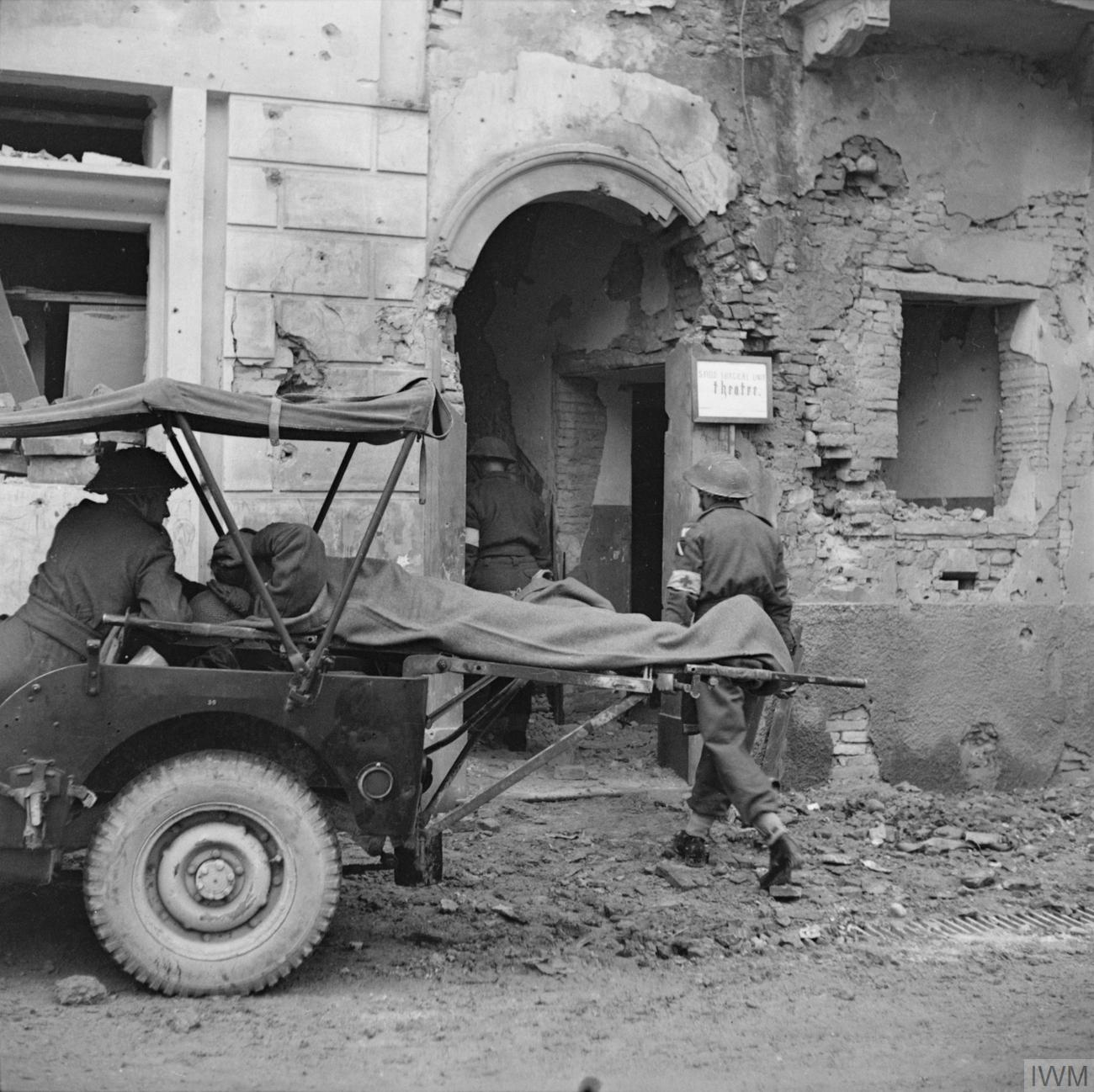
Ambulance jeep in Italy, fitted with stretchers for carrying wounded.

The first combat operation the 133rd (Parachute) Field Ambulance was involved in was Operation Slapstick, a landing at the port of Taranto during the Allied invasion of Italy in September 1943. Slapstick was in part a deception operation, to divert German forces away from the main Allied landings at Salerno (Operation Avalanche), which would be taking place on the same day and also an attempt to seize intact the ports of Taranto and Brindisi. The main advantage of Tranato was its large port. Positioned on the eastern side of the country, together with the expected capture of Naples in the west by the Americans, it would give the Allies two supply points, on opposite sides of the country.

The main part of the 1st Airborne Division sailed from North Africa for Taranto on 8 September 1943, landing on the 9/10 at Taranto unopposed. The 133rd after landing established their Main Dressing Station (MDS) with sixty beds at the Rendinella Hospital. The first casualties at the MDS were from the 156th Parachute Battalion following their capture of Mottola. By the 15 September the MDS was looking after sixty-seven wounded. In the first nine days of the operation the brigade had 101 casualties.

By 22 September the 133rd had taken over, 320 beds in the Rondinella Hospital (the size of a normal army general hospital) and as such was taken over by No. 70 General Hospital when they landed. On 30 September the 133rd moved to Gioia del Colle establishing a 140-bed MDS in a school. soon after the 1st Airborne Division was withdrawn back to England. While in Italy the division's field ambulances had treated 1,728 wounded and performed 194 surgeries.

=== Arnhem ===
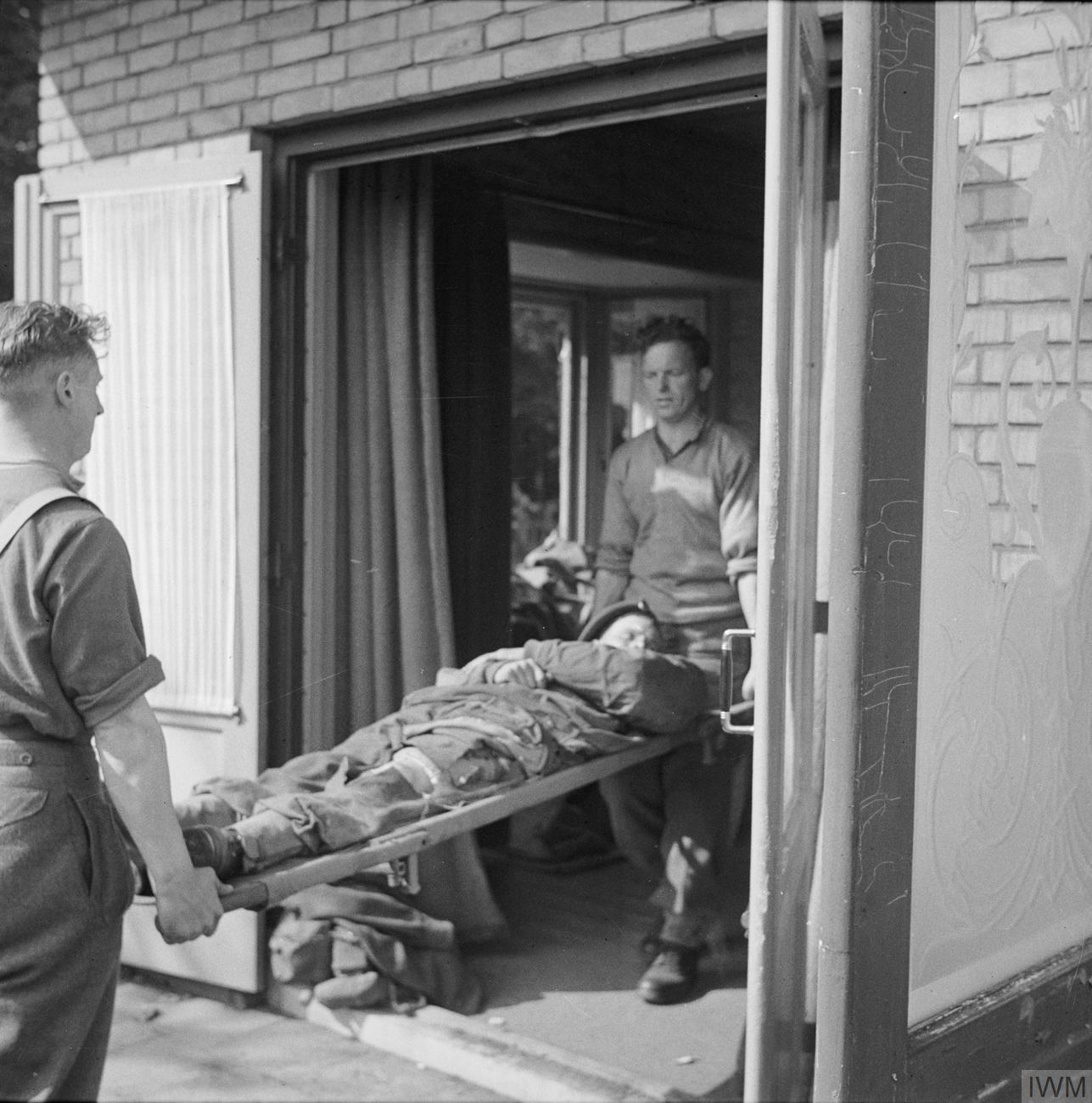
Stretcher bearers and casualty during the Battle of Arnhem.

The next mission the 133rd were involved with, was Operation Market Garden in September 1944. In particular the airborne assault to capture bridges crossing the River Rhine at Arnhem in the Netherlands. There was a shortage of transport aircraft, with three airborne divisions being deployed. So the 4th Parachute Brigade were on the second of what was supposed to be three lifts over three days. Only ten officers and 119 other ranks would go by air, the rest of the unit would join them by land when the Allied advance reached Arnhem. The plan called for the 133rd to join the 16th (Parachute) Field Ambulance who had landed the previous day, at the St Elizabeth Hospital in Arnhem.

On Monday 18 September 1944 the second day, 4th Parachute Brigade's lift of ninety-two C-47s (for the paratroops), forty-nine Horsa and nine Hamilcar gliders, were scheduled to arrive furthest away from Arnhem on Ginkel Heath drop zone 'Y', as early as possible on 18 September. Bad weather over England kept the second lift on the ground and the first troops did not arrive in the Netherlands until 15:00. The delay gave the Germans time to approach the northern landing grounds and engage the defenders from the 7th King's Own Scottish Borderers.

Landing under fire the 133rd were widely scattered and it was not until 20:30 that some non commissioned officers and men reached Wolfheze. By dawn 19 September, the two surgical teams and the majority of the unit had reached Wolfheze. Lieutenant-Colonel Alford decided to open a MDS where they were to support the brigade's advance towards the high ground north of Arnhem. By 19:30 Alford and forty-one other men, including the two surgical teams moved into Oosterbeek to establish a MDS, linking up with the 181st (Airlanding) Field Ambulance and started moving the less serious wounded to Oosterbeek. A German attack on Wolfheze early on 20 September, captured those men still in the village either treating or trying to move the wounded. All that now remained of the 133rd was the commanding officer, the two surgeons, the dental officer (who was also the anaesthetist) and ten other ranks. On the 20 September the 133rd opened a new dressing station about 100 yards (91 m) from the division's main MDS at the Hotel Taffelberg, by that evening there were around 1,000 wounded being treated by the divisions medical staff. Over the following days the dressing station was subjected to artillery and mortar fire. Then on the 24 September a local armistice was agreed and the majority of the division's walking wounded in the hospital area were evacuated leaving around 300 men who were unable to be moved. By the next day the shelling around the hospital area made it safer for the wounded to remain at their regimental aid posts, rather than take the risk of moving them. By that evening the hospitals had been overrun by the Germans. But 2,100 of the 10,000 men of the 1st Airborne Division were evacuated south of the River Rhine that night. However almost all the division's medical staff twenty-five officers and 400 other ranks had been taken prisoner.

=== Post war ===
The 133rd was reformed after Arnhem, and after he was released from custody at the end of the war Lieutenant-Colonel Alford was once more given command. The division never fought another battle in the war but was strong enough for Operation Doomsday the disarming and repatriation of the German forces occupying Norway. On 1 May 1945 the 133rd landed at Stavanger, then moved to Kristiansand taking over the St Joseph's hospital and other smaller hospitals at Evji Nlosen, Moi and Bergen. They were also made responsible for the medical care of 4,500 Russian prisoners of war in the area. The 133rd left Norway for England on 29 June and on 15 November was disbanded with the men not being demobbed sent to the division's other medical units.

== Notes ==
Footnotes

Citations
