= 181st (Airlanding) Field Ambulance =

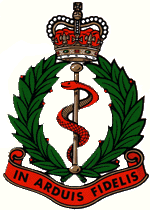
- Cap badge of the Royal Army Medical Corps
- Active: 1941–1945
- Country: United Kingdom
- Branch: British Army
- Type: Medical
- Role: Airborne forces
- Size: Field Ambulance
- Part of: 1st Airlanding Brigade
- Engagements: Operation Biting; Operation Ladbroke; Operation Slapstick; Battle of Arnhem; Operation Doomsday

Insignia
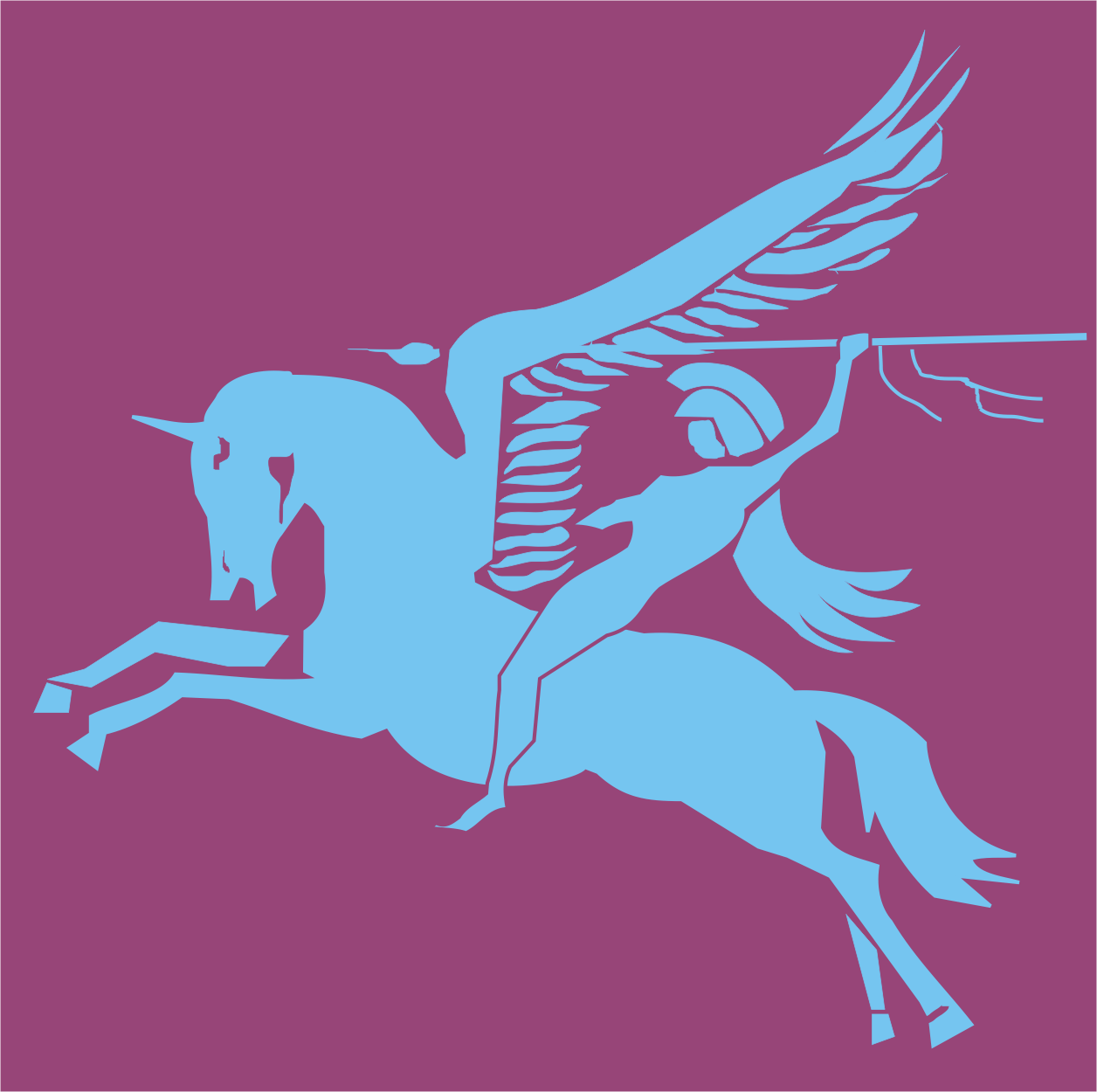
- Airborne forces emblem

The 181st (Airlanding) Field Ambulance was a Royal Army Medical Corps unit of the British airborne forces during the Second World War.

The Field Ambulance was assigned to the 1st Airlanding Brigade, the glider borne element of the 1st Airborne Division. Some men of the unit took part in the first parachute raid on the French coast in 1942. The unit then moved to Tunisia for operations in the Mediterranean theatre.

During Operation Ladbroke, part of the Allied invasion of Sicily, a shortage of gliders resulted in only six, instead of the required thirty, being allocate to the Field Ambulance. Of those six, only one reached land the others crashed into the sea. They were next deployed during the Allied invasion of Italy in Operation Slapstick. Soon afterwards the Field Ambulance returned to the United Kingdom, then in September 1944, they landed by glider in the Netherlands. In the battle of Arnhem the Field Ambulance remained behind with the wounded, and he majority of its men became prisoners of war.

The 181st (Airlanding) Field Ambulance was reformed after Arnhem, and were sent to Norway at the end of the war to assist in the repatriation of the German forces. The 1st Airborne Division including the 181st (Airlanding) Field Ambulance were disbanded after serving in Norway.

== Background ==
Impressed by the success of German airborne operations, during the Battle of France, the British Prime Minister, Winston Churchill, directed the War Office to investigate the possibility of creating a corps of 5,000 parachute troops. In September 1941 the 1st Parachute Brigade began forming, soon after followed by the glider borne 1st Airlanding Brigade and the 1st Airborne Division. In keeping with British Army practice at the same time as the infantry battalions were forming, airborne supporting arms were formed including Royal Army Medical Corps units. Of the seven airborne field ambulances formed during the Second World War, two were glider borne the 181st and the 195th. While the other five were parachute trained the 16th, 127th, 133rd, 224th and the 225th.

== 181st (Airlanding) Field Ambulance ==
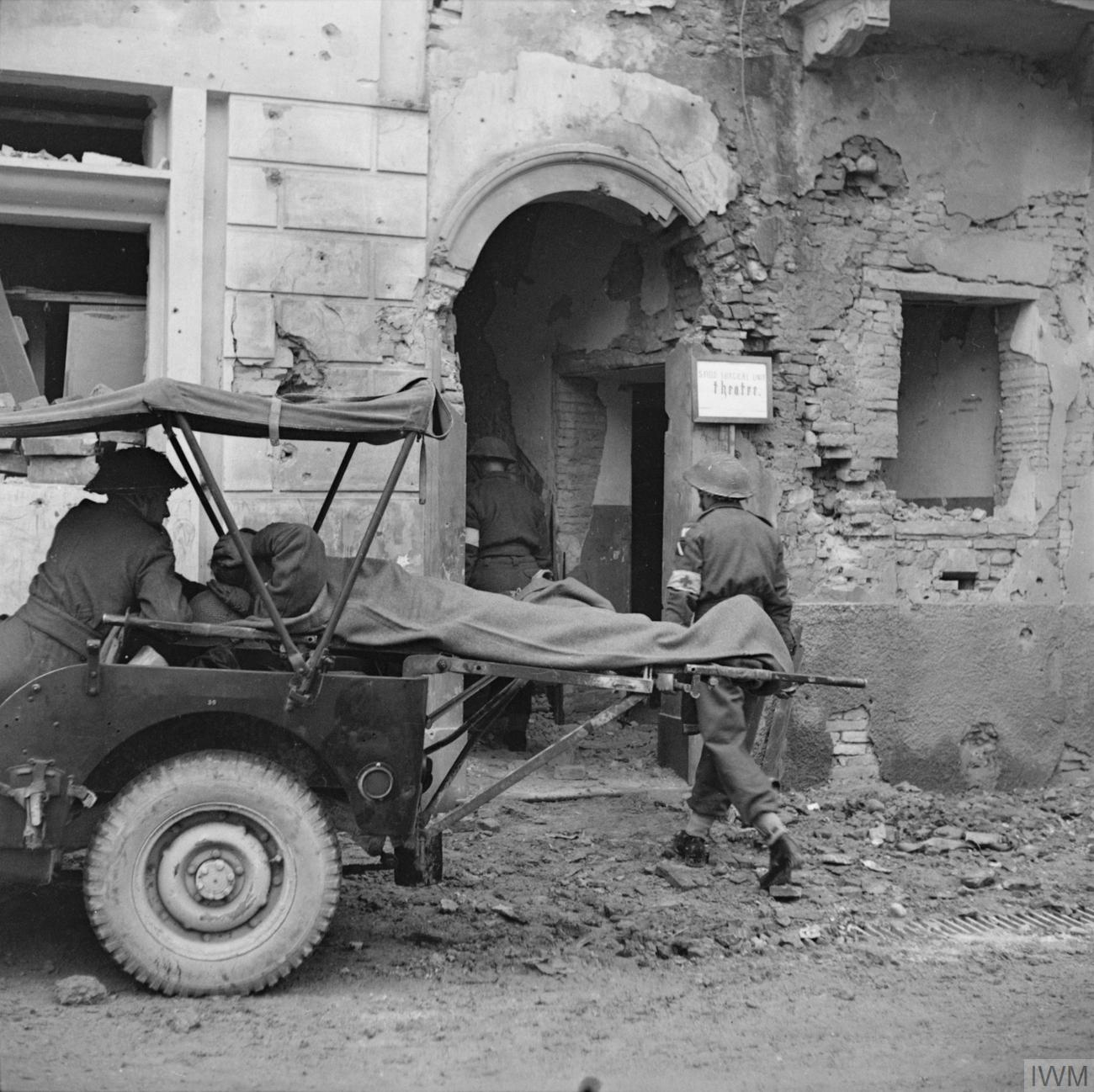
Ambulance jeep fitted with litters for carrying wounded.

The 181st (Airlanding) Field Ambulance was the first Royal Army Medical Corps airborne unit formed on 14 November 1941. It was raised from a cadre of the 132nd Field Ambulance and originally based in Llandysul but in December moved to Hungerford, and in May 1942 to Carter Barracks in Bulford. Once formed the 181st were assigned to the 1st Airlanding Brigade, part of the 1st Airborne Division. Airborne infantry platoons were required to march a distance of 50 miles (80 km) in 24 hours, and battalions 32 miles (51 km). The same stamina was expected of the Field Ambulance and in October 1942, they covered 31 miles (50 km) in eight and a half hours. The first commander was Lieutenant-Colonel Norman Gray Hill who was soon succeeded by Lieutenant-Colonel Graeme Matthew Warrack, and by January 1942, the 181st had an establishment of 234 all ranks. These were formed into two surgical teams and five sections. Together they were expected to deal with 330 patients in twenty-four hours. With the surgical teams completing 1.8 operations an hour, but if they were required to operate the following day, the team had to be relieved after twelve hours. A non-medical part of the field ambulance establishment was the Royal Army Service Corps detachment, commanded by a Captain, with seventy other ranks, the detachment provided the transport for the field ambulance and was composed of a combination of drivers, motorcyclists and vehicle mechanics.

=== France ===
The first parachute raid on the coast of France Operation Biting, was carried out by 'C' Company, 2nd Parachute Battalion commanded by Major John Frost. The raid entailed the parachute company being landed near Bruneval, secure and dismantle a German radar station, then be evacuated by sea. A section from 181st were selected to go on the raid, however they would travel across the English Channel by boat and not by air. (Note: The reason why 181st were selected and not the parachute trained 16th (Parachute) Field Ambulance which was part of the same brigade as the men on the raid is not known. Cherry 2009, p. 192 speculates that it was to demonstrate that other units in the division were ready for action.) The raid was of necessity a secret and the one officer and twenty men involved were told they were going on a training course in Scotland. The 181st section were accommodated on HMS Prins Albert, and practised for the mission on Loch Fyne in Assault landing craft (ALC). The operation took place over the night of 27–28 February 1942, it had been planned that the men of 181st would be landed to treat casualties, but this was not needed. The parachute company had six wounded men that were evacuated by the ALCs and treated by the 181st section. The wounds treated were all bullet wounds; two abdominal, one thigh, one foot, one scalp and one leg.

=== Sicily ===
On 5 March 1943, 181st were informed they would be moving overseas. After returning from embarkation leave on 15 May, the unit was sent to Tunisia for operations in the Mediterranean. On arrival they were billeted just outside Oran. But on 9 June moved to join the rest of 1st Airlanding Brigade at Froha. On 9 July 1943, only 2,075 men of the 1st Airlanding Brigade along with seven jeeps, six anti-tank guns and ten mortars, boarded their gliders in Tunisia and took off at 18:00 bound for Sicily. En route they encountered strong winds, poor visibility and at times were subjected to anti-aircraft fire. To avoid gunfire and searchlights, pilots of the towing aircraft climbed higher or took evasive action. In the confusion surrounding these manoeuvres, some gliders were released too early and sixty-five of them crashed into the sea, drowning around 252 men. The 181st required thirty-two Waco gliders for the mission, but with the overall shortage, they were only allocated six, and five of their gliders were amongst those that failed to reach Sicily and crashed into the sea.

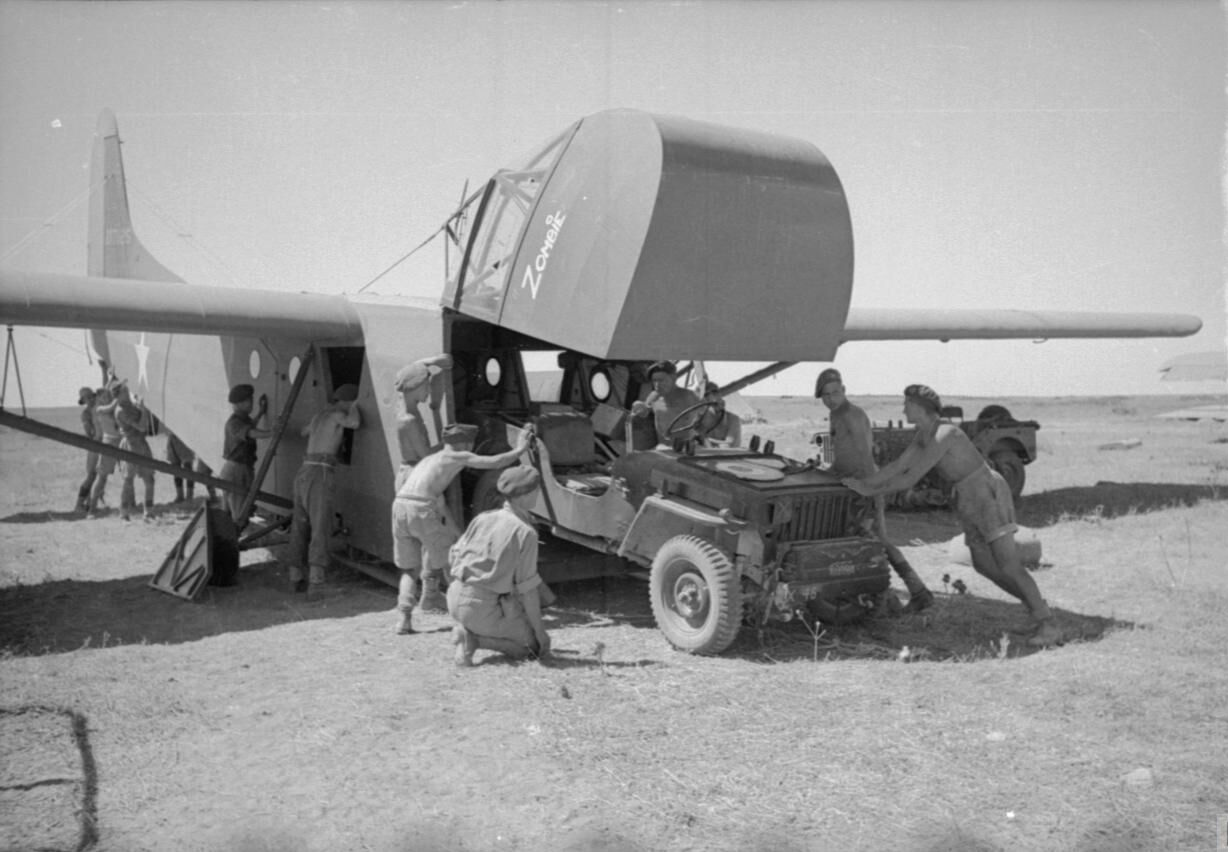
A jeep being loaded aboard a Waco glider in Tunisia before Operation Ladbroke.

The allocation of gliders does not correspond with the expected casualties for the mission of thirty per cent, suggested by the planners before they left Tunisia. The six gliders of the 181st, were loaded with two jeeps, a two stretcher trailer, two handcarts and three folding airborne bicycles and what medical stores they could take was in 25 pounds (11 kg) man portable packs. With the No. 1 Surgical Team and No. 5 Section s divided between the gliders. Space was found on the infantry battalions gliders for some of 181st units; No. 1 Section went in with the 1st Battalion, Border Regiment, While No. 2 Section went with the 2nd Battalion, South Staffordshire Regiment. The commanding officer Lieutenant-Colonel Warrack, the Regimental Sergeant Major and an orderly were able to go with brigade headquarters. In total only seventy-two from their establishment of 234 men were to go on the mission.

The only 181st glider to reach Sicily was the one carrying the majority of No. 1 Surgical Team, a surgeon, nine men with a handcart loaded with Don and Sugar packs. The glider had landed on the South Staffords landing zone south of their objective the Ponte Grande Bridge. The South Staffords had suffered the same fate as the 181st and instead of a battalion less than a company on troops landed and secured the bridge. The surgical team set out for the location designated their Main Dressing Station (MDS), a small village around 3 miles (4.8 km) away, en route picking up some wounded from the landings. On arrival at the village the surgical team started work, while a group of mixed troops from the brigade formed a road block, capturing forty Italian troops. Later around 15:00 the MDS was attacked by the Italians in about company strength and the men from the 181st had to assist in its defence using captured Italian weapons. After the attack was fought off, the medics then had to treat the casualties from both sides. The next day Lieutenant-Colonel Warrack (whose glider had also landed in the sea) arrived at the MDS with transport from the landing beaches to evacuate the wounded, the surgical team had by then conducted twenty-six surgeries in twenty-four hours. On 13 July the 181st left Sicily for Tunisia. The 181st losses during Operation Ladbroke were one officer and sixteen men who were all drowned when their gliders had crashed into the sea.

=== Italy ===
After Sicily the 1st Airlanding and 1st Parachute Brigade's casualties relegated them to the reserve for the initial landings in Operation Slapstick, the 1st Airborne Divisions part in the Allied invasion of Italy. The leading elements were drawn for the 2nd and 4th Parachute Brigades. They had to carry out an amphibious landing at the Italian port of Taranto. The landings on 9 September 1943, were unopposed, not least because the Italian Government had on the same day surrendered and the Germans did not have the forces in place to defend all the coastline.

The 1st Airlanding Brigade and the 181st did not come ashore at Taranto until 21 September and the next day took over the 200 bed Maritime Hospital, dealing with the divisions wounded for the next forty-eight hours, when they were relieved by an Indian unit. The airlanding brigade now moved into the front line and the 181st followed opening a MDS at Canossa and Cerignola on 25 and 26 September respectively. The unit was then separated during the advance with sections being attached to the 4th Armoured Brigade and the 78th Infantry Division. But by 30 September the division was withdrawn from the front line. During this time the 181st took over two small hospitals, one with thirty-nine beds at Putignano and the other with forty beds at Brindisi. The division was withdrawn back to England over the following months, the 181st leaving Taranto on 20 November 1943.

=== Arnhem ===
The 1st Airborne Division, was not involved in the Normandy landings and was next in action in Operation Market Garden and the Battle of Arnhem. The 181st would be on the first of three lifts spread over three days. Not everyone would be flying into Arnhem, some including most of the vehicles would come by land. The airborne party included the new commanding officer, Lieutenant-Colonel Arthur Marrable, another nine officers and 104 other ranks, however No. 5 Section with one officer and twenty-three men were the divisional reserve section. The divisions three field ambulances carried enough medical stores for forty-eight hours, and all the gliders were equipped with two folding airborne stretchers and extra blankets. As the airlanding brigade was the first unit to arrive, the 181st would establish a Main Dressing Station (MDS) at Wolfheze to treat any casualties from the landings. They would then move into Arnhem, to take over the municipal hospital. The reserve section was under control of division and was on standby to open an Air Casualty Evacuation Centre at Deelen airfield once that had been secured.

On 17 September on the first day of the operation, the 1st Airlanding Brigade, arrived in the Netherlands between 13:15 and 14:00 a full thirty minutes before the parachute troops. By 16:00 the 181st had established their MDS at Wolfheze and were taking in casualties from the landings. Overnight they conducted eight surgical operations and were treating another sixty men who had been wounded. Casualties in the division were mounting and by 08:00 the following morning the MDS had admitted 180 men. At 17:00 the unit received orders to move closer to Arnhem, and moved into the Hotel Schoonhord on the main road at Oosterbeek. A second position at the Hotel Taffelberg, around 200 yards (180 m) away was fitted out for the surgical teams. Casualties were mounting and as the only firmly established MDS most of them arrived at Oosterbeek to be treated by the 181st. The situation was becoming serious and more buildings were taken over by the MDS including a large house belonging to Kate ter Horst, and the local school Having remained at Wolfheze with the wounded unable to be moved, the reserve No, 5 Section left to join the rest of the 181st at 20:30 19 September with the casualties that were able to be moved. By this time the 16th (Parachute) Field Ambulance in Arnhem had been captured by the Germans and the 1st Parachute Brigade units trying to fight through to the bridge, were sending their casualties to the 181st at Oosterbeek.

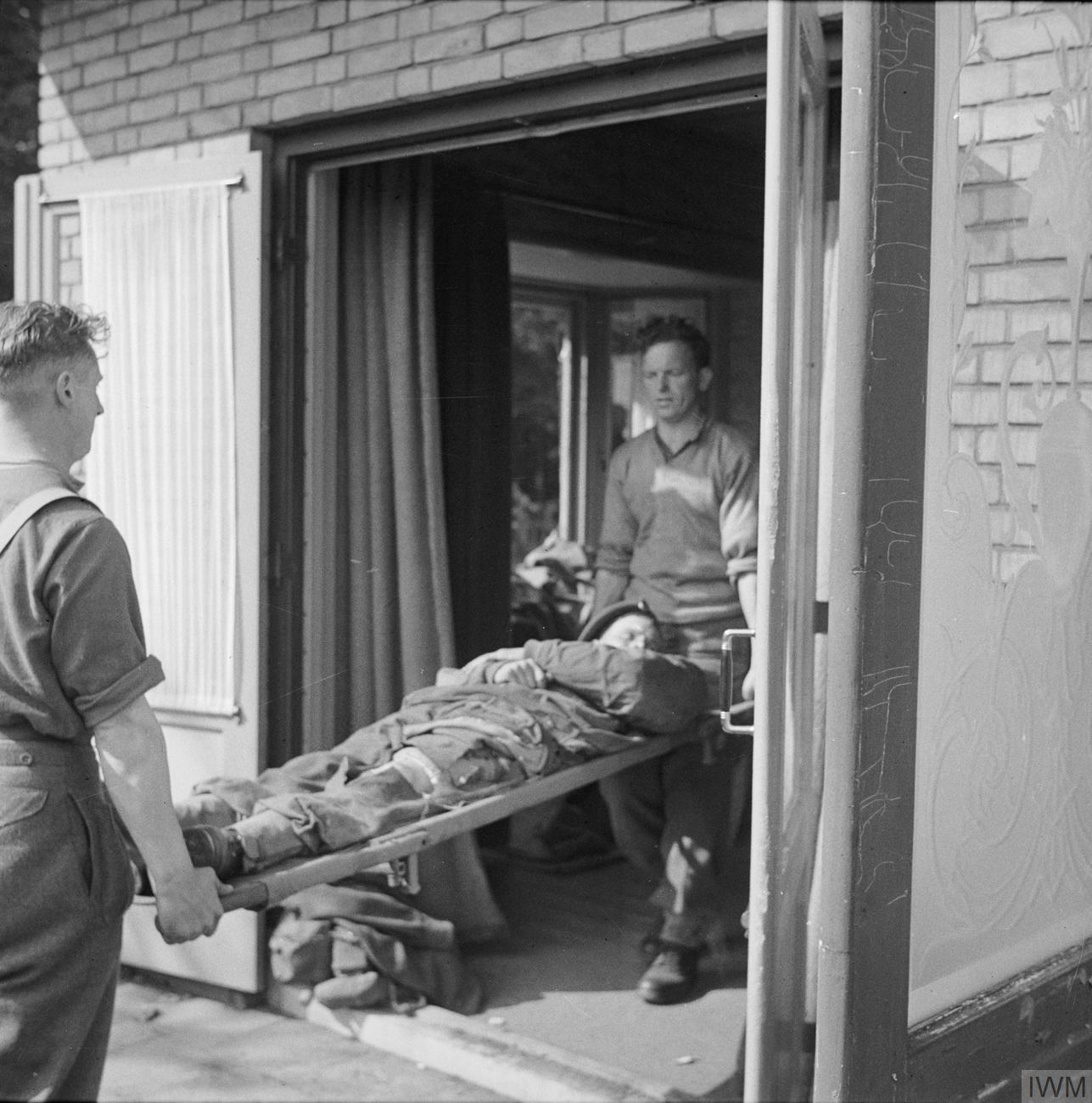
Stretcher bearers and casualty during the Battle of Arnhem.

By 20 September day four of the operation, the divisions medical services at Oosterbeek consisted of the 181st, and around forty men including the two surgical teams from the 133rd (Parachute) Field Ambulance of the 4th Parachute Brigade. However, during a German assault at 10:00 one of the outlying dressing stations with around 400 wounded, manned by the survivors of 133rd was captured. The walking wounded and most of the medics, excepting the surgical teams were taken away as prisoners of war At the Hotel Schoonhord the MDS was subjected to mortaring and some of the 300 casualties there were wounded for a second time, and the hotel was also captured. The surgical teams at the Taffelberg had continued to operate through the bombardment. But by 15:00 the surgical teams and No. 5 Section which were the only part of the MDS that had not been captured by the advancing Germans. That evening a counter-attack by the 4th Parachute Brigade liberated the Hotel Schoonhord and some of the remaining wounded were moved further inside the divisional perimeter.

The following day 21 September No. 5 Sections dressing station with around 100 lightly wounded, was caught in a cross-fire killing the section commander and five medics, as soon as the shooting died down, they evacuated the station and set up in the grounds of the Horst house. By that evening the dwindling medical services around the MDS were dealing with over 1,000 casualties. At 17:00 having completed sixty operations, the two surgical teams from the 181st were forced to stop, when the ceilings in the operating rooms collapsed during an artillery bombardment.

The MDS at the Schoonhord was again captured by the Germans in the early hours of 22 September. The other nine buildings being used by the medics were by now, almost constantly under fire, and unable to be evacuated many of the wounded were killed in their beds. Orders were issued that the wounded would have to remain at battalion aid posts, as moving them to the MDS was impossible in the circumstances. By now food and water supplies were running out, to solve the water shortage, central heating systems were drained and the Dental Officer shot two sheep with a borrowed sten gun to help feed the wounded.

On 24 September a truce was arranged with the Germans and hundreds of the divisions wounded were evacuated by the Germans to Arnhem. The Germans took the opportunity to move their troops into the area of the Schoonhord, and in an attack after the truce many of the wounded and medics at the Taffelberg were killed or wounded again, including some German troops who were sheltering in the grounds. By 18:00 that evening the Schoonhord which had had all the wounded evacuated was once more filled with the divisions wounded. The stretcher bearers of the 181st moved the remaining wounded into the building, in preparation for the divisions withdrawal south of the River Rhine that night.

On 25 September the Germans moved into Oosterbeek and at 18:00 the remaining wounded had been evacuated to Arnhem or Apeldoorn, together with the survivors from the 181st. Altogether twenty-five doctors and 400 RAMC other ranks from the 1st Airborne Division, stayed with their patients and became prisoners of war. Of the men of the 181st who had landed in the Netherlands, only ten of them were evacuated south of the Rhine.

=== Norway ===
Using the few men that returned from the battle of Arnhem, the rear party of the seaborne tail and volunteers from other units, 181st (Airlanding) Field Ambulance was reformed on 1 March 1945, under the command of Lieutenant-Colonel I.C. Gilliland. However, by this stage in the war the 1st Airborne Division still reforming was not used in combat again. Instead following the surrender of the German occupation troops in Norway the division was sent there on 9 May 1945. The 181st left England on 11 May and landed at Oslo that evening, establishing a hospital at Nordstrand. As well as supervising the German surrender the medics were also responsible for treating the numerous ex Russian prisoners of war. Some of the 181st accompanied the Russians to their homeland, becoming the first British Army troops to set foot in northern Russia since 1919. On 3 September 1945, the 181st left Oslo and on their arrival in England were quartered near Tidworth Camp, until 14 November 1945, 181st (Airlanding) Field Ambulance was disbanded.

== Notes ==
Footnotes

Citations
