= 224th (Parachute) Field Ambulance =

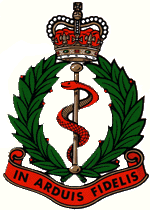
- Cap badge of the Royal Army Medical Corps
- Active: 1942–1948
- Country: United Kingdom
- Branch: British Army
- Type: Medical
- Role: Airborne forces
- Size: Field Ambulance
- Part of: 3rd Parachute Brigade
- Engagements: Normandy landings Rhine crossing

Insignia
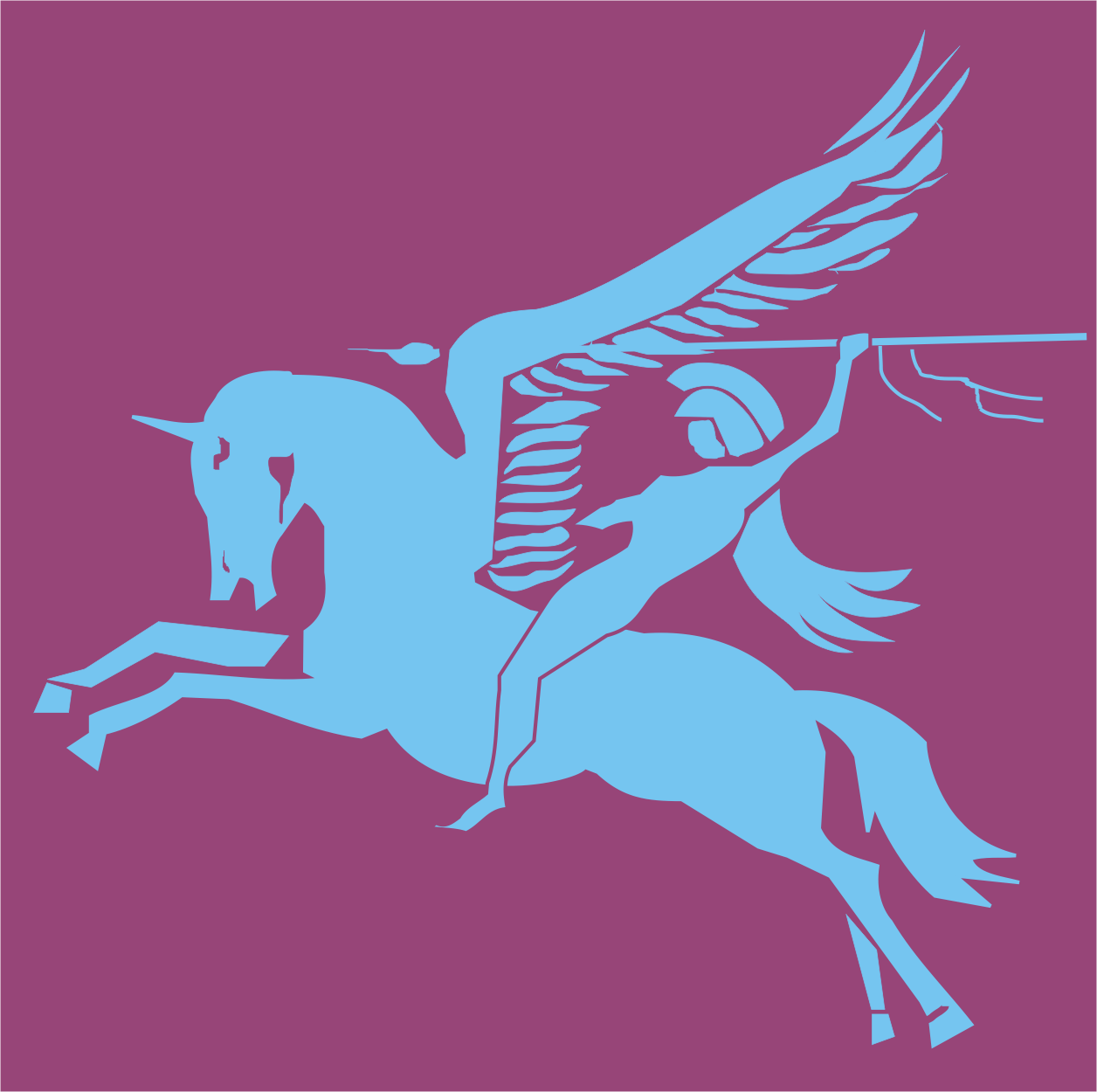
- Emblem of the British airborne forces

The 224th (Parachute) Field Ambulance was a Royal Army Medical Corps unit of the British airborne forces during the Second World War.

The 224th Field Ambulance was converted to an airborne unit in 1942, and assigned to the 3rd Parachute Brigade, part of the 6th Airborne Division. They first saw active service in 1944 during the invasion of Normandy, and remained in France until September. They were then withdrawn back to England only to return to the continent at the end of the year in response to the German surprise winter offensive in the Ardennes forest. Their final mission of the war was the airborne assault over the River Rhine in 1945. They remained in Germany until the final surrender in May that year.

After the war the 224th remained with the 6th Airborne Division, and following a brief period in England were sent to Mandate Palestine on an internal security role. In 1948, the field ambulance and most of the division was disbanded.

== Background ==
Impressed by the success of German airborne operations, during the Battle of France, the British Prime Minister, Winston Churchill, directed the War Office to investigate the possibility of creating a corps of 5,000 parachute troops. In September 1941 the 1st Parachute Brigade began forming, comprising three parachute infantry battalions. In keeping with British Army practice at the time, airborne supporting arms were created, including Royal Army Medical Corps volunteers. Of the seven airborne field ambulances formed during the Second World War, two were glider borne the 181st and the 195th. While the other five were parachute trained the 16th, 127th, 133rd, 224th and the 225th.

== 224th (Parachute) Field Ambulance ==
The 224th (Parachute) Field Ambulance was formed in December 1942, by the conversion of the 224th Field Ambulance to parachute duties. Once converted, they were assigned to the 3rd Parachute Brigade in the 6th Airborne Division. The war establishment of a parachute field ambulance was 177 all ranks, consisting of thirteen doctors in two surgical teams and four sections. The doctors could deal with 330 cases in a twenty-four-hour period. Each surgical team could handle 1.8 operations an hour. This rate could not be sustained and if they were required to operate the following day, the team had to be relieved after twelve hours.

The 224th Parachute Field Ambulance was commanded by Lieutenant-Colonel Alistair Young, with a major as the second in command and a regimental sergeant major as the senior non-commissioned rank. Headquarters staff included two specialist surgeons and a specialist anaesthetist, a pharmacist and an Army Dental Corps dentist. To assist in the operating theatre and with post operative care, there were six operating room assistants, a sergeant nursing orderly and six nursing orderlies. Other medical staff were a sergeant sanitary assistant, a masseur, a dental orderly and five stretcher bearers, one of whom was trained as a shoemaker. The rest of the headquarters consisted of a quartermaster, clerks, cooks, storemen, an Army Physical Training Corps instructor, a barber and a joiner from the Royal Engineers.

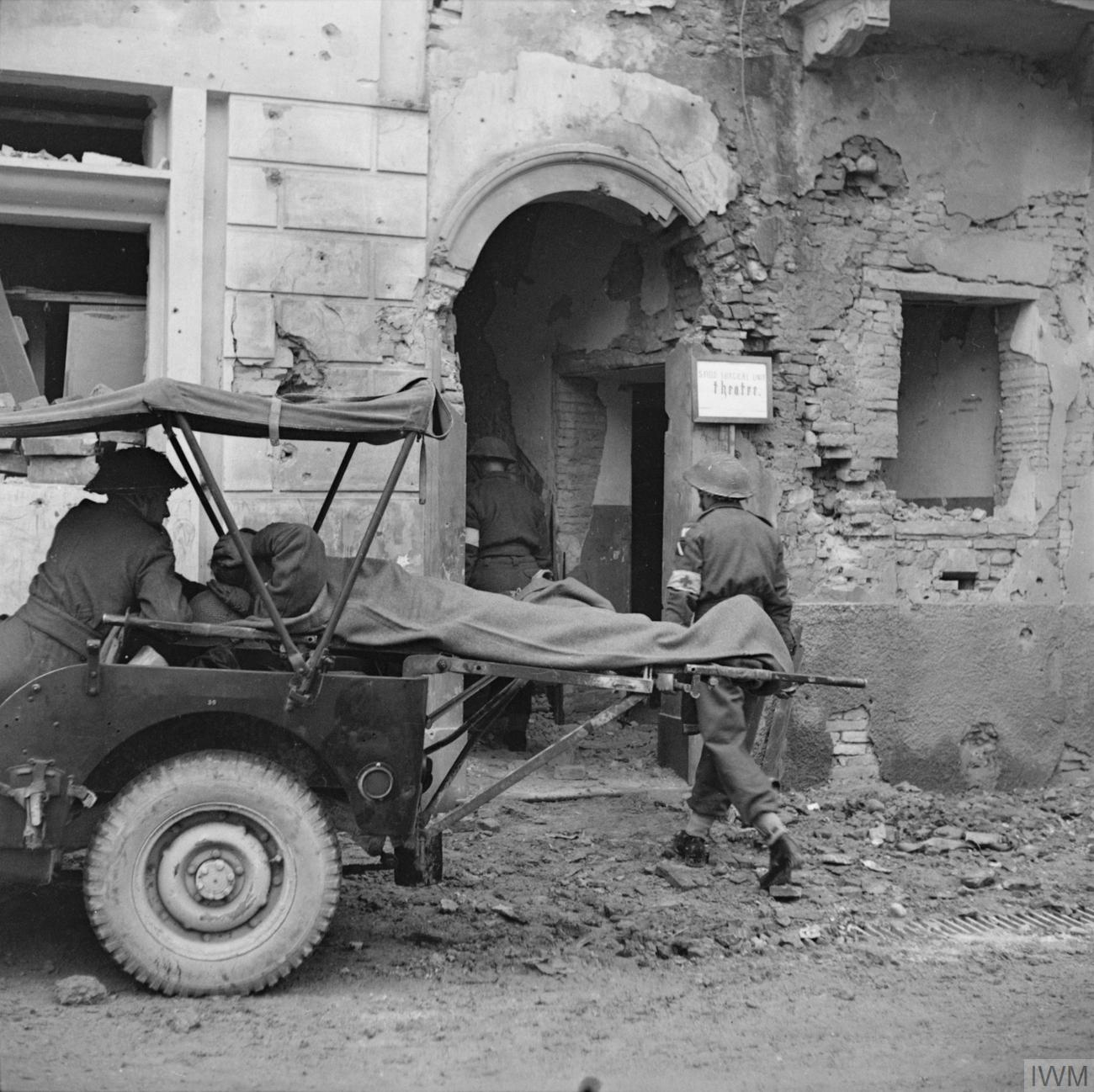
Jeep fitted with litters for carrying wounded.

There were four sub units of twenty men known as sections. Each section comprised an officer (doctor) and a staff sergeant (nursing orderly), under their command were three nursing orderlies, a clerk, a dutyman and thirteen stretcher bearers. A section was normally attached to a parachute battalion to supplement their own medical officer and medics. (Note: Each battalion had a RAMC doctor and eighteen RAMC other ranks on their strength.)

The last component of the Field Ambulance was the Royal Army Service Corps detachment, commanded by a captain, with a company sergeant major as second in command. They had fifty men under them, an electrician, a clerk, thirty-eight drivers, four motorcyclists and five vehicle mechanics. It was normal to have at least two RASC drivers with two jeeps and a trailer attached to each section, the remaining men and vehicles stayed with the headquarters surgical teams.

All members of the Field Ambulance had to undergo a twelve-day parachute training course carried out at No. 1 Parachute Training School, RAF Ringway. Initial parachute jumps were from a converted barrage balloon and finished with five parachute jumps from an aircraft. (Note: Barrage balloons were used to speed up training jumps and meet the target of 5,000 trained parachutists.) Anyone failing to complete this training was returned to his old unit. Those men who successfully completed the parachute course, were presented with their maroon beret and parachute wings.

== Operations ==
=== Normandy ===
On 6 June 1944, the 6th Airborne Division took part in Operation Tonga during the Normandy landings. The 3rd Parachute Brigade landed on their own drop zone to the north-east of Ranville. The brigade had to capture two bridges crossing the Caen Canal and the River Orne and hold them until relieved by forces advancing from the British Sword Beach. At the same time, they had to secure the landing zone for the divisions glider-borne forces arriving later that day.

The 224th commanded by Lieutenant-Colonel D.H. Thompson was divided into groups for the landings. The commanding officer and sixty-five men who were to establish the Main Dressing Station (MDS) travelled in the same aircraft as brigade headquarters, while Nos 1, 2 and 3 Sections were attached to the 1st Canadian, 8th and 9th parachute battalions. (Note: All of No. 3 Section attached to the 9th Parachute Battalion, became casualties in the battle to capture the Merville Gun Battery.) Arriving in Normandy from around 01:00, many of the unit landed too far to the east in the flooded marshes beside the River Dives. One of those men was the commanding officer who then spent three weeks trying to rejoin the unit from behind German lines before being captured. The members of the 224th who landed on the correct drop zone proceeded to set up their Main Dressing Station in a farm at Le Mesnil. By noon, around two-thirds of the 22nd were still missing, but the MDS had managed to treat fifty-five wounded and conduct ten surgical operations.

The following day, the Germans counter-attacked and the MDS was surrounded on three sides with the nearest German forces only 300 yards (270 m) away, but they kept on operating. Over the next few days, the front line was very fluid and it was not unknown for the unit's ambulances returning to the MDS from battalion aid posts to drive through German patrols and positions. Being co-located with brigade headquarters, the MDS could not be given the protection of the Red Cross and was subjected to small arms and artillery fire. It was also twice attacked by Royal Air Force rocket firing Typhoons. On 18 June during a German artillery attack, all the unit's transport, apart from one ambulance jeep and two captured trucks, were destroyed. After the last attack, Brigade headquarters issued orders for the MDS to move further to the rear at Ecarde. Between 6 and 19 June, the MDS had treated 800 wounded and carried out 112 surgical operations.

The 224th remained at Ecarde until the first week in August. During their time there, they established a divisional clinic and assisted with the casualties from the British attempts to capture Caen. On 7 August, they moved closer to the front at Riverbella when the 6th Airborne Division was ordered to cross the River Dives and advance north along the French coast. The 224th and the division's two other field ambulances leap-frogged each other to keep up with the leading troops and have at least one MDS open for casualties. By the end of the month, the division had reached the River Seine. They were ordered to halt and by September had been withdrawn back to England. While in Normandy, the division's three medical units had treated 6,722 casualties.

=== Germany ===
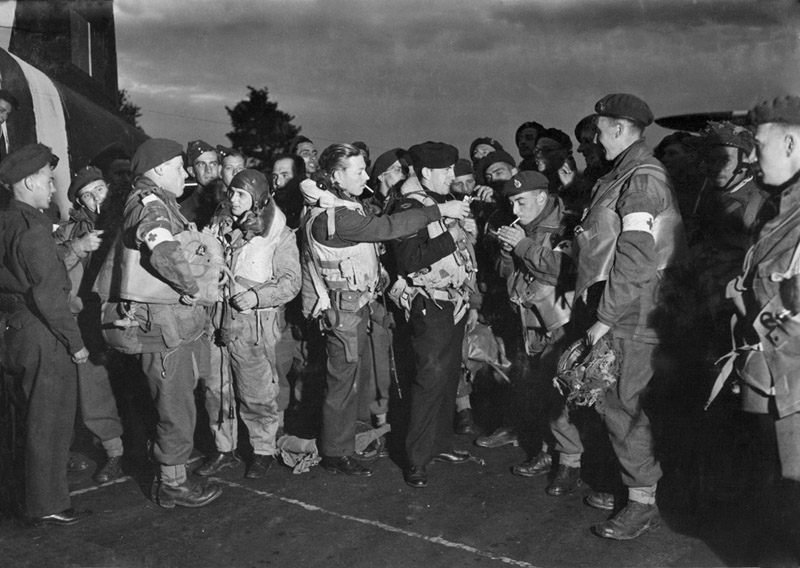
Parachute Field Ambulance troops just before boarding their aircraft.

The next airborne operation the 224th was involved in was Operation Varsity the crossing of the River Rhine in March 1945. The divisions drop zones were on the high ground to the east of Hamminkeln. As this was the first airborne operation in daylight without the element of surprise, the 224th were warned to expect around 600 casualties. The 224ths airborne contingent was transported across the Rhine, in seven aircraft and three gliders. The flight was successful apart from one glider having to land in France when its tow rope snapped. The rest of the 224th landing under fire had four men killed and a number wounded by the German machine guns. Still under the German guns, they started clearing the casualties from the drop zone. At midday brigade headquarters ordered the 224th move to Bergerfurth, where they established the MDS in the village church. Casualties continued to mount and the supply of stretchers was exhausted. Two of the unit's stretcher bearers were awarded the Military Medal, for returning to the landing zone which was still under fire, to retrieve stretchers from the crashed gliders. It was around the same time that Corporal Frederick Topham was awarded the Victoria Cross. Two medics had been killed trying to assist a wounded man on the drop zone. Topham left cover to help, he was wounded in the face but succeeded in carrying the casualty to safety. By the end of the first day the 224th had seven dead, nine wounded and seven missing. They had treated 212 wounded and conducted nine surgical operations. The ground forces caught up with the 6th Airborne division on 24 March and by 2 May the division had advanced 330 miles (530 km) across Germany to Wismar on the Baltic Sea. From then to the end of the war a week later the 224th remained static treating wounded soldiers, civilians and ex prisoners of war. They also provided a medical team to treat the survivors from the Bergen-Belsen concentration camp.

=== Palestine ===
After the Second World War, the 6th Airborne Division was named the Imperial Strategic Reserve in the Middle East. The division moved to Palestine between 15 September and 6 November 1945. The 224th landed at the port of Haifa on 3 October. The 3rd Parachute Brigade was deployed to the Lydda district with responsibility for Tel-Aviv and Jaffa. The division was actively involved in peacekeeping and supporting the civil power. On 22 September 1946, Thomas Mcinnes of Liverpool aged 20 a junior NCO from the 224th was one of the forty men from the division killed in Palestine. In 1947, the unit was renumbered the 16th (Parachute) Field Ambulance, taking the number of the original parachute medical formation, which had been disbanded in 1945. Order for the disbandment of the 6th Airborne Division were issued and on 7 April 1948, the 16th (Parachute) Field Ambulance left Palestine for England, where they were re-rolled, becoming a standard field ambulance formation.

== Notes ==
Footnotes

Citations
