= 225th (Parachute) Field Ambulance =

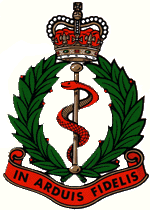
- Cap badge of the Royal Army Medical Corps
- Active: 1943–1946
- Country: United Kingdom
- Branch: British Army
- Type: Medical
- Role: Airborne forces
- Size: Field Ambulance
- Part of: 5th Parachute Brigade
- Engagements: Operation Tonga; Operation Varsity; Operation Tiderace

Insignia
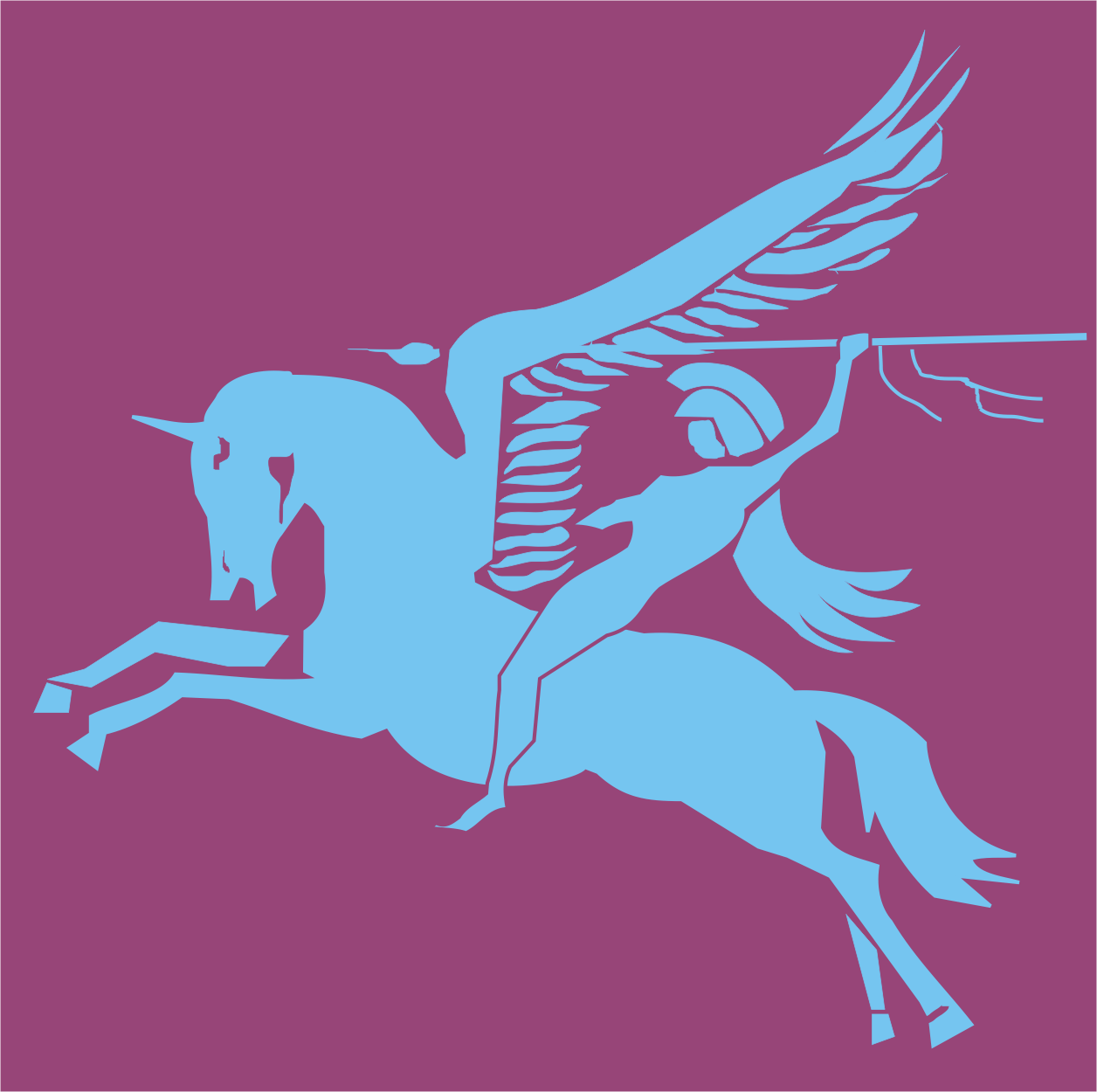
- Emblem of the British Airborne Forces

The 225th (Parachute) Field Ambulance was a Royal Army Medical Corps unit of the British airborne forces during the Second World War.

When raised the Field Ambulance was assigned to the 5th Parachute Brigade, which was part of the 6th Airborne Division. As such they participated in Operation Tonga, part of the Normandy landings. The unit remained in France until September 1944, when they were withdrawn back to England to rest and rebuild. They then took part in the last and largest airborne mission in the war, Operation Varsity, the River Rhine crossing in 1945.

After the war in Europe ended they were sent to the Far East for operations against the Japanese however the war ended before they could be deployed. Instead they were sent to Malaya and Singapore to assist in the restoration of British control. Later in the year they were sent to Java, where the brigade had to maintain law and order until a Dutch force could arrive to relieve them. The Field Ambulance then returned to Singapore, for a short time before leaving to rejoin the 6th Airborne Division, now serving in Palestine. However shortly after arriving the 225th (Parachute) Field Ambulance was disbanded.

== Background ==
Impressed by the success of German airborne operations, during the Battle of France, the British Prime Minister, Winston Churchill, directed the War Office to investigate the possibility of creating a corps of 5,000 parachute troops. In September 1941 the 1st Parachute Brigade began forming, comprising three parachute infantry battalions. In keeping with British Army practice at the same time as the infantry battalions were forming, airborne supporting arms were formed including Royal Army Medical Corps volunteers. Of the seven airborne field ambulances formed during the Second World War, two, the 181st and the 195th, were glider borne, while the other five, the 16th, 127th, 133rd, 224th and the 225th, were parachute trained.

=== 225th (Parachute) Field Ambulance ===
On 7 June 1943 the 225th (Parachute) Field Ambulance was raised at Castle Cary, using the number 225 from a disbanded unit from the Guards Armoured Division. On formation the Field Ambulance was assigned to the 5th Parachute Brigade, initially in the 1st Airborne Division and later the 6th Airborne Division. The war establishment of a parachute field ambulance, consisted of 177 all ranks. With nine doctors in two surgical teams and four sections. Together they could deal with 330 cases in twenty-four hours. With the surgical teams completing 1.8 operations an hour, but if they were required to operate the following day had to be relieved after twelve hours.

It was commanded by a Lieutenant-Colonel, with a Major second in command and a Regimental Sergeant Major as the senior non-commissioned rank. Medical staff included two specialist surgeons and a specialist anaesthetist, a pharmacist and a Royal Army Dental Corps (RADC) Dentist. To assist with operations there were six operating room assistants, a sergeant nursing orderly and six nursing orderlies. Other medical staff were a sergeant sanitary assistant, a masseur, a RADC orderly. These were assisted by five stretcher bearers, one of whom was trained as a shoemaker. The rest of the headquarters consisted of a Quartermaster, clerks, cooks, storemen, an Army Physical Training Corps instructor and a barber. The four sections each comprised an officer (Doctor) in command and a staff sergeant (nursing orderly) second in command. Three nursing orderlies, a clerk, a dutyman and thirteen stretcher bearers. The last component of the Field Ambulance was the Royal Army Service Corps detachment, commanded by a Captain, with a Company Sergeant Major as second in command. They had fifty men under them, including thirty-eight drivers, four motorcyclists and five vehicle mechanics.

== Operational history ==
=== Normandy ===
On 6 June 1944, the 6th Airborne Division, took part in Operation Tonga during the Normandy landings. The 5th Parachute Brigade landed on their own drop zone to the north-east of Ranville. The brigade had to capture two bridges crossing the Caen Canal and the River Orne and hold them until relieved by forces advancing from the British Sword Beach. At the same time they had to secure the landing zone for the division's glider borne forces arriving later that day.

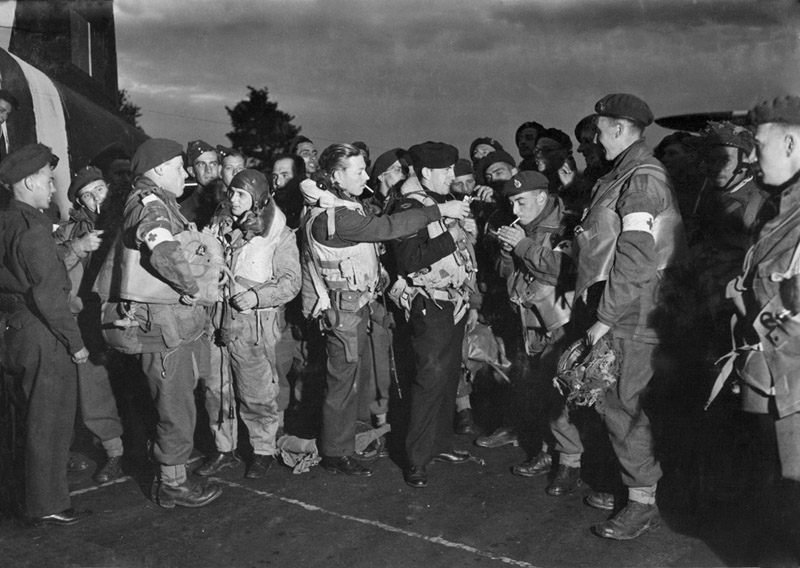
Parachute Field Ambulance troops just before boarding their aircraft.

Under the command of Lieutenant-Colonel Bruce Harvey, the 225th (Parachute) Field Ambulance, landing with the brigade were to establish their Main Dressing Station (MDS) at Le Bas de Ranville. Leaving England at 23:45 5 June, the aircraft carrying the field ambulance troops crossed the French coast at from 01:00 the unit started landing in Normandy. Unlike other units involved that night by 02:30 most of the unit had arrived at their rendezvous, which was under German mortar fire. Following at the rear of the 12th (Yorkshire) Parachute Battalion, they arrived at Le Bas de Ranville. The MDS was established in a Chateau called Chateau de Guernon-Ranville by 04:00 and within half an hour the first of the brigades casualties arrived. During the morning the RACS, commander captured a German supply vehicle and located a vehicle park, which was used to supplement the unit jeeps in bringing in casualties. The fluid situation on the battlefield prevented some casualties from being evacuated to the MDS, and they were treated where they were by the units medics, until it was safe to move them. During the day the field ambulance was under almost constant, sniper and artillery fire, but by 21:00 contact was made with the 3rd Infantry Division, and within an hour sixty casualties were evacuated to the beachhead. Another 280 remaining wounded were being treated at the MDS. Fighting in the area continued through the night and by 05:00 7 June 380 wounded had been dealt with at the MDS. In the first forty hours of the landings, the unit's surgeons had performed forty-three operations.

Following the battle of Breville on 12 June, two of the wounded treated by the unit were Brigadiers Kindersley and Lord Lovat, both had been wounded by friendly fire at the start of the battle. Between 14 and 18 June the MDS received casualties from the 51st (Highland) Infantry Division, which had taken over the southern sector of the Orne bridgehead. Then on 18 June, they were withdrawn and sent to a rest area beside the River Orne.

On 20 June they moved back to the front line, treated a steady flow of casualties, mostly from mortar fire and small arms wounds. Then on 18 July, they were warned to accept casualties from the 11th Armoured Division taking part in Operation Goodwood. On 8 August they were ordered to move the MDS to Le Mariquet, where they took in casualties from the 3rd Parachute Brigade. The 6th Airborne Division was ordered to advance on 12 August, and the 225th (Parachute) Field Ambulance, became responsible for collecting and evacuating all the wounded during the advance. By 27 August, the 6th Airborne Division had reached the mouth of the River Seine, and was withdrawn becoming the 21st Army Group reserve.

=== Germany ===
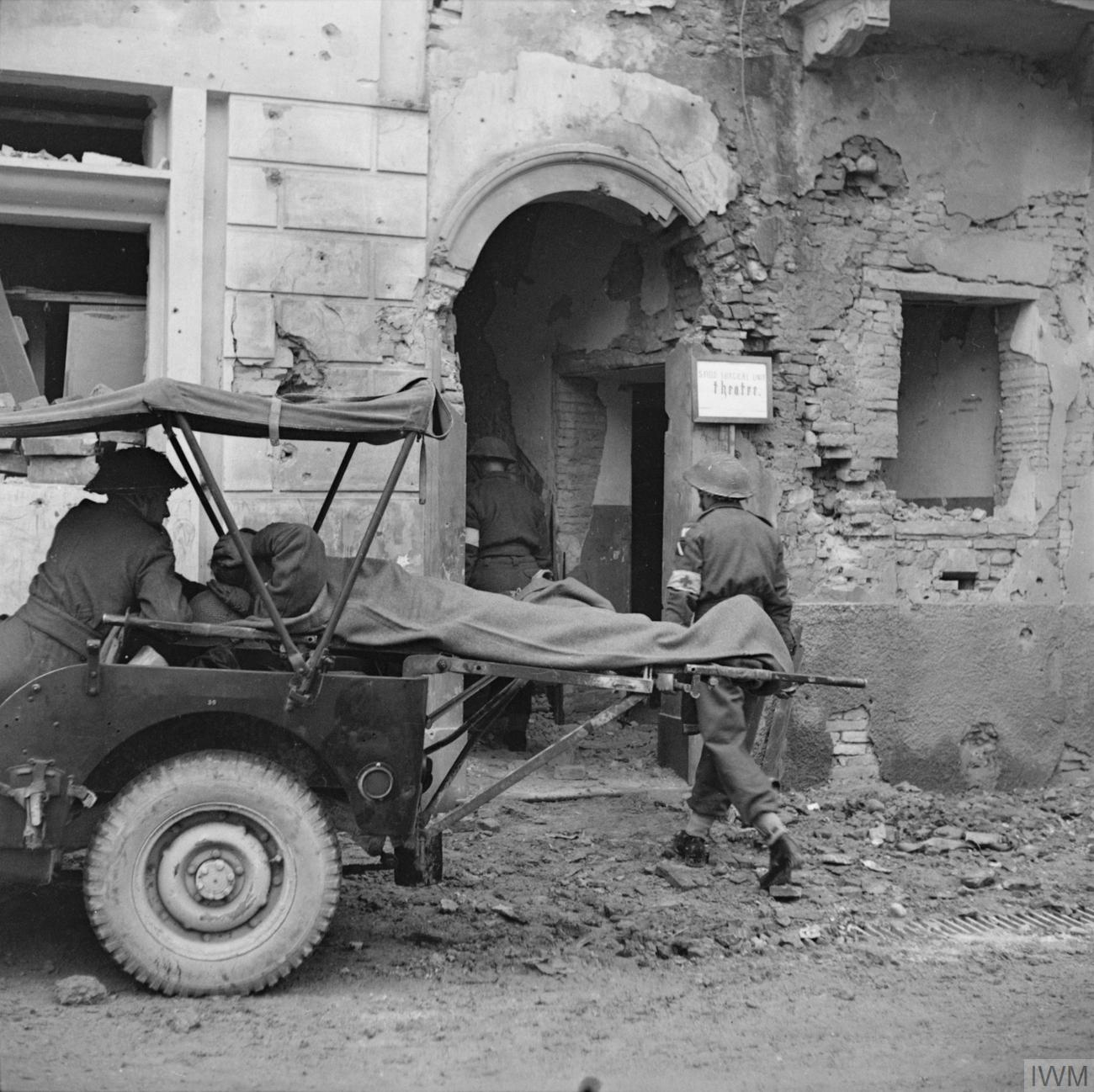
Ambulance jeep fitted with litters for carrying wounded.

The next airborne operation by 255th (Parachute) Field Ambulance, was Operation Varsity in March 1945. The 6th Airborne Division would land on the east bank of the River Rhine in the area of the Diersfordter woods, near the town of Hamminkeln. The 225th now commanded by Lieutenant-Colonel N.J.P. Hewlings still part of the 5th Parachute Brigade would land to the north of the woods, in daylight and a large number of casualties were expected.

Landing on 24 March the 225th established their MDS in some farm buildings at the edge of the woods, and were soon treating the casualties from the landings. The German infantry pulling back from the Rhine actually marched through the farm buildings without discovering the MDS. On the afternoon 25 March the leading units of the 15th (Scottish) Division, linked up with the airborne division.

The 6th Airborne Division then advanced mostly on foot, from then Rhine to Wismar on the Baltic Sea by 2 May 1945. During which in April the 3rd Parachute Brigade advanced 15 miles (24 km) in twenty-four hours, which included eighteen hours of close-quarters fighting. Later the same month the 5th Parachute Brigade marched 50 miles (80 km) in seventy-two hours, during which they also carried out two night time assaults. The quick advance changed the way the 225th operated, by necessity the divisions three field ambulance units had to leap-frog to the front, the leading unit accepting all the division's casualties. Between landing and the end of the war the 225th treated 1,083 casualties.

=== Far East ===
Withdrawn back to England, on 19 July 1945 the 5th Parachute Brigade departed for India, arriving on 7 August to prepare for operations against the Japanese Empire. However the dropping of the Atom bombs on Hiroshima and Nagasaki on 6 and 9 August ended the war. It had been intended to use the brigade in Operation Zipper, the invasion of British Malaya, instead on 17 September, the brigade travelled by sea to Northern–Malaya and advanced on Kuala Lumpur unopposed. The 5th Parachute Brigade then took part in Operation Tiderace the liberation of Singapore, as part of XV Corps. In Singapore the 225th were quartered in Alexander Barracks, being responsible for the welfare of Japanese prisoners and some Germans who had been part of the German Naval Mission and the crews of two U-boats.

Then in December 1945, the Brigade was sent to Java, to help restore law and order until a Dutch force could arrive from Europe. By 25 December the 225th were in Jakarta The Brigade was then sent to Semarang and the 225th became responsible for the medical welfare of the towns 210,000 inhabitants. When the Dutch force arrived the 225th returned to Singapore arriving on 2 May 1946. Two months later the 5th Parachute Brigade were ordered to Palestine to rejoin the 6th Airborne Division arriving on 9 August. The 225th (Parachute) Field Ambulance being now surplus to requirements was disbanded on 19 August, the men being posted as reinforcements to the divisions other medical units.

== Notes ==
Footnotes

Citations
