= Field Ambulance =

Wartime mobile medical unit in British Army

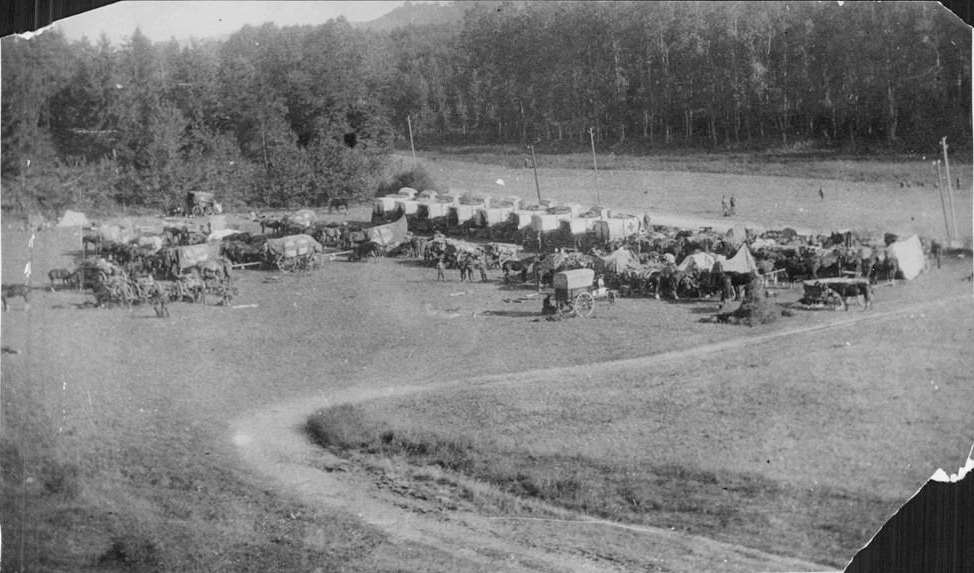
A field ambulance in France.

A field ambulance (FA) is the name used by the British Army and the armies of other Commonwealth nations to describe a mobile medical unit that treats wounded soldiers very close to the combat zone. In the British military medical system that developed during the First World War, the FAs formed an intermediate level in the casualty evacuation chain that stretched from the regimental aid posts near the front line and the casualty clearing stations located outside the range of the enemy's artillery. FAs were often assigned to the brigades of a division.

The term is no longer used in the British Royal Army Medical Service. They were replaced by medical regiments (which are assigned to brigades) and field hospitals. It is however still used in the Royal Canadian Medical Service within the Canadian Armed Forces.

== World War I ==
=== Sinai and Palestine Campaign ===
During the October and November 1917 offensive by the Egyptian Expeditionary Force there were no advanced medical base east of Kantara on the Suez Canal. The operations was supported by the British general and stationary hospitals in Egypt, with casualty clearing stations at Deir el Belah.

On 28 October the 4th Light Horse Field Ambulance "stood to" all day doing dressings in the open, before riding out from Tel el Fara at 16:00 towards Beersheba. Medical orderlies rode donkeys, mules pulled the supply wagons, stretcher bearers rode horses and more horses pulled the ambulances while camels carried the Tent Division, "a complete Light Horse Field Ambulance, for the first time on record." Ten days of concentration and approach marches across the difficult and waterless country in "extreme secrecy" successfully culminated on 31 October 1917 with the capture of Beersheba. On that day, Nos. 35, 65, and 75 Casualty Clearing Stations were in position at Imara, while the Motor Ambulance Convoy cars attached to the Desert Mounted Corps drove between them and the Anzac Mounted Division receiving station at Rashid Bek. The Australian Mounted Division receiving station and the operating car were at Asluj, with some of the light motor ambulance waggons. Mobile sections of field ambulances followed their brigades while cacolet camels followed the divisions, and the remaining light motor ambulance waggons drove along the steep and winding eastern road from Asluj.

The New Zealand Expeditionary Force established several field ambulances during the First World War, and 4, 5, and 6 Field Ambulance served with the 2nd New Zealand Expeditionary Force in the Mediterranean during the Second World War.

== See also ==
- Field hospital
- 4th Light Horse Field Ambulance
- Light horse field ambulance
- Field ambulances of the Canadian Forces
  - 1 Field Ambulance, based in Edmonton
  - 2 Field Ambulance, based in Petawawa
  - 12 (Vancouver) Field Ambulance
  - 15 (Edmonton) Field Ambulance
  - 16 (Regina) Field Ambulance
  - 18 (Thunder Bay) Field Ambulance
  - 25 (Toronto) Field Ambulance

Second World War units

  - 16th (Parachute) Field Ambulance
  - 127th (Parachute) Field Ambulance
  - 133rd (Parachute) Field Ambulance
  - 224th (Parachute) Field Ambulance
  - 225th (Parachute) Field Ambulance
  - 181st (Airlanding) Field Ambulance
  - 195th (Airlanding) Field Ambulance
