= 16th (Parachute) Field Ambulance =

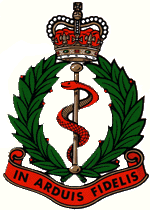
- Cap badge of the Royal Army Medical Corps
- Active: 1941–1945
- Country: United Kingdom
- Branch: British Army
- Type: Medical
- Role: Airborne forces
- Size: Field Ambulance
- Part of: 1st Parachute Brigade
- Engagements: Tunisian Campaign; Operation Fustian; Operation Slapstick; Battle of Arnhem; Operation Doomsday

Insignia
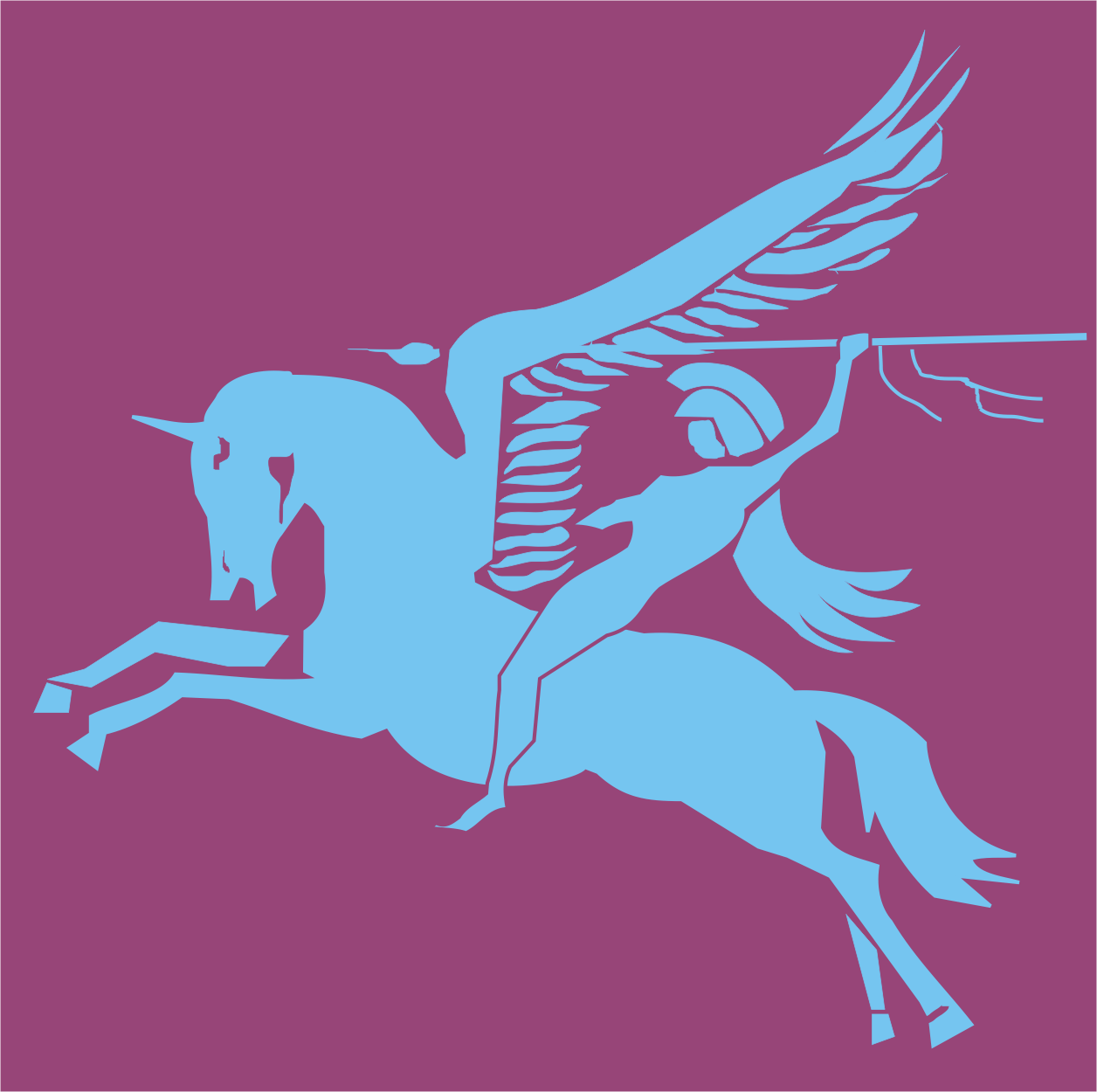
- British Airborne Forces insignia

The 16th (Parachute) Field Ambulance was a Royal Army Medical Corps unit of the British airborne forces during the Second World War. The unit was the first parachute field ambulance unit of the British Army. Their first deployment was in Operation Torch the Allied landings in North Africa. This was followed by Operation Fustian during the Allied invasion of Sicily. Their third mission was Operation Slapstick, a seaborne landing at Taranto in Italy.

The 16th (Parachute) Field Ambulance then returned to England to prepare for operations in North West Europe. Their next and final parachute landing was in September 1944, during the Battle of Arnhem. In the battle the 1st Parachute Brigade landed on the first day and the 16th (Parachute) Field Ambulance established at dressing station in a local hospital. Within days the location was overrun by the Germans and the majority of the field ambulance went into captivity as prisoners of war.

In 1945 it was reformed and took part in Operation Doomsday the occupation of Norway following the surrender of German forces there, but with the war over the unit was disbanded by the end of the year.

== Background ==
Impressed by the success of German airborne operations, during the Battle of France, the British Prime Minister, Winston Churchill, directed the War Office to investigate the possibility of creating a corps of 5,000 parachute troops. In September 1941 the 1st Parachute Brigade began forming, comprising three parachute infantry battalions. In keeping with British Army practice at the same time, as the infantry battalions were being raised, airborne supporting arms were formed, including Royal Army Medical Corps volunteers.

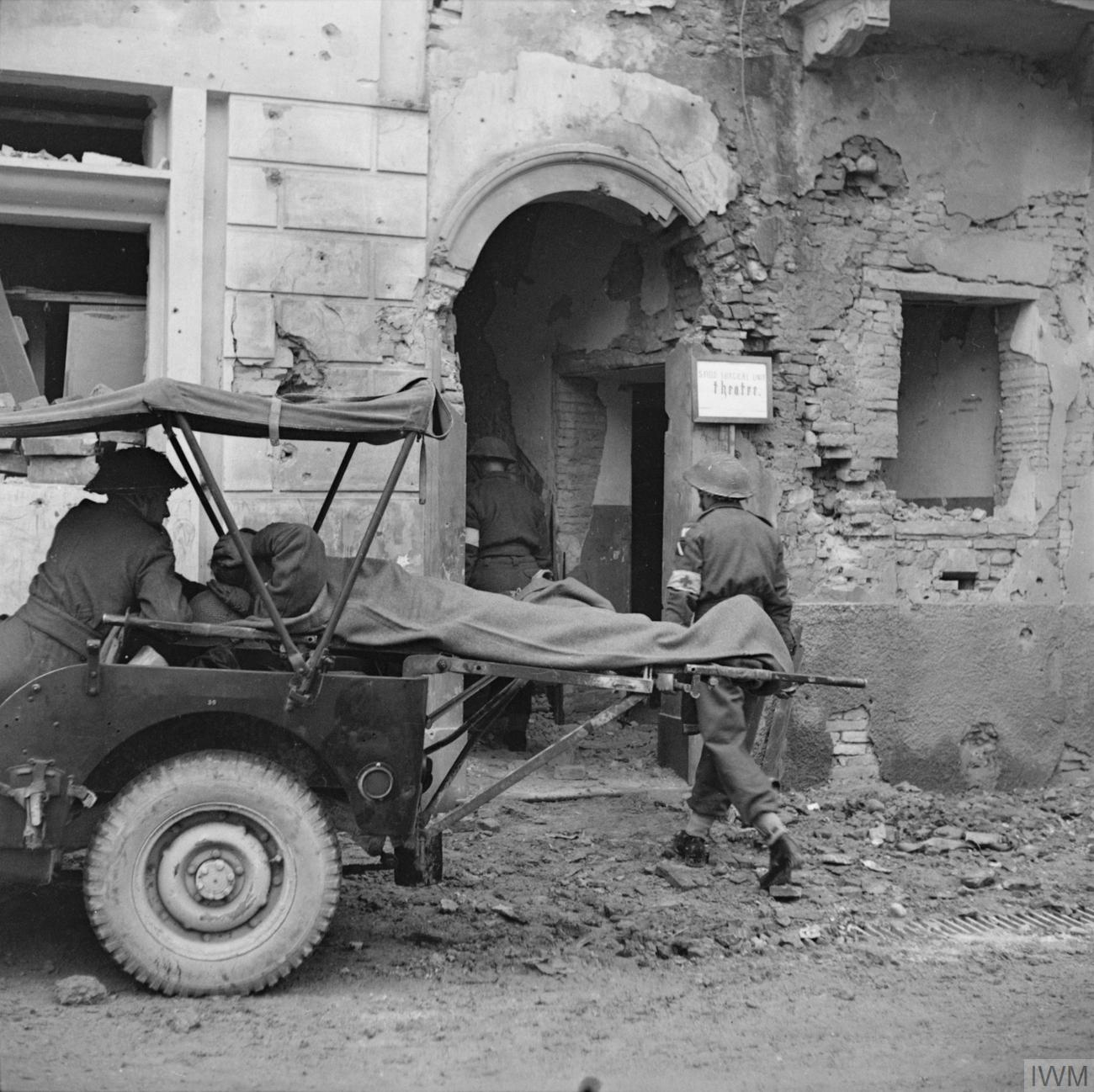
Ambulance jeep fitted with litters for carrying wounded

The war establishment of a Parachute Field Ambulance, was 177 all ranks. Consisting of thirteen doctors in two surgical teams and four sections. The doctors could deal with 330 cases in a twenty-four-hour period. Each surgical team could handle 1.8 operations an hour. But that was not sustainable, and if they were required to operate the following day, the team had to be relieved after twelve hours. It was envisaged that during airborne operations, it would not be possible to evacuate casualties until the ground forces had linked up with them. Therefore, the field ambulance had the ability to treat all types of wounds, and provide post-operative care for up to fourteen days. (Note: Fourteen days was a medical, not tactical requirement; casualties with abdominal wounds which had a thirty to forty per cent mortality rate, could not be moved before this.) They also had the transport required to evacuate casualties from the Regimental Aid Post (RAP), to the Main Dressing Station (MDS).

An airborne field ambulance was commanded by a lieutenant-colonel, with a major as the second in command and a regimental sergeant major as the senior non-commissioned rank. Headquarters staff included two specialist surgeons and a specialist anaesthetist, a pharmacist and an Army Dental Corps dentist. To assist in the operating theatre and with post-operative care, there were six operating room assistants, a sergeant nursing orderly and six nursing orderlies. Other medical staff were a sergeant sanitary assistant, a masseur, a dental orderly and five stretcher bearers, one of whom was trained as a shoemaker. The rest of the headquarters consisted of a Quartermaster, clerks, cooks, storemen, an Army Physical Training Corps instructor, a barber and a joiner from the Royal Engineers.

There were four sub-units of twenty men known as sections. Each section comprised an officer (doctor) and a staff sergeant (nursing orderly). Under their command were three nursing orderlies, a clerk, a dutyman and thirteen stretcher bearers. A section was normally attached to a parachute battalion to supplement their own medical officer and medics. (Note: All the units in the brigades and division had a RAMC doctor and up to eighteen RAMC other ranks on their strength.)

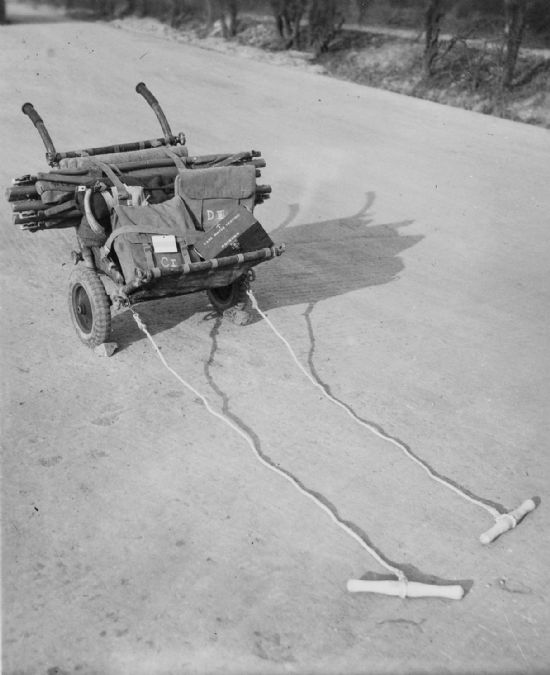
Airborne trolley, with a folding stretcher, Don and Sugar packs

The last component of the Field Ambulance was the Royal Army Service Corps detachment, commanded by a captain, with a company sergeant major as second in command. They had fifty men under them, an electrician, a clerk, thirty-eight drivers, four motorcyclists and five vehicle mechanics. It was normal to have at least two RASC drivers with two jeeps and a trailer attached to each section, the remaining men and vehicles stayed with the headquarters surgical teams.

All members of the Field Ambulance had to undergo a twelve-day parachute training course carried out at No. 1 Parachute Training School, RAF Ringway. Initial parachute jumps were from a converted barrage balloon and finished with five parachute jumps from an aircraft. (Note: Barrage balloons were used to speed up training jumps and meet the target of 5,000 trained parachutists.) Anyone failing to complete a descent was returned to his old unit. Those men who successfully completed the parachute course, were presented with their maroon beret and parachute wings.

Airborne operations were in their infancy in the Second World War and the British Army medical services had to design and develop a range of special medical airborne equipment. These included the Don pack, the Sugar pack (containing dressing and surgical items respectively), the folding airborne stretcher, the folding trestle table, the folding suspension bar, the airborne operating table, the airborne inhaler and special containers for blood and plasma.

== History ==
=== Formation ===
Commanded by Lieutenant-Colonel Malcolm MacEwan, the first British parachute field ambulance, the 16th Airborne Field Ambulance was raised on 3 April 1941, at Hardwick Hall in Derbyshire. The first arrivals being thirty-three men transferred from the 181st (Airlanding) Field Ambulance. Reaching full strength and having completed their parachute training the unit was re-designated the 16th (P) Field Ambulance which was later changed to the 16th (Parachute) Field Ambulance (16 PFA). The 16 PFA was assigned to the 1st Parachute Brigade in the 1st Airborne Division.

=== North Africa ===
The invasion of North Africa Operation Torch was the first time an airborne field ambulance was employed. Before this operations Colossus and Freshman had no specialist medical support, while Biting included a section from the 181st (Airlanding) Field Ambulance in the evacuation boats.

For Torch No.3 Section, 16 PFA was attached to the 3rd Parachute Battalion and travelled by plane via Gibraltar to North Africa. On 11 November 1942, they parachuted onto the airfield at Bone. While the remainder of 16 PFA and the brigade were transported to North Africa by sea, arrived the next day. En route to Bone the aircraft carrying Captain Keesey the No.3 Section commander crashed into the sea. Leaving the section second in command to set up a dressing station to handle the fourteen casualties (including one killed) from the parachute landing. By 15 November, the 1st Parachute Brigade established a position 11 miles (18 km) outside of Algiers.

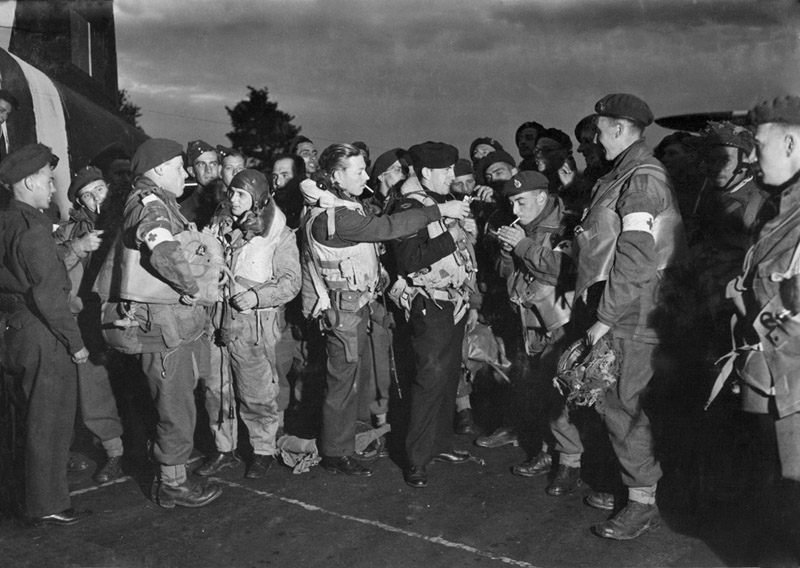
Parachute Field Ambulance troops just before boarding their aircraft.

On 17 November the 1st Parachute Battalion with No.1 Section and No.1 Surgical team 16 PFA, parachuted in to seize the airfield and an important crossroads at Béja. One man was killed in the drop and one other wounded who was treated on the drop zone (DZ), by the section. By 20:00 the battalion had occupied Béja, and the section took over a small twenty-bed hospital in the garrison school and a part of the larger 250-bed civil hospital. The town was attacked by a squadron of German Stukas on 20 November, and Lieutenant Charles Rob in command on the surgical team carried out over 150 operations during which he suffered a fractured tibia and kneecap caused by a bomb exploding nearby. Continuing to operate he carried out another twenty-two operation the next day, even giving a pint of blood to save a wounded soldier. Afterwards Lieutenant Rob was awarded a Military Cross. The section had only expected to be deployed for five days, but remained for twenty-four days, treating 238 casualties before being relieved.

On 29 November No.2 Section 16 PFA, and the 2nd Parachute Battalion, were parachuted close to Depienne Airfield. Arriving at the field at 11:00 they found it deserted and withdrew back to Prise de l'Eau. On 1 December the battalion was informed that the planned advance by 6th Armoured Division had been postponed and the battalion was trapped 50 miles (80 km) behind German lines. The battalion was virtually surrounded and fought off two attacks that morning, one company was destroyed and there were 150 casualties. The battalion divided into company groups to try to break through the German lines. But the wounded had to be left behind, in the Advanced Dressing Station (ADS) established by No.2 Section. The section remained behind to protect the wounded from the local anti-British population, until the Germans arrived and took them prisoner.

From now onwards the 1st Parachute Brigade fought as normal infantry and 16 PFA on Christmas Eve set up a Main Dressing Station (MDS) at Medjez el Bab. On 2 February the 1st Parachute battalion assaulted Djebel Mansour mountain with No. 1 Section attached. The ground was unsuitable for vehicles and the section could only take what they could carry by hand. The terrain also hindered casualty evacuation and it took ten hours, to bring the wounded from the front line to the medical post, by which time the stretcher bearers could go no further. In the situation Lieutenant-Colonel MacEwan, brought the remainder of 16 PFA forward to assist with the wounded, No.4 Section being sent to the top of Djebel Mansour. MacEwan established a relay of stretcher bearers that cut the evacuation from the top of the mountain down to three hours. The battle continued until 5 February and by that time everyone not involved in surgery, apart from three men were used as stretcher bearers. By the end of the battle the men of 16 PFA had treated 201 casualties.

The Germans and Italians counterattacked on 20 February, their attack failed but again every man was used in carrying stretchers to the rear. On 26 February the 2nd Parachute battalion defeated an Italian attack and No.3 Section was kept busy with the Italian wounded. On 3 March the brigade were moved to Sedjenane to relieve the 139th Infantry Brigade. In the battle 16 PFA were used to evacuate the wounded from the front line to the ADS used by the 139th Brigades field ambulance.

The commander of 1st Parachute Brigade Brigadier Gerald Lathbury, ordered that in the coming battle, the brigade would remain where they were and not withdraw. Lieutenant-Colonel MacEwan brought the two surgical teams forward together with enough medical supplies and stores to last out the battle. The attack started 8 March and over the following days the MDS was subjected to artillery and air attacks killing and wounding some 16 PFA men. On 17 March the ADS was shelled and dive-bombed eight times, but continued to operate. By the end of the twelve-day battle, 16 PFA had treated and evacuated 554 wounded.

On 12 May 16 PFA rejoined 1st Airborne Division that had arrived in theatre and Lieutenant-Colonel MacEwan leaving to join 6th Airborne Division, handed over command to Major Gerard (Ross) Wheatley who was promoted to lieutenant-colonel.

=== Sicily and Italy ===
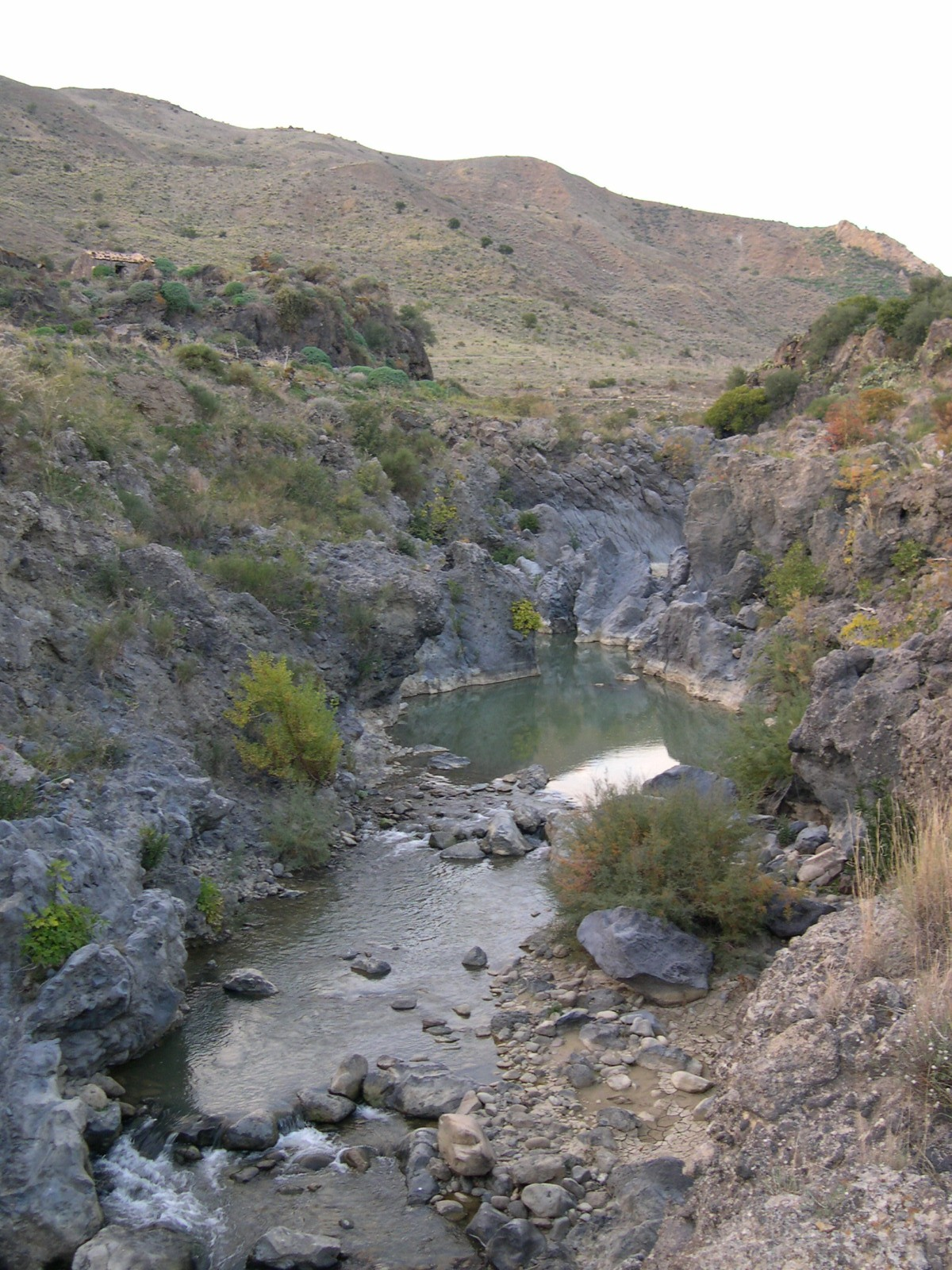
The Simeto river

The next action for 16 PFA was during the Allied invasion of Sicily. The 1st Parachute Brigade was to capture Primosole Bridge crossing the River Simeto, south of Catania. The brigade now consisted of the 1st, 2nd and 3rd Parachute Battalions. The 1st Airborne Anti-Tank Battery Royal Artillery, the 1st Parachute Squadron Royal Engineers and 16 PFA. During the mission the parachute battalions would have a section from 16 PFA attached. For the landing each section parachute stick included six containers of medical stores, which contained a wheeled stretcher and a hand trolley. The two surgical teams had five containers of stores. The need to carry the containers reduced each section to seventeen men. Spare men were distributed among the brigade, one officer and nineteen men with the 1st Battalion. One officer and sixteen men with the 2nd and 3rd Battalions, while Lieutenant-Colonel Wheatly and two men went with brigade headquarters.

On 12 July 1943 the brigade took off between 19:00 and 20:30, intended to parachute into Sicily between 22:20 and 23:15 the same night. The Dakota carrying No.4 Section was hit by anti-aircraft fire and crashed into the sea killing four of the sections men. No.3 Section landed on both sides of the river 5 miles (8.0 km) west of the bridge. Half the section falling in with a small group from the 3rd Battalion, were forced by enemy activity to hide out until they could rejoin the brigade late on 15 July. The Dakota carrying No.1 Surgical Team, was hit by anti-aircraft fire knocking out one of its engines. Five men including one of the surgeons Captain Lipmann-Kessel unable to jump were taken back to North Africa. The rest of 16 PFA although scattered landed without incident. The MDS was established in farm buildings south of the river. In the first thirteen hours the MDS carried out twenty-one operations and were looking after sixty-one British and twenty-nine Italian patients by 22:00 the following night. However, in that time the brigade had been forced off the bridge and the MDS was now in no-man's land. Those men that could be spared were sent back with the brigade. An Italian officer arrived and informed them that they had been captured, but later that day, 2nd Parachute Battalion advancing with the 50th (Northumbrian) Infantry Division liberated the MDS. During their time in captivity the MDS had carried out a further fourteen operation. By the end of the mission 109 wounded had been treated and thirty-one operations, had been carried out, with only two post operative fatalities. On 17 July the brigade sailed for North Africa, arriving the next day.

For the Allied invasion of Italy the 1st airborne Division were informed on 6 September, they would be carrying out an amphibious landing at the Italian port of Taranto three days later. The landings were carried out by the 2nd and 4th Parachute Brigades, with the understrength 1st Parachute Brigade in reserve. When they did land 16 PFA took over a 350-bed hospital at Altamura, until 20 November when the division left Italy for England.

=== Arnhem ===
The next mission for 16 PFA was the airborne assault in the Netherlands. The 1st Airborne Division would land outside of Arnhem over three days. The 1st Parachute Brigade was in the first days landings and had to capture the crossings over the River Rhine. Now under the command of Lieutenant-Colonel E. Townsend, the airborne element of 16 PFA was ten officers and 125 other ranks. To supplement the airborne group, another travelled by land, which included the bulk of their transport and seven ambulances. Loaded with seven days supplies of medical equipment and stores. After landing 16 PFA were to clear the casualties on the brigade DZ, and then move into Arnhem to take over the St Elizabeth Hospital.

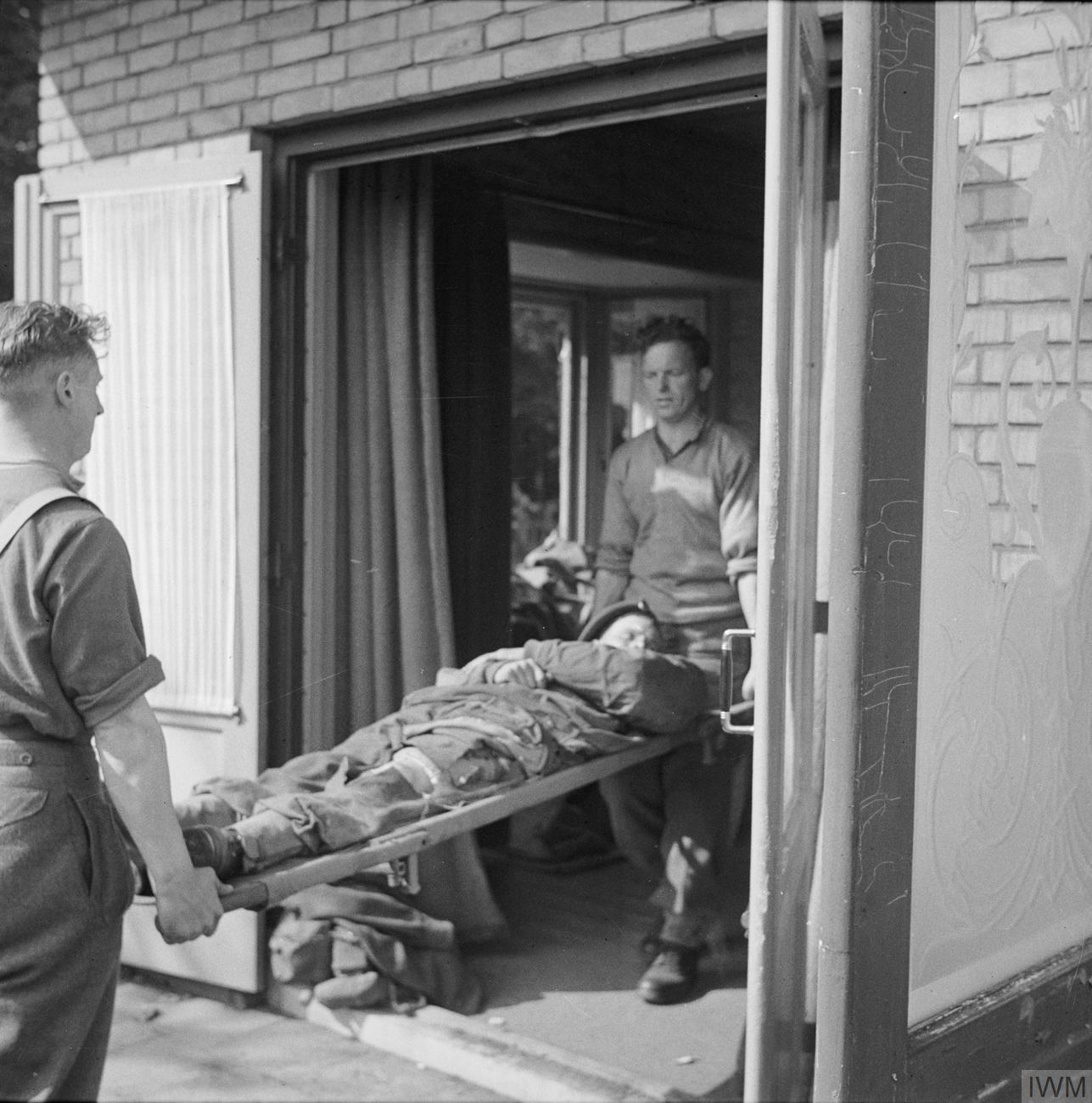
Stretcher bearers and wounded paratrooper during the Battle of Arnhem.

At 11:00 on 17 September 1944 16 PFA boarded their aircraft in Lincolnshire and took off for the Netherlands. The daylight flight was uneventful and the brigade landed between 13:15 and 14:00, about 4.5 miles (7.2 km) outside of the town. One hour after the bulk of 1st Airlanding Brigade had arrived by glider. After treating the casualties on the DZ, 16 PFA moved through Oosterbeek into the western outskirts of Arnhem and took over the St Elizabeth Hospital. When they arrived, there was already some British wounded waiting for them and by 22:00 the surgical teams had started operating. Fighting in the area continued overnight and by 08:00 the next morning German troops recaptured the hospital. After discussing the situation with the Germans, it was agreed that the two surgical teams, nineteen men could remain, all the others including the commanding officer were taken away as prisoners of war. Units of the Waffen SS occupied the hospital with guards on the doors of the operating theatres. On 19 September an attack by 1st Parachute Brigade liberated the hospital again. The area around the hospital was fiercely contested and it was hit a number of times by mortar and artillery rounds. By the end of the day the parachute brigade had been forced back and the hospital was once again captured by the Germans. For the next two days the hospital continued to operate accepting casualties from both sides. On 21 September a German officer arrived and warned the 16 PFA staff that several hundred more wounded would be arriving soon. Casualties continued to arrive at the hospital until 27 September when everyone fit to travel was moved to a prisoner of war hospital at Apeldoorn. Captain Lipmann-Kessel successfully operated on Brigadier Hackett, who had serious wounds to his thigh and lower intestine. Within a few days, Hackett was smuggled out by the Dutch underground. Thanks to Lipmann-Kessel's work, Hackett eventually recovered and in February 1945 successfully evaded the Germans to reach friendly lines. During the battle between 700–800 British wounded had been treated and 150 operations had been carried out. Only twenty men who reached the hospital had died, the majority arriving so badly injured that their wounds were inoperable.

=== Norway ===
After Arnhem 1st Airborne Division and 16 PFA were reformed, now commanded by Lieutenant-Colonel N.J.P Hewlings. The war ended before they could go into action again, however they were sent to Norway to help disarm the 400,000-strong German garrison. The 16 PFA landed at Oslo on 10 May 1945, their role was the medical screening of the large numbers of Russian prisoners of war and assist in the evacuation of the German Army. By the end of June 1945 the 1st Airborne Division was withdrawn back to England and in October, 16 PFA was disbanded.

== Notes ==
Footnotes

Citations
