= 127th (Parachute) Field Ambulance =

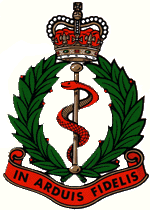
- Cap badge of the Royal Army Medical Corps
- Active: 1942–1947
- Country: United Kingdom
- Branch: British Army
- Type: Medical
- Role: Airborne forces
- Size: Field Ambulance
- Part of: 2nd Parachute Brigade
- Engagements: Operation Slapstick; Italian Campaign; Operation Dragoon; Operation Manna; Palestine

Insignia
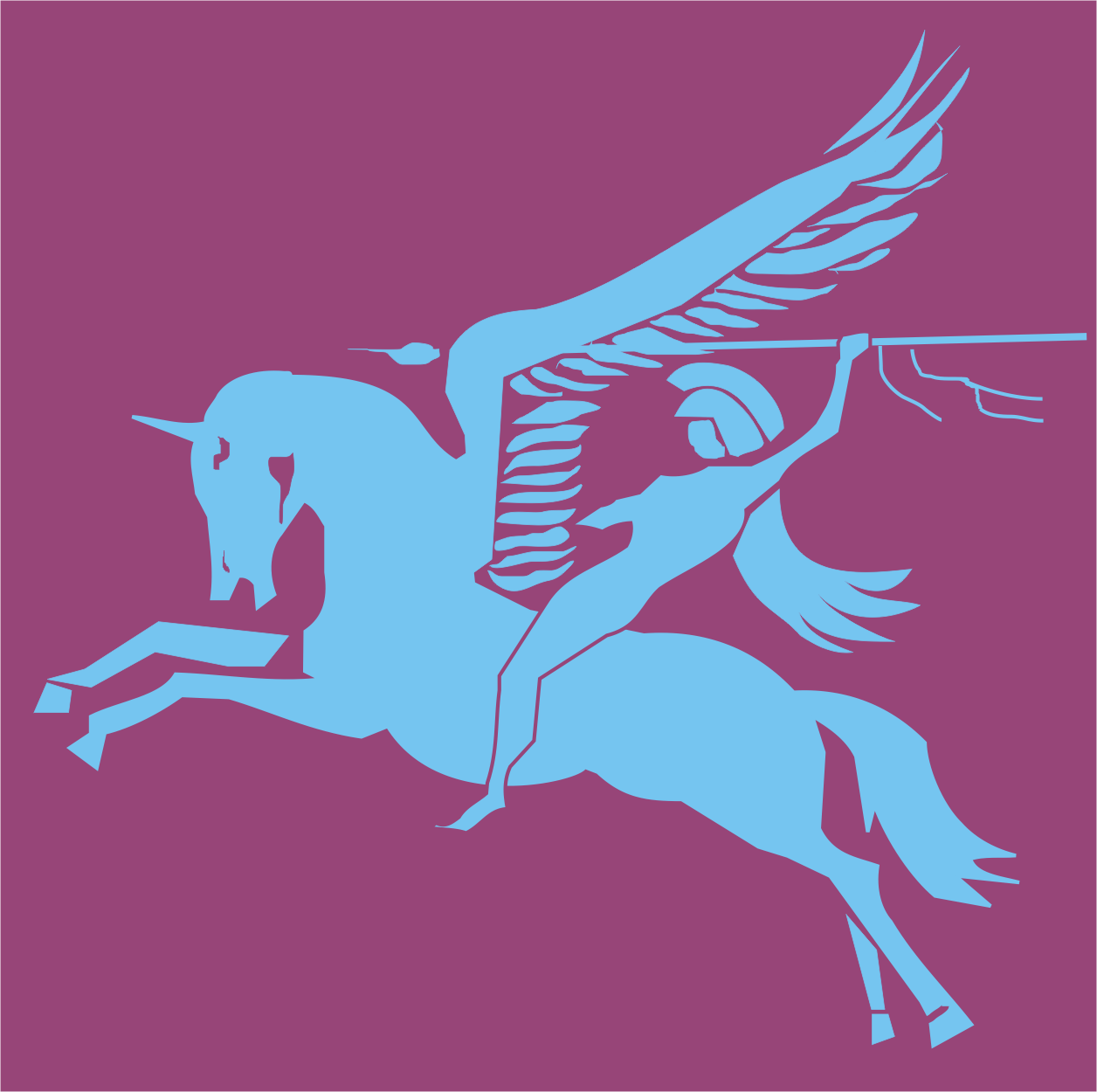
- British Airborne Forces Insignia

The 127th (Parachute) Field Ambulance was a Royal Army Medical Corps unit of the British airborne forces during the Second World War.

The 127th (Parachute) Field Ambulance (127 PFA) was originally a pre war Territorial Army unit and served alongside the 125th and 126th Field Ambulances, and 5th (Western) General Hospital RAMC (Now 207 "Manchester" Field Hospital) in the North West of England. It was converted to parachute duties, becoming the second parachute field ambulance in the British Army. As such it was assigned to the 2nd Parachute Brigade at the time part of the 1st Airborne Division.

As part of the 1st Airborne Division it moved to North Africa in 1942, in preparation for the Allied invasion of Sicily. A lack of suitable transport negated their use it that campaign, but they did take the lead in Operation Slapstick, which was an amphibious landing at Taranto in Italy. Remaining in Italy with 2nd Parachute Brigade when the 1st Airborne Division returned to England, 127 PFA took part in the fighting of the Italian campaign. Their first offensive parachute jump was in the Allied landing in the south of France, Operation Dragoon. Later, it was planned for the brigade to be sent to the Far East to take part in operations against the Japanese Empire, however, they became involved in the Greek Civil War during Operation Manna, and remained in Greece until 1945. Relieved by a larger force, 127 PFA returned to Italy where they remained until the end of the war.

With the war over 127 PFA returned to England and, still part of the 2nd Parachute Brigade, they were assigned to the 6th Airborne Division. Their next assignment was in the British mandate of Palestine, following which 127 PFA became part of the British Army of the Rhine. In 1947, when the Territorial Army was reformed, 127 PFA was re-designated as the 23rd (Parachute) Field Ambulance because the number 127 was a reserve designation.

== Background ==
Impressed by the success of German airborne operations during the Battle of France, the British Prime Minister, Winston Churchill, directed the War Office to investigate the possibility of creating a corps of 5,000 parachute troops. In September 1941 the 1st Parachute Brigade began forming, comprising three parachute infantry battalions. In keeping with British Army practice at the same time as the infantry battalions were being raised, airborne supporting arms were formed including Royal Army Medical Corps (RAMC) volunteers.

The war establishment of a Parachute Field Ambulance was 177 all ranks, made up of thirteen doctors in two surgical teams and four sections. The doctors could deal with 330 cases in a twenty-four-hour period. Each surgical team could handle 1.8 operations an hour. However this was not sustainable and if they were required to operate the following day, the team had to be relieved after twelve hours. It was envisaged that during airborne operations, it would not be possible to evacuate casualties until the ground forces had linked up with them. To accommodate this, the field ambulance had the ability to treat all types of wounds, and provide post operative care for up to fourteen days. (Note: Fourteen days was a medical, not tactical requirement. As casualties with abdominal wounds which had a thirty to forty per cent mortality rate, could not be moved before this.) They also had the transport required to evacuate casualties from the Regimental Aid Post (RAP) to the Main Dressing Station (MDS).

An airborne field ambulance was commanded by a lieutenant-colonel, with a major as the second in command and a regimental sergeant major as the senior non-commissioned rank. Headquarters staff included two specialist surgeons and a specialist anaesthetist, a pharmacist and an Army Dental Corps dentist. To assist in the operating theatre and with post operative care, there were six operating room assistants, a sergeant nursing orderly and six nursing orderlies. Other medical staff were a sergeant sanitary assistant, a masseur, a dental orderly and five stretcher bearers, one of whom was trained as a shoemaker. The rest of the headquarters consisted of a Quartermaster, clerks, cooks, storemen, an Army Physical Training Corps instructor, a barber and a joiner from the Royal Engineers.

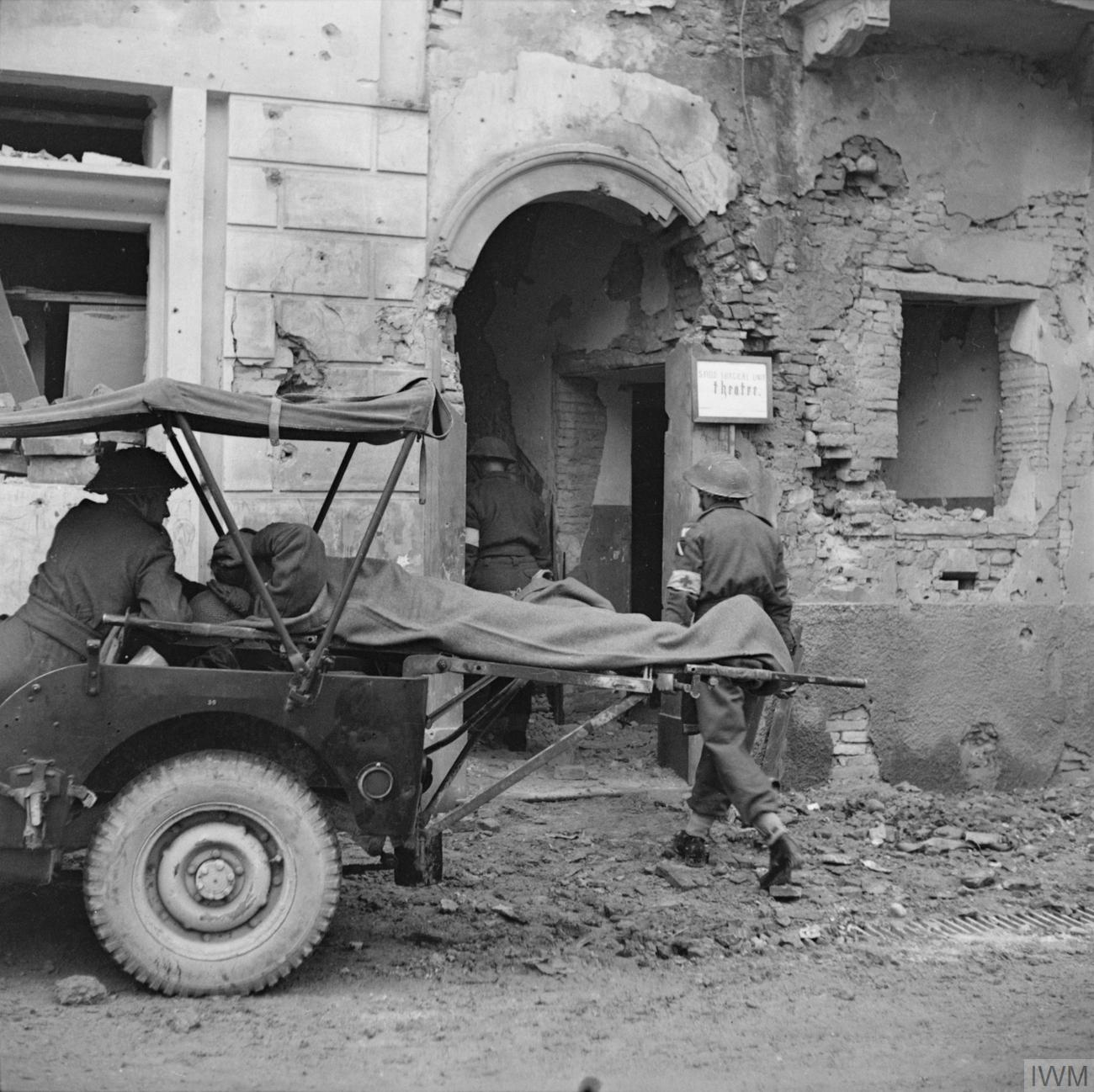
Ambulance jeep fitted with litters for carrying wounded.

There were four sub units of twenty men known as sections. Each section comprised an officer (doctor) and a staff sergeant (nursing orderly); under their command were three nursing orderlies, a clerk, a dutyman and thirteen stretcher bearers. A section was normally attached to a parachute battalion to supplement their own medical officer and medics. (Note: All the units in the brigades and division had a RAMC doctor and up to eighteen RAMC other ranks on their strength.)

The last component of the Field Ambulance was the Royal Army Service Corps detachment, commanded by a captain, with a company sergeant major as second in command. They had fifty men under them: an electrician, a clerk, thirty-eight drivers, four motorcyclists and five vehicle mechanics. It was normal to have at least two RASC drivers with two jeeps and a trailer attached to each section; the remaining men and vehicles stayed with the headquarters surgical teams.

All members of the Field Ambulance had to undergo a twelve-day parachute training course, which was carried out at No. 1 Parachute Training School, RAF Ringway. Initial parachute jumps were undertaken from a converted barrage balloon before progressing on to five jumps from an aircraft. (Note: Barrage balloons were used to speed up training jumps and meet the target of 5,000 trained parachutists.) Anyone failing to complete a descent was returned to his old unit. Those men who successfully completed the parachute course, were presented with their maroon beret and parachute wings.

Airborne operations were in their infancy in the Second World War and the British Army medical services had to design and develop a range of special medical airborne equipment. These included the Don pack, the Sugar pack, the folding airborne stretcher, the folding trestle table, the folding suspension bar, the airborne operating table, the airborne inhaler and special containers for blood and plasma.

== 127th (Parachute) Field Ambulance ==
On 17 July 1942 the 127th (Parachute) Field Ambulance (127 PFA) was formed from a pre-war Territorial Army unit. It was the second RAMC parachute unit raised, and on formation the Field Ambulance was assigned to the 2nd Parachute Brigade in the 1st Airborne Division.

=== Italy ===
After Operations Ladbroke and Fustian in Sicily, the 1st Airborne Division returned to North Africa. On 6 September the division was informed that they would be carrying out an amphibious landing at the Italian port of Taranto three days later. The landings were carried out by the 2nd and 4th Parachute Brigades, with the understrength 1st Parachute and 1st Airlanding Brigades in reserve.

While approaching the port, the minelayer HMS Abdiel, struck a mine and was blown up, killing 130 men and wounding the commanding officer Lieutenant-Colonel M. J. Kohane, two other medical officers and fifteen other ranks of 127 PFA. All the unit's medical equipment, which had been carried on board, was also lost. Otherwise the landing was unopposed; 2nd Parachute Brigade secured Taranto while the 4th Brigade pushed inland. So it was not until 26 September that the re-equipped 127 PFA was able to open a Main Dressing Station (MDS) at Canossa. Following the division's advance on 30 September 127 PFA had moved to Acquaviva taking over a school and converting it into a 100-bed hospital. During this time the division's four field ambulances treated 1,728 casualties, with the surgeons conducting 194 operations.

On 20 November, the 1st Airborne Division returned to England, leaving the 2nd Parachute Brigade in Italy as an independent brigade. Now under the command of Lieutenant-Colonel P. Parkinson, 127 PFA also remained with the brigade. The brigade was ordered to the Sangro river area. Informed they would only be in the front line for around three weeks, only two sections and a surgical team with the headquarters moved forward. The brigade stayed in the line until May, and the 127 PFA sections took the opportunity to rotate between the front and rear areas. The brigade fought on the Adriatic coast until they were relieved at the end of March 1944. After a short rest they returned to the front in the Monte Cassino sector, remaining there until the end of May 1944.

=== South of France ===
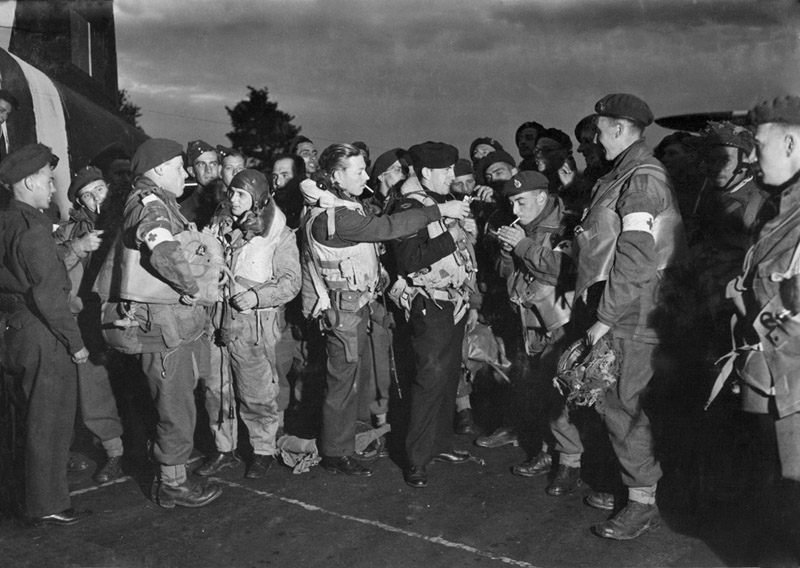
Parachute Field Ambulance troops just before boarding their aircraft.

The 2nd Parachute Brigade next came under command of the 1st Airborne Task Force for an airborne landing in the south of France in the area of Frejus. The landing took place in the early hours of 15 August 1944; the commanding officer and three other ranks parachuted in with the brigade headquarters. No.3 Section and No.1 Surgical Team dropped together but landed well off the drop zone (DZ) in the La Mote area. The airborne containers with their medical supplies were all lost or looted before they were located. It was not until 07:30 that they reached the DZ, and had to set up an operating theatre to treat the wounded from the parachute drop. The team remained here until 19:30 when they moved to a better location at St Michel. An hour later the surgical team was operating again, this time dealing with a number of casualties from the following glider force that had just landed, including a number of Americans who had no medical support with them. Between 15 and 18 August the surgical team performed forty-two operations. On the morning 18 August units of the American 36th Infantry Division advancing from the coast reached Le Muy. The brigade then moved to the Frejus area on 20 August and Cannes was liberated on 25 August. The brigade sailed from Cannes the next day arriving in Naples on 28 August.

=== Greece ===
The 2nd Parachute Brigade was warned for an operation in Greece, to replace the retreating German Army and ensure law and order was maintained until a government could be formed. The 127 PFA plan was for a small detachment of one officer and nine other ranks to be attached to each of the parachute battalions. A section and a surgical team would accompany brigade headquarters in the first lift and a section would come in with the second lift. Two jeeps with medical equipment would come in with the brigade's glider force.

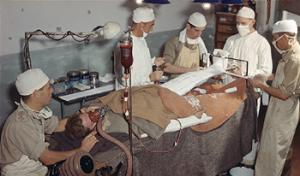
Patient given a blood transfusion at an Advanced Dressing Station.

The advance party from the 4th Parachute Battalion landed on 12 October on Megara airfield 28 miles (45 km) from Athens. Adverse weather affected the drop and caused a number of casualties, and prevented the remainder of the brigade landing. Plans were formed for a surgical team to travel by glider the next day to support the 4th Battalion's medical officer on the airfield. By 14 October the weather had improved and the majority of the brigade less the glider force, was able to parachute onto the airfield. High winds caused a number of casualties; from the 1,900 men taking part three were killed and ninety-seven wounded. The 127 PFA detachment with the 6th (Royal Welch) Parachute Battalion set up a dressing station to treat the wounded. The 4th and 6th Battalions set out for Athens taking their 127 PFA detachments with them, leaving only the commanding-officer and twenty-five men at the dressing station.

The brigade became responsible for policing Athens and keeping both sides in the fledgling Greek Civil War apart. However, on 17 October 4 Battalion, with No.3 Section attached, was ordered to Thebes to follow up the retreating German Army. On 18 October 127 PFA moved into Athens from Megara, and took over the Evangelismos Hospital.

On 4 November 6 Battalion moved to Thebes, while the 5th (Scottish) Parachute Battalion with brigade headquarters and 127 PFA moved to Salonika. It had been intended to withdraw the brigade but the situation deteriorated and they were sent back to Athens, where by 5 November 127 PFA had established a hospital in the Rouf barracks. The 2nd Parachute and 2nd Armoured Brigade moved into the city holding the Acropolis of Athens and strategic junctions. In the sporadic fighting casualties were light but constant. At the end of 1944, it had been planned for the 2nd Parachute Brigade to go to India, to join the 44th Indian Airborne Division. However, their continued involvement in Greece put those plans on hold and they were eventually cancelled. On 7 December war was officially declared on the ELAS forces. On 14 December 127 PFA moved to the university in the city centre and became the only unit capable of performing surgery. Between 14 October and 23 January 1945, when the fighting ended, 127 PFA treated 628 wounded and conducted 214 operations.

=== Palestine ===
In February 1945, the brigade was relieved and returned to Italy from Greece. They were prepared for further operations in the spring offensive and the crossing of the River Po. From March until the end of the war, over thirty airborne operations were planned but all were later cancelled. With the war over the brigade returned to England in May 1945. They were based at Greenham Lodge in Newbury, Berkshire, until 26 October when, along with the rest of 2nd Parachute Brigade, they sailed from Liverpool to join the 6th Airborne Division in Palestine.

On their arrival in Palestine they were deployed in the Gaza district. By July 1946 the situation in the country had deteriorated to such an extent that the complete division was deployed to Tel Aviv, with the field ambulance units taking over the running of the city's hospitals.

=== Legacy ===
In January 1947, 2nd Parachute Brigade returned to England, and was stationed in Aldershot. When the Territorial Army was reformed on 1 April 1947, 127 PFA was renumbered 23rd (Parachute) Field Ambulance (23 PFA) because the number 127 was a reserve designation. Since then the British airborne force has been reduced to a single brigade group based on the 2nd Parachute Brigade, which was itself renumbered as the 16th. With them, 23 PFA has participated in a number of conflicts including the last battalion-sized parachute landing undertaken at Suez in 1956, where a section and a surgical team of 23 PFA jumped with the 3rd Parachute Battalion.

== Notes ==
Footnotes

Citations
