= Don pack =

A Don pack or Dressing pack, was designed for the airborne forces of the British Army during the Second World War .

The Don pack was a standardised haversack sized webbing carrier, composed of anaesthetics, drugs, serum, dressings, tins of tea, milk and sugar powder, cubes of meat extract, cigarettes, soap and candles. It was designed to contain sufficient supplies for twenty patients. Don packs were sized so a number of them could be fitted into an airborne parachute container.

== See also ==
- Sugar pack
