= Sugar pack =

A Sugar pack or Surgical pack, was designed for the airborne forces of the British Army during the Second World War .

The Sugar pack was a standardised haversack sized webbing carrier, composed of anaesthetics, drugs, bandages, gauze, swabs and plaster of Paris. It was designed to contain sufficient supplies for ten surgical cases. Sugar packs were sized so a number of them could be fitted into an airborne parachute container.

== See also ==
- Don pack
