= Second warrant officer =

Second warrant officer (2WO) is a warrant officer rank in the Singapore Armed Forces. It was the most junior of the warrant officers until the rank of third warrant officer (3WO) was brought into effect on 1 April 2010.

Third warrant officers are promoted to second warrant officers after graduation from the Joint Warrant Officer Course (JWOC) at the SAFWOS Leadership School at Pasir Laba Camp. Before the introduction of the third warrant officer, master sergeants would attend the JWOC before being promoted to second warrant officer.

Second warrant officers can take up many billets in command, staff, and instructional settings. They may be appointed regimental sergeant major or regimental quartermaster sergeant of a battalion-sized unit. They may also work in staff positions at brigade-sized units.

Being highly experienced with tactics, weapons, and equipment, they will usually undergo at least one tour as an instructor in various training schools. In this regard, they often have more practical experience than the junior officers in command of them.

== See also ==
- Singapore Armed Forces ranks
- Specialist (Singapore)

Warrant officer ranks of the Singapore Armed Forces
Insignia						
Rank	Third Warrant Officer	Second Warrant Officer	First Warrant Officer	Master Warrant Officer	Senior Warrant Officer	Chief Warrant Officer
Abbreviation	3WO	2WO	1WO	MWO	SWO	CWO
