= First warrant officer =

First warrant officer (1WO) is a warrant officer rank in the Singapore Armed Forces. It is senior to second warrant officer but junior to master warrant officer.

First warrant officers may be given appointments such as battalion regimental sergeant major. They may serve tours as instructors, or on various staffs. As comparatively senior warrant officers, they may be given appointments normally given to commissioned officers at such as quartermaster at non-combat units or platoon commander at training units.

== See also ==
- Singapore Armed Forces ranks
- Specialist (Singapore)

Warrant officer ranks of the Singapore Armed Forces
Insignia						
Rank	Third Warrant Officer	Second Warrant Officer	First Warrant Officer	Master Warrant Officer	Senior Warrant Officer	Chief Warrant Officer
Abbreviation	3WO	2WO	1WO	MWO	SWO	CWO
