= Senior warrant officer =

Warrant officer rank in Bangladeshi, Singaporean and South African military

Senior warrant officer (SWO) is a warrant officer rank in the Bangladesh Armed Forces, the Singapore Armed Forces and the South African National Defence Force.

== Bangladesh ==
Army

Senior warrant officer
Bangladesh Army

Senior warrant officer is a junior-commissioned officer rank in the Bangladesh Army, falling between Master Warrant Officer and warrant officer.
Airforce

Senior warrant officer
Bangladesh Air Force

Senior warrant officer is the junior-commissioned officer rank in the Bangladesh Air Force, falling between Master warrant officer and Warrant officer.

== Singapore ==
It is the second highest warrant officer rank, ranking below Chief Warrant Officer.

The division and formation regimental sergeant majors are mostly Senior Warrant Officers. Many Senior Warrant Officers remain in the SAFWOS Leadership School to train and groom both junior and senior warrant officers to be dynamic warrant officers of the Singapore Armed Forces. Roles undertaken by Senior Warrant Officers include Formation Sergeant Majors, Division Sergeant Majors and Chief Master Trainers.

Warrant officer ranks of the Singapore Armed Forces
Insignia						
Rank	Third Warrant Officer	Second Warrant Officer	First Warrant Officer	Master Warrant Officer	Senior Warrant Officer	Chief Warrant Officer
Abbreviation	3WO	2WO	1WO	MWO	SWO	CWO

== South Africa ==
In 2008 the warrant officer ranks of the South African National Defence Force were expanded and the rank of senior warrant officer was created.

== See also ==
- Singapore Armed Forces ranks
- Specialist (Singapore)
