= Comparative army officer ranks of Anglophone countries =

Rank comparison chart of officers for armies/land forces of Anglophone states.

== Officers ==
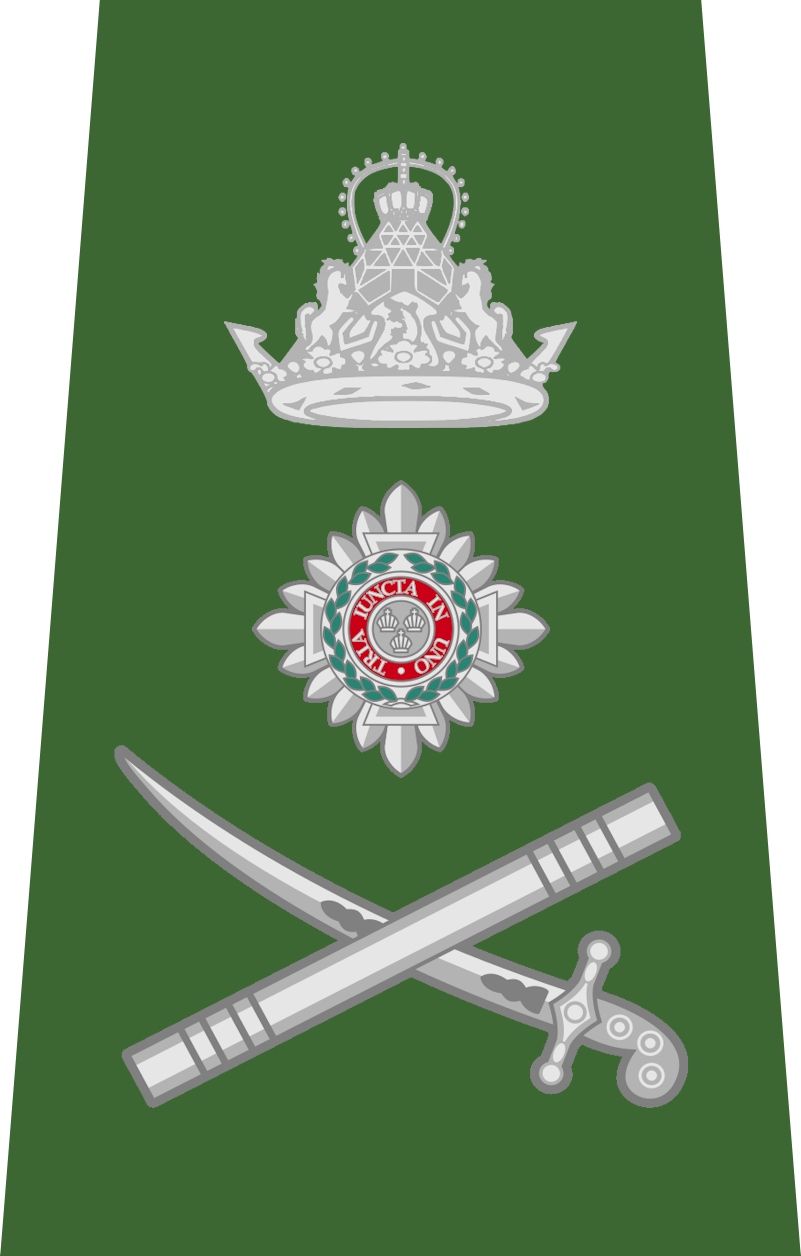
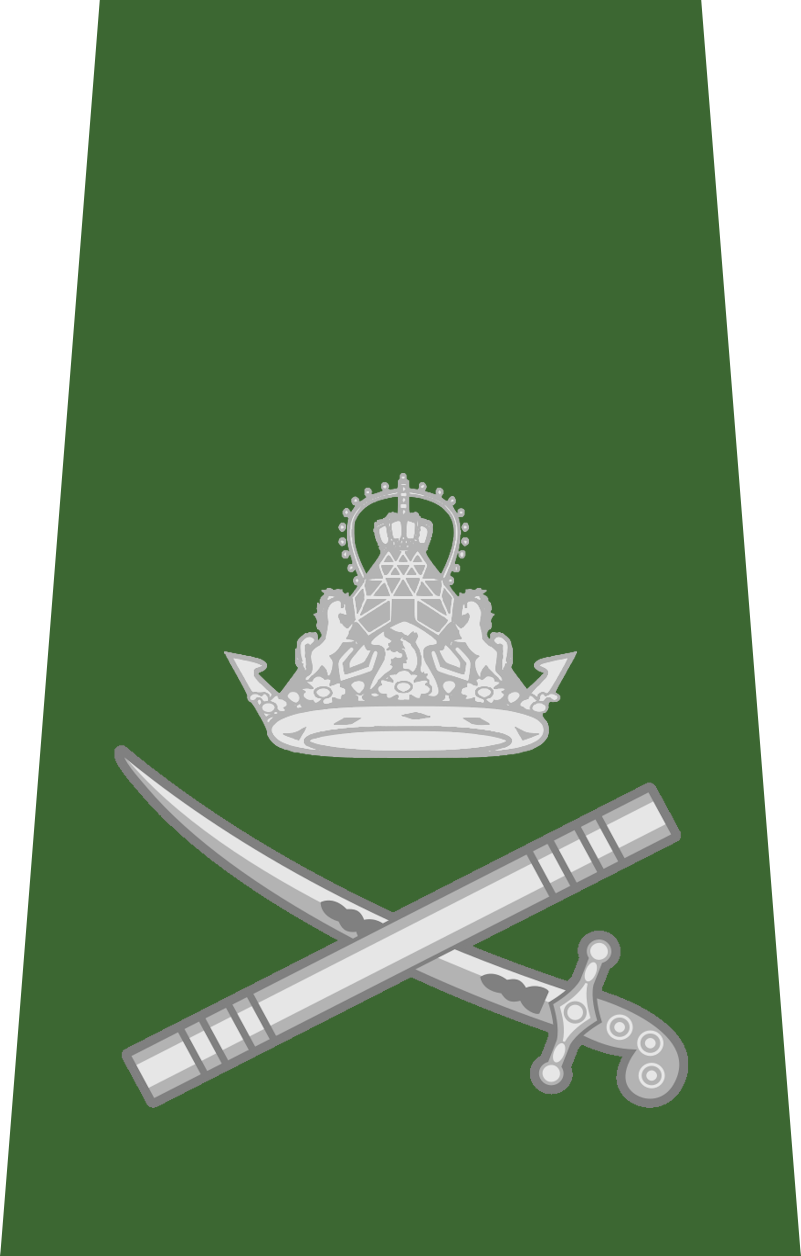
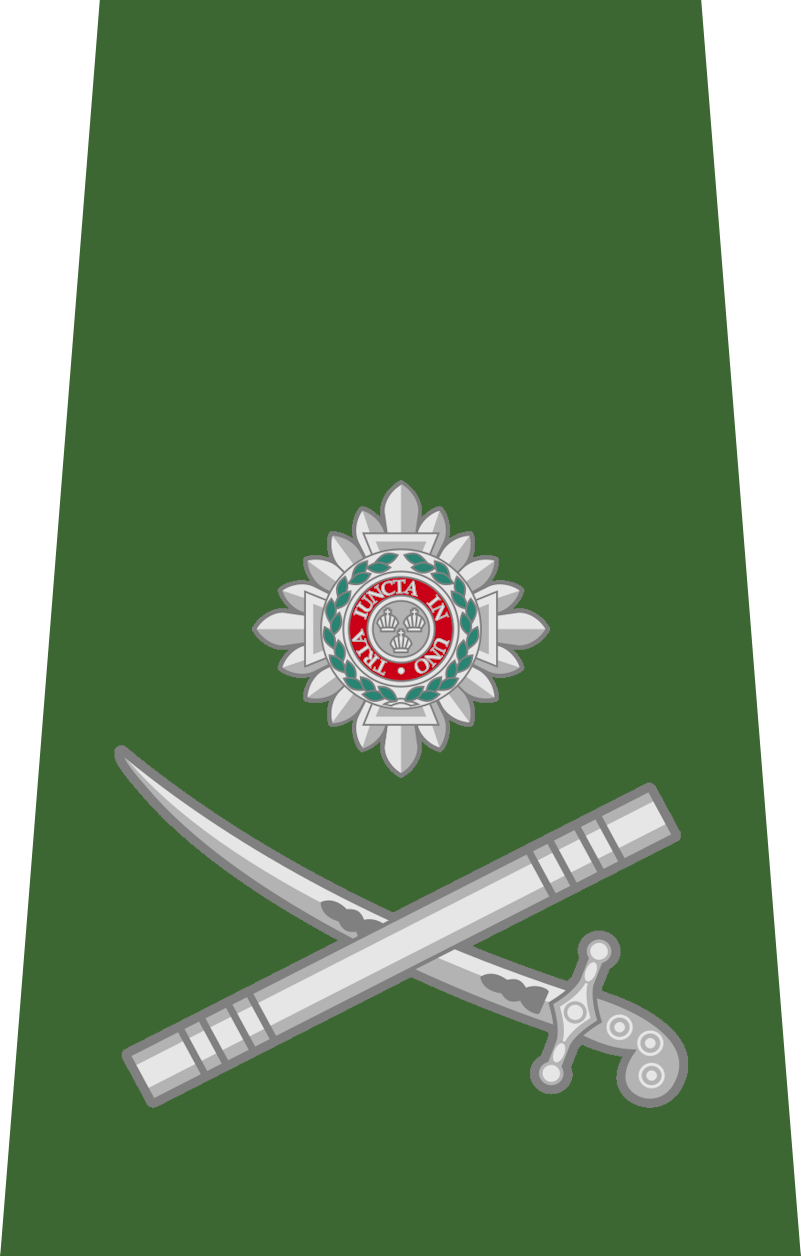
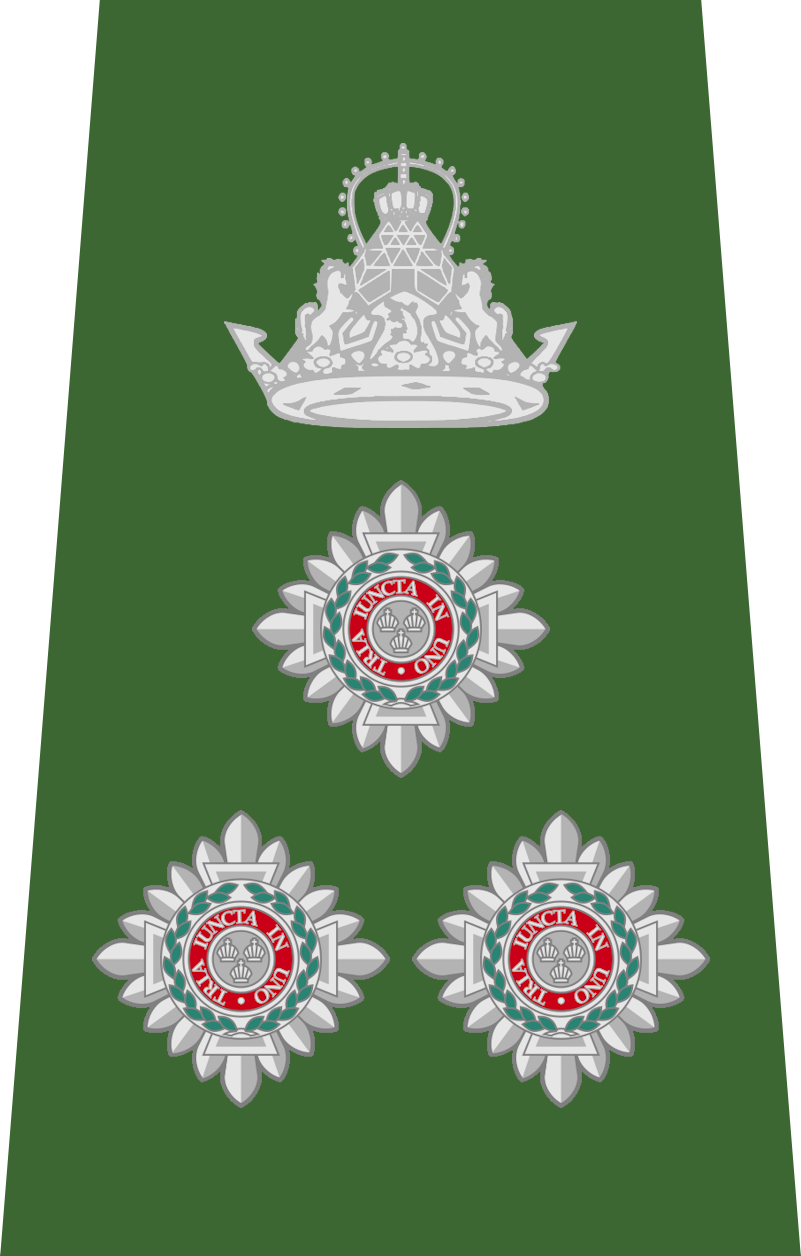
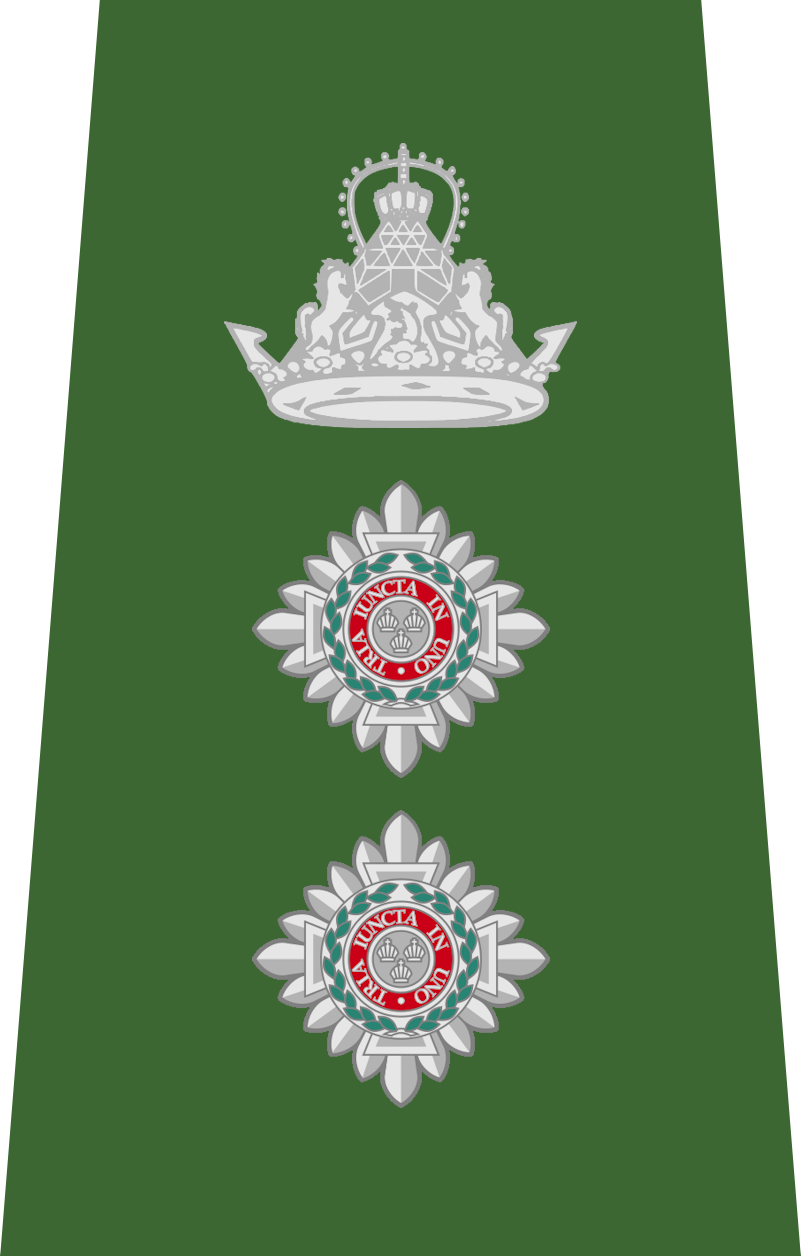
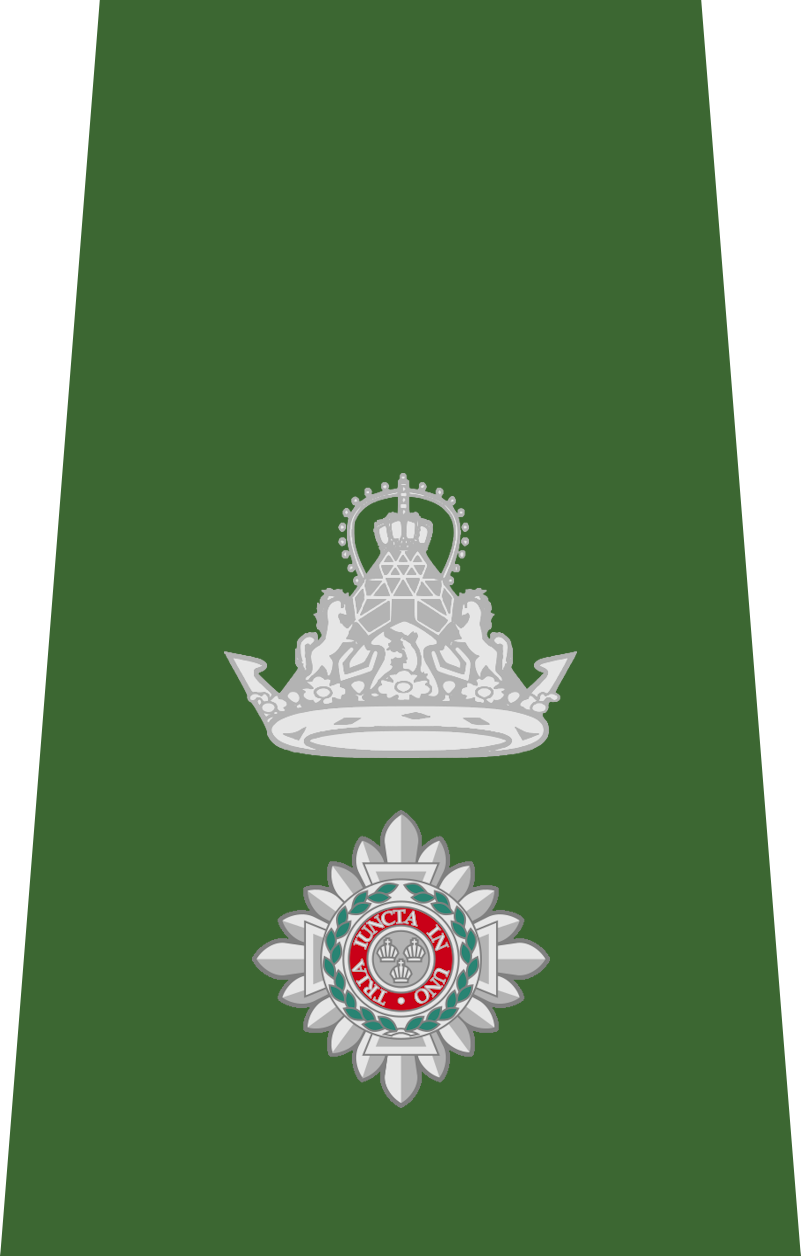
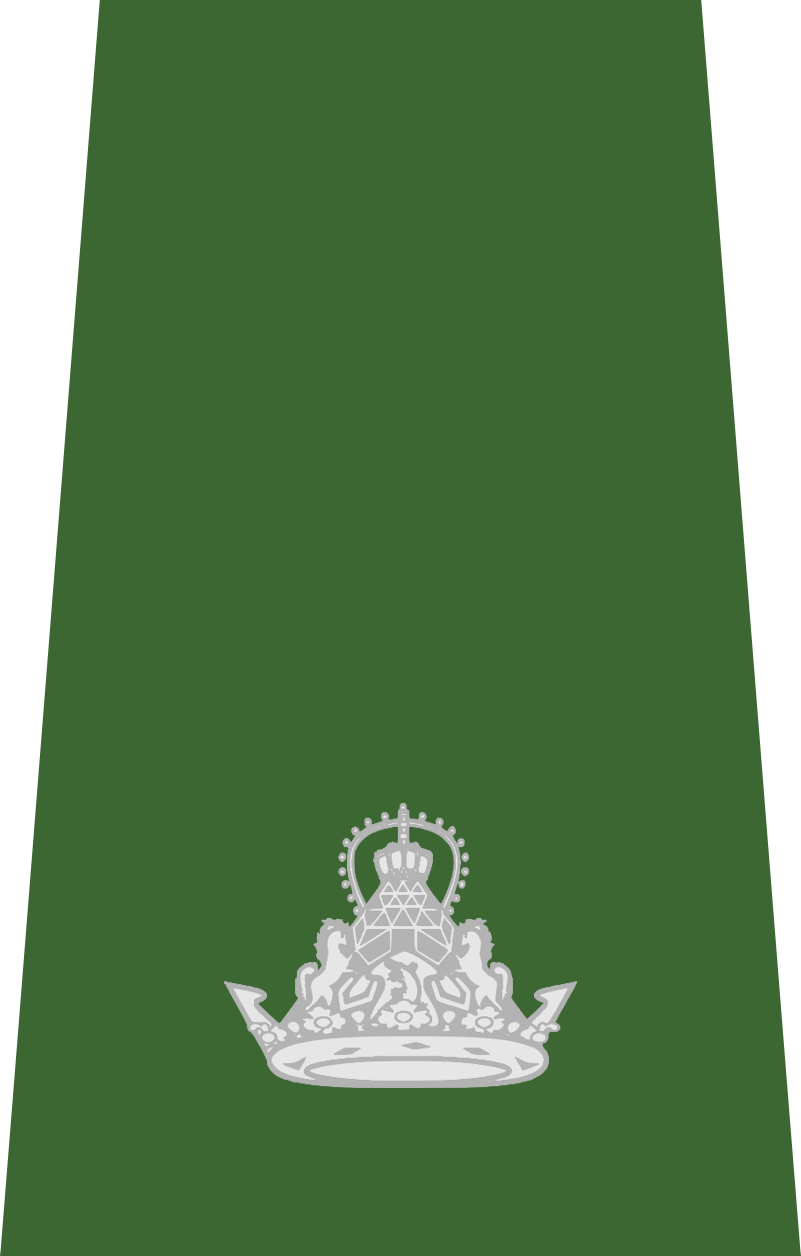
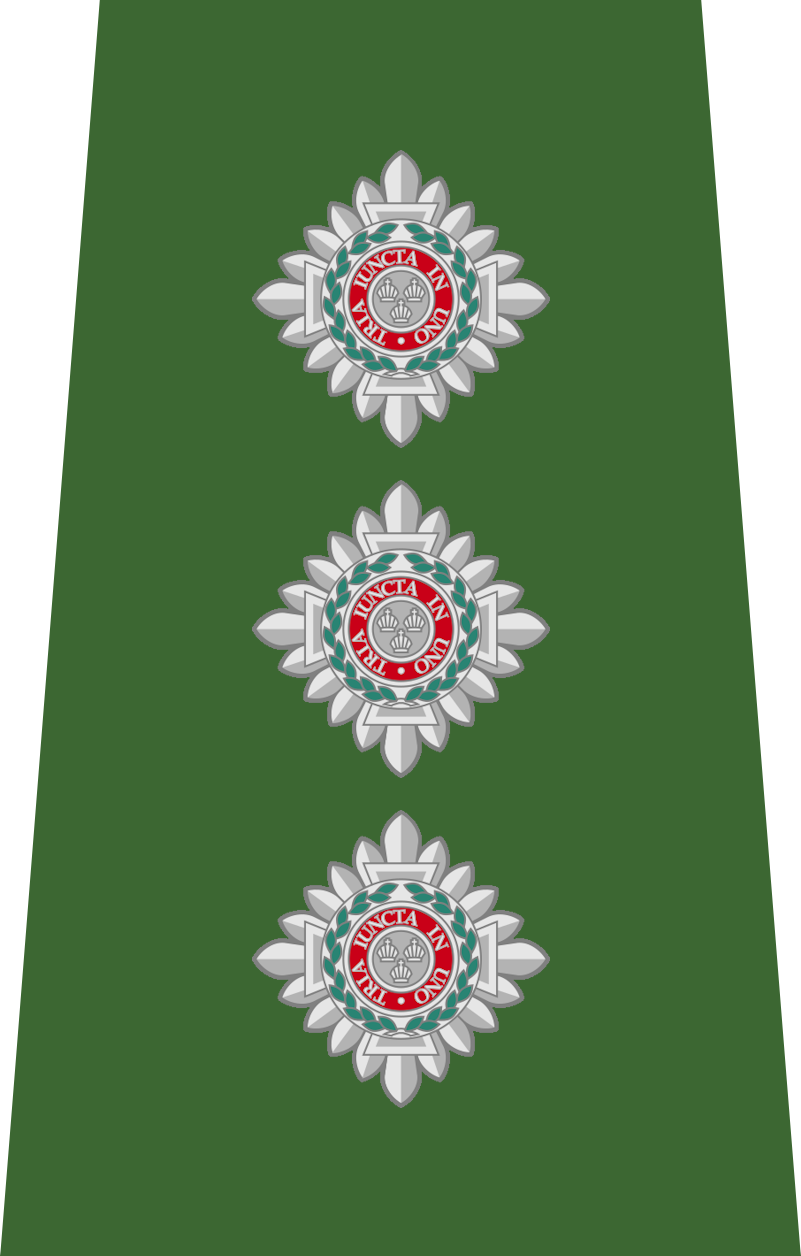
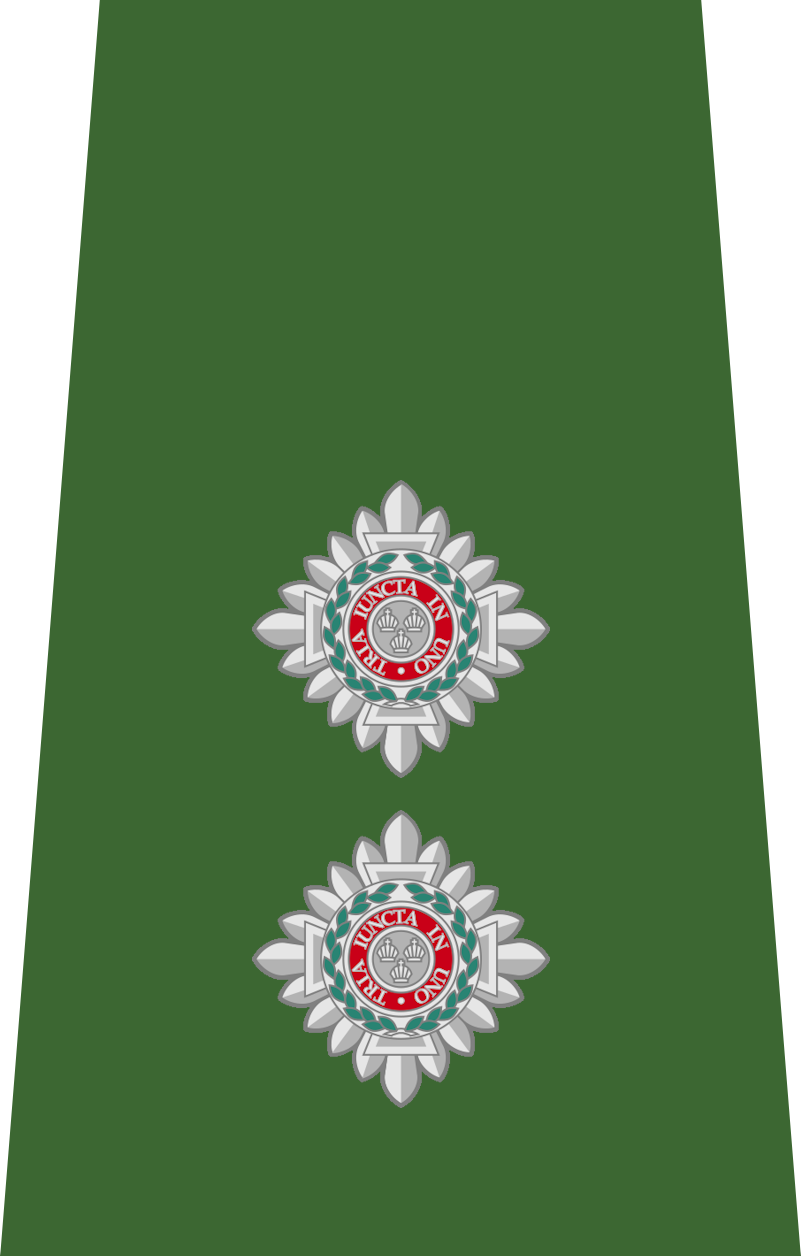
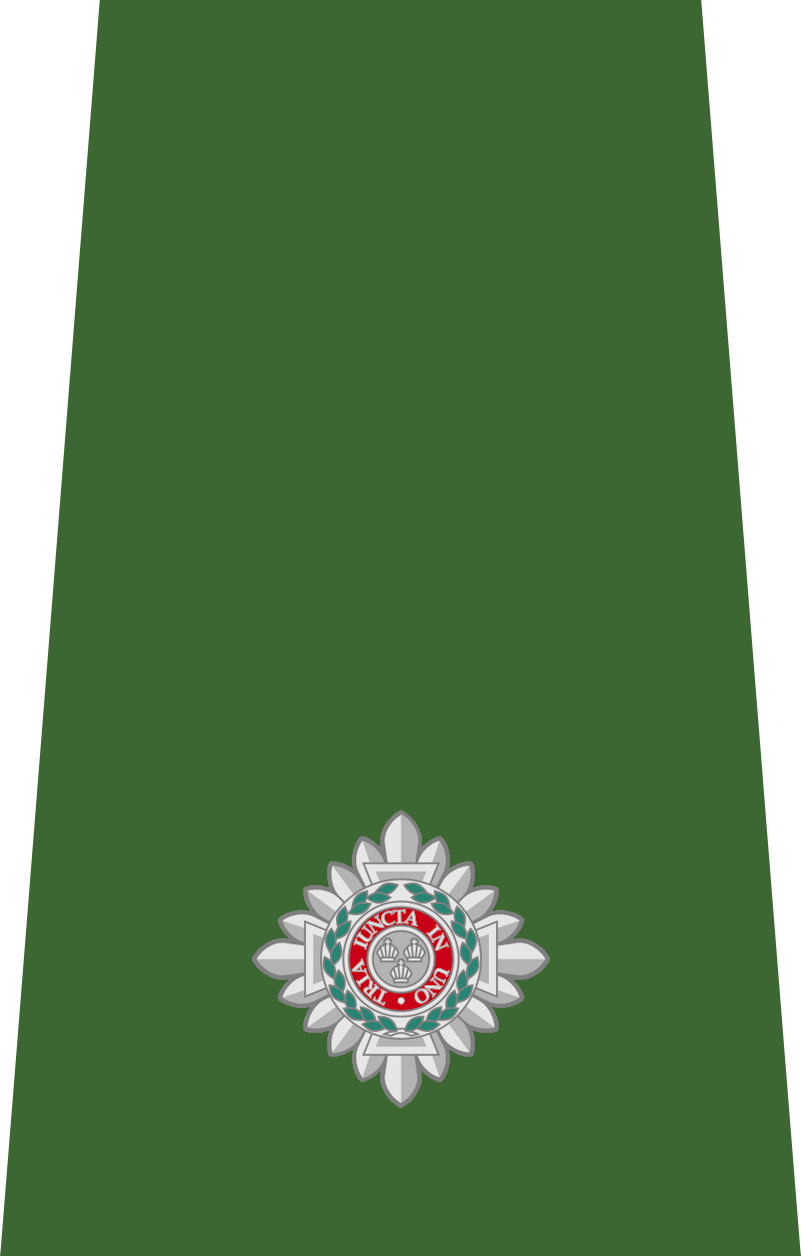
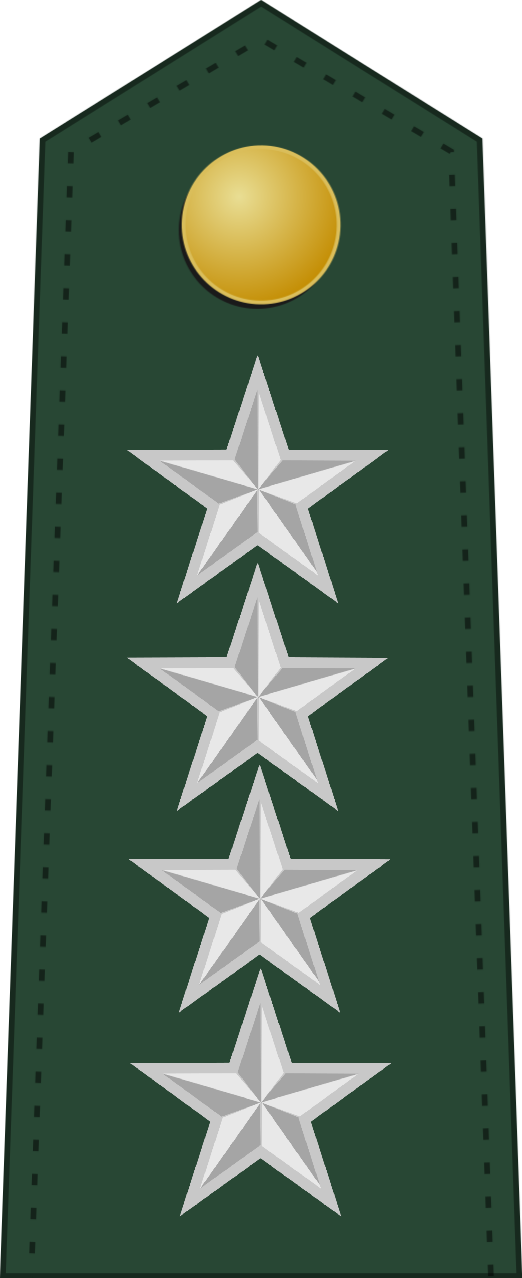
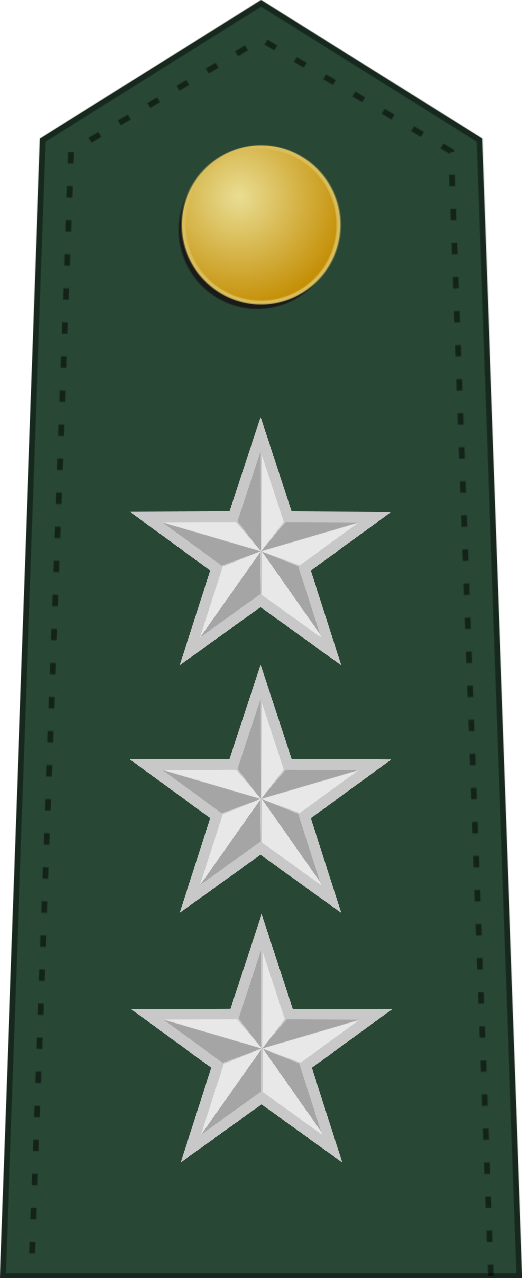
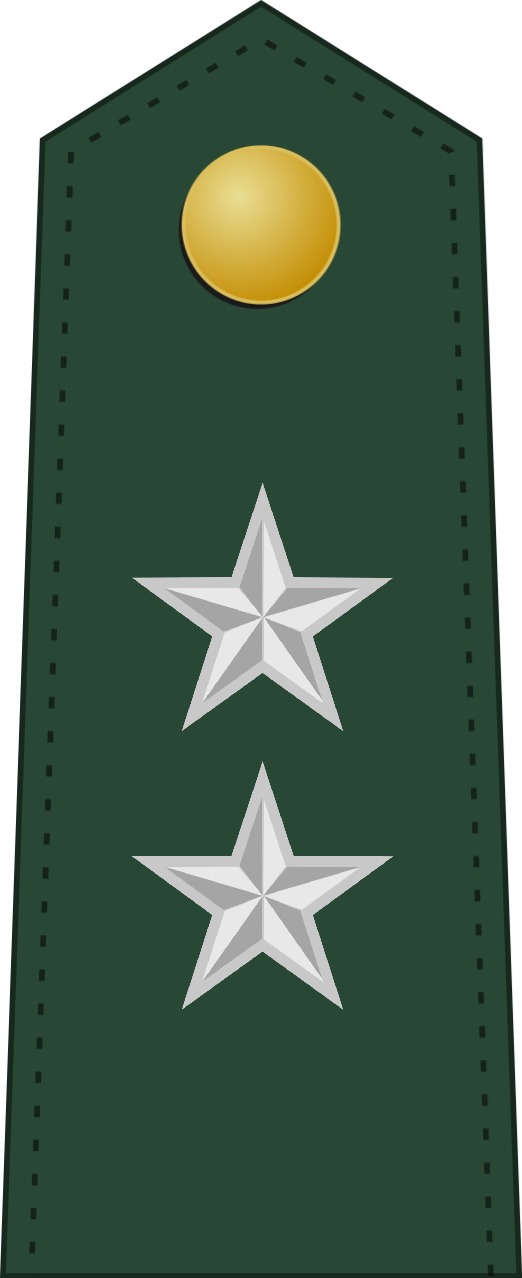
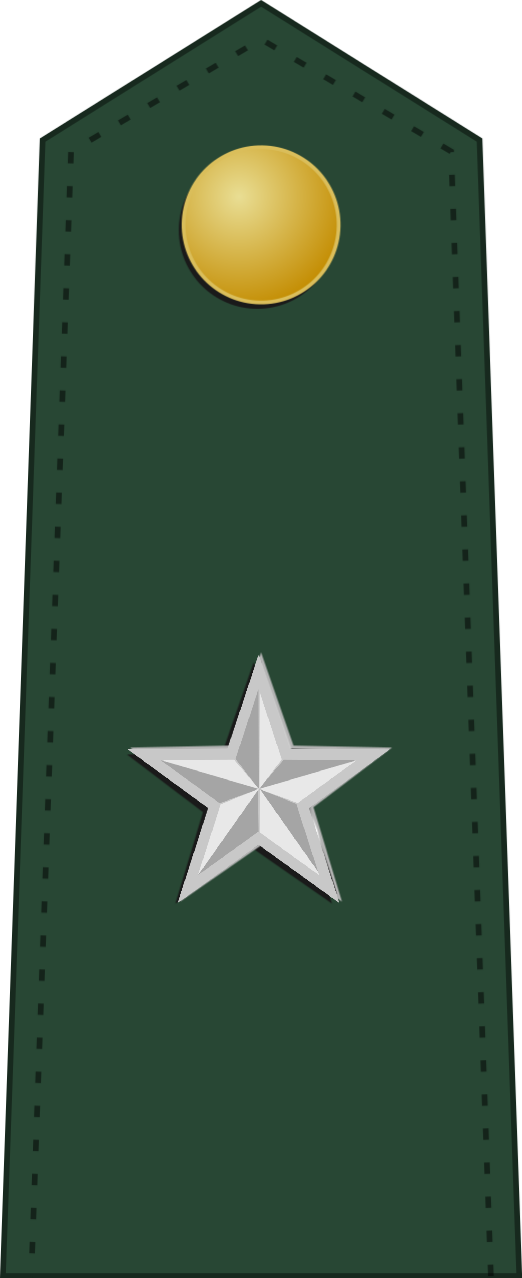
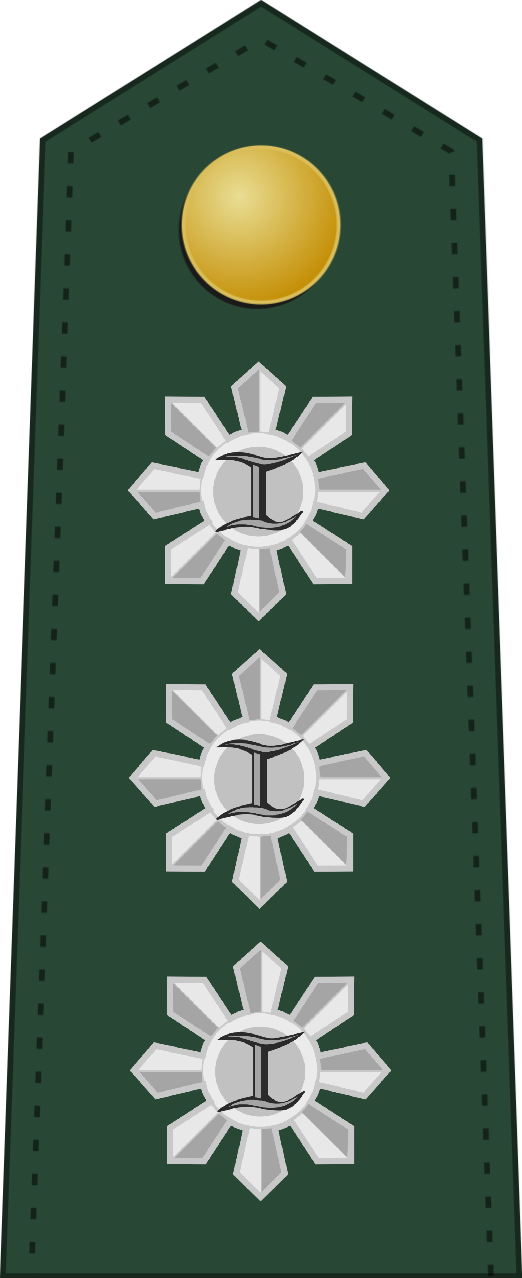
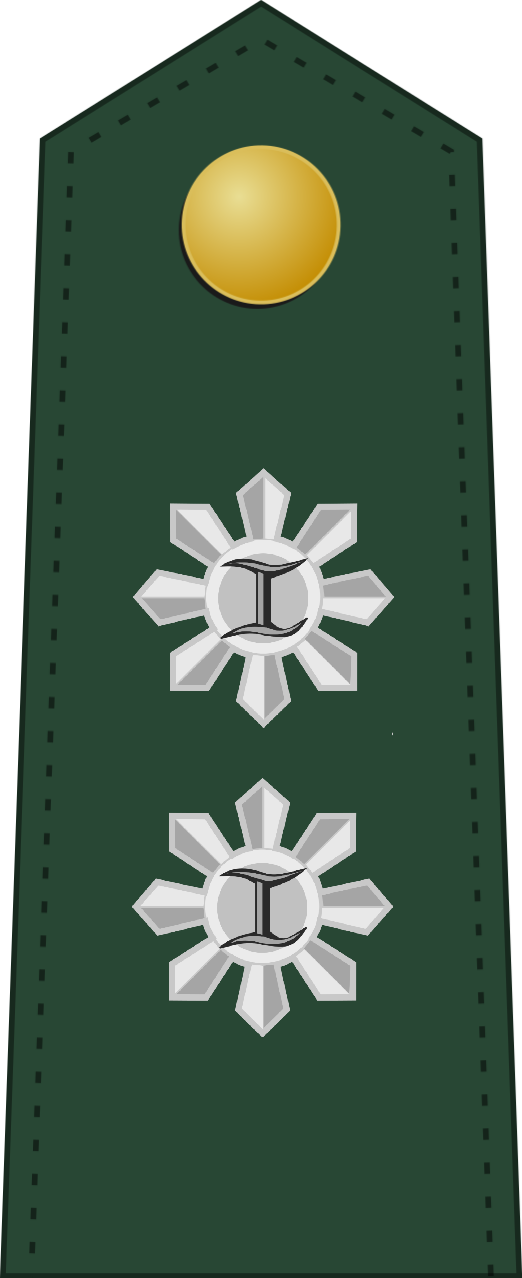
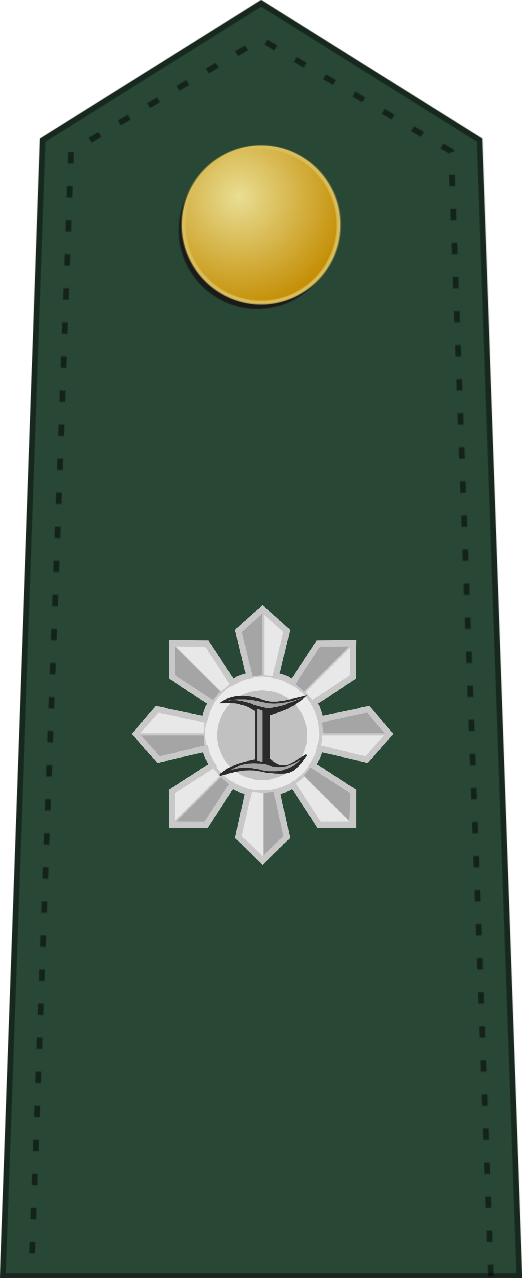
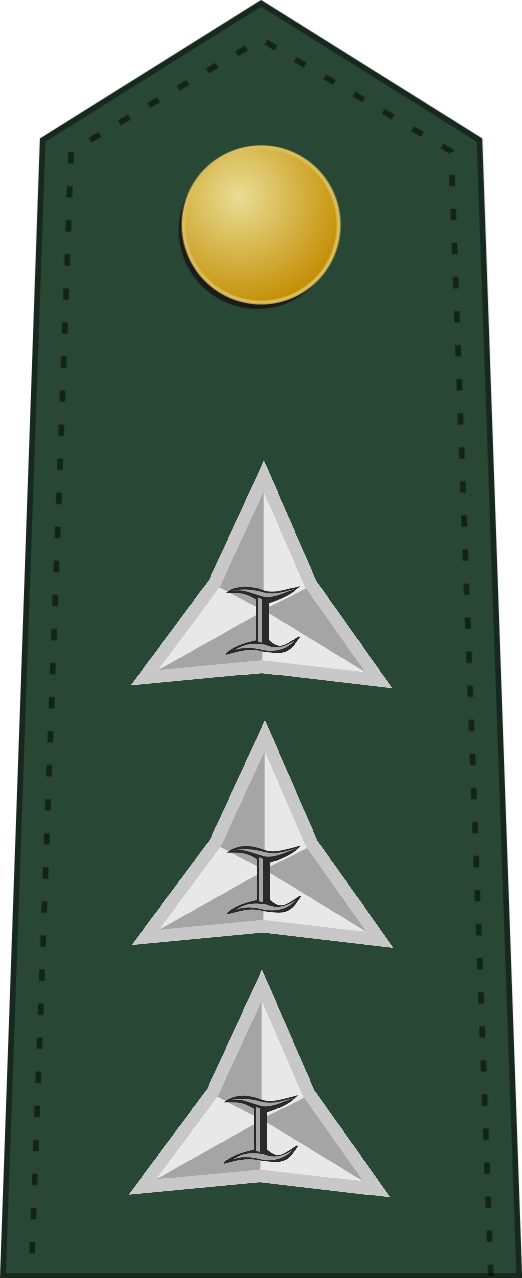
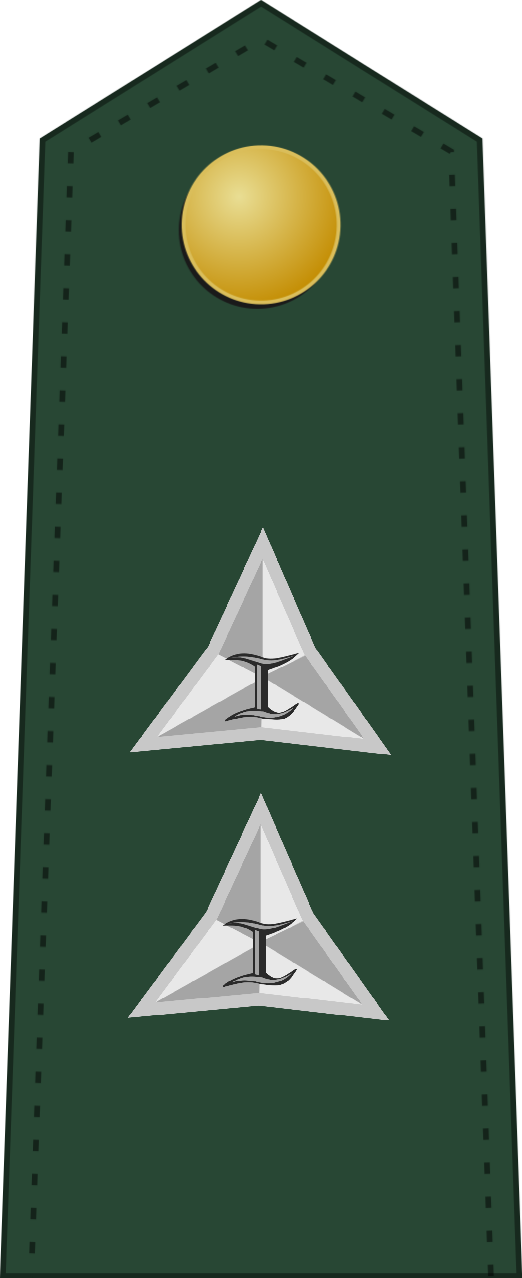
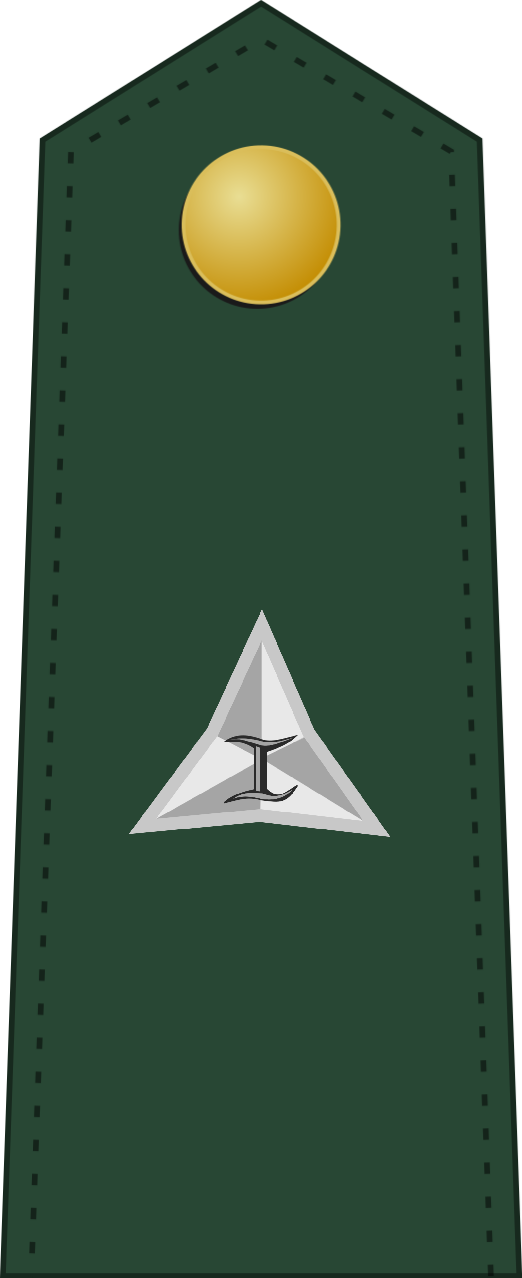
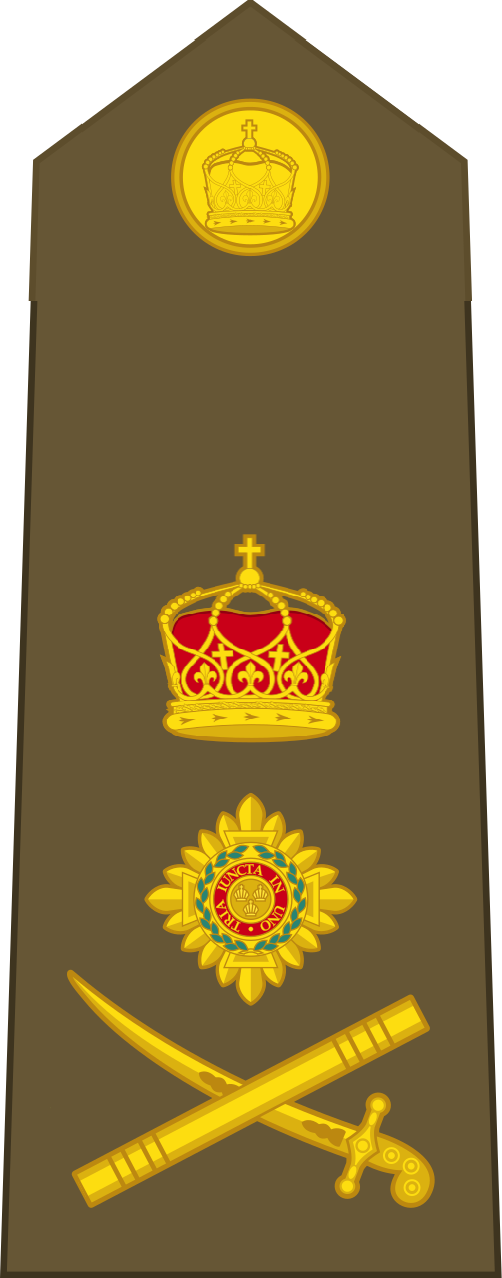
Rank group	General / flag officers					Senior officers				Junior officers
Antigua and Barbuda Regiment
Antigua and Barbuda Regiment						Colonel	Lieutenant colonel		Major	Captain	First lieutenant		Second lieutenant
Australian Army
Australian Army	Field marshal	General	Lieutenant general	Major general	Brigadier	Colonel	Lieutenant colonel		Major	Captain	Lieutenant		Second lieutenant
(The Bahamas) Bahamas	No army
Barbados Regiment
Barbados Regiment				Major general	Brigadier general	Colonel	Lieutenant colonel		Major	Captain	First lieutenant		Second lieutenant
Belize Defence Force
Belize Defence Force				Major-general	Brigadier general	Colonel	Lieutenant colonel		Major	Captain	Lieutenant		Second lieutenant
Botswana Ground Force
Botswana Ground Force			Lieutenant general	Major general	Brigadier	Colonel	Lieutenant colonel		Major	Captain	First lieutenant		Second lieutenant
Burundi Army
Burundi Army		Général	Lieutenant-général	Général-major	Général de brigade	Colonel	Lieutenant-colonel		Major	Capitaine	Lieutenant		Sous-lieutenant
Burundi Army		Jenerai	Riyetena jenerai	Jenerai majoro	Jenerai wa birigade	Koroneri	Riyetena koroneri		Majoro	Kapitene	Riyetena		Suriyetena
Cameroon Ground Forces
Cameroon Ground Forces		Général d'armée	Général de corps	Général de division	Général de brigade	Colonel	Lieutenant-colonel		Commandant	Capitaine	Lieutenant		Sous-lieutenant
Canadian Army
Canadian Army		General	Lieutenant-general	Major-general	Brigadier-general	Colonel	Lieutenant-colonel		Major	Captain	Lieutenant		Second lieutenant
Canadian Army		Général(e)	Lieutenant(e)-général(e)	Major(e)-général(e)	Brigadier(ère)-général(e)	Colonel(le)	Lieutenant(e)-colonel(le)		Major(e)	Capitaine	Lieutenant(e)		Sous-lieutenant(e)
Dominica	No army
Umbutfo Eswatini Defence Force
Umbutfo Eswatini Defence Force	Commander in Chief	General	Lieutenant general	Major general	Brigadier	Colonel	Lieutenant colonel		Major	Captain	Lieutenant		Second lieutenant
Fiji Infantry Regiment
Fiji Infantry Regiment				Major general	Brigadier	Colonel	Lieutenant colonel		Major	Captain	Lieutenant		Second lieutenant
Fiji Infantry Regiment				Jenerali meja	Brigadi	Kanala	Leteni kanala		Meja	Kavetani	Leteni		Ikarua ni leteni
Gambian National Army
Gambian National Army		General	Lieutenant general	Major general	Brigadier general	Colonel	Lieutenant colonel		Major	Captain	First lieutenant		Second lieutenant
Ghana Army
Ghana Army	Field marshal	General	Lieutenant general	Major general	Brigadier	Colonel	Lieutenant colonel		Major	Captain	Lieutenant		Second lieutenant
Grenada	No army
Guyana Army
Guyana Army	Commander-in-Chief	Minister of Defence		Major general	Brigadier	Colonel	Lieutenant colonel		Major	Captain	Lieutenant	Second lieutenant	Ensign
Indian Army
Indian Army	Field marshal फील्ड मार्शल	General जनरल	Lieutenant general लेफ्टिनेंट जनरल	Major general मेजर जनरल	Brigadier ब्रिगेडियर	Colonel कर्नल	Lieutenant colonel लेफ्टिनेंट कर्नल		Major मेजर	Captain कैप्टन	Lieutenant लेफ्टिनेंट
Irish Army
Irish Army			Lieutenant-general	Major-general	Brigadier-general	Colonel	Lieutenant-colonel		Commandant	Captain	Lieutenant		Second-Lieutenant
Irish Army			Lefteanant-ghinearál	Maor-ghinearál	Briogáidire-ghinearál	Cornal	Lefteanant-chornal		Ceannfort	Captaen	Lefteanant		Dara-lefteanant
Jamaican Army
Jamaican Army			Lieutenant general	Major general	Brigadier	Colonel	Lieutenant colonel		Major	Captain	Lieutenant		Second lieutenant
Kenya Army
Kenya Army	Commander-in-Chief	General	Lieutenant general	Major general	Brigadier	Colonel	Lieutenant colonel		Major	Captain	Lieutenant		Second lieutenant
Kiribati	No army
Lesotho Army
Lesotho Army	Field marshal		Lieutenant general	Major general	Brigadier	Colonel	Lieutenant colonel		Major	Captain	Lieutenant		Second lieutenant
Liberian Ground Forces
Liberian Ground Forces			Lieutenant general	Major general	Brigadier general	Colonel	Lieutenant colonel		Major	Captain	First lieutenant		Second lieutenant
Malawi Army
Malawi Army		General	Lieutenant general	Major general	Brigadier	Colonel	Lieutenant colonel		Major	Captain	Lieutenant		Second lieutenant
Army of Malta
Army of Malta					Brigadier; Brigadier	Colonel; Kurunell	Lieutenant colonel Logutenent kurunell		Major; Maġġur	Captain; Kaptan	Lieutenant; Logutenent		Second lieutenant Sekond logutenent
Marshall Islands	No army
Mauritius	No army
Federated States of Micronesia	No army
Namibian Army
Namibian Army		General	Lieutenant general	Major general	Brigadier general	Colonel	Lieutenant colonel		Major	Captain	Lieutenant		Second lieutenant
Nauru	No army
New Zealand Army
New Zealand Army	Field marshal		Lieutenant-general	Major-general	Brigadier	Colonel	Lieutenant-colonel		Major	Captain	Lieutenant		Second lieutenant
Nigerian Army
Nigerian Army	Field marshal	General	Lieutenant general	Major general	Brigadier-general	Colonel	Lieutenant colonel		Major	Captain	Lieutenant		Second lieutenant
Pakistan Army
Pakistan Army	Field marshal فیلڈ مارشل	General جنرل	Lieutenant general لیفٹیننٹ جنرل	Major general میجر جنرل	Brigadier بریگیڈیئر	Colonel کرنل	Lieutenant colonel لیفٹیننٹ کرنل		Major میجر	Captain کیپٹن	Lieutenant لیفٹنینٹ		Second lieutenant سیکنڈ لیفٹیننٹ
Palau	No army
Papua New Guinea Land Element
Papua New Guinea Land Element				Major general	Brigadier general	Colonel	Lieutenant colonel		Major	Captain	First lieutenant		Second lieutenant
Papua New Guinea Land Element				Meja jeneral	Brigadia jeneral	Kolonel	Leftenan kolonel		Meja	Kepten	Leftenan		Namba tu leftenan
Philippine Army
Philippine Army		General	Lieutenant general	Major general	Brigadier general	Colonel	Lieutenant Colonel		Major	Captain	First lieutenant		Second lieutenant
Rwandan Land Forces
Rwandan Land Forces		General	Lieutenant general	Major general	Brigadier general	Colonel	Lieutenant colonel		Major	Captain	Lieutenant		Second lieutenant
SKN Regiment
SKN Regiment							Lieutenant-colonel		Major	Captain	Lieutenant		Second lieutenant
Saint Lucia	No army
Saint Vincent and the Grenadines	No army
Samoa	No army
Seychelles Army
Seychelles Army					Brigadier	Colonel	Lieutenant colonel		Major	Captain	Lieutenant		Second lieutenant
Sierra Leone Army
Sierra Leone Army		General	Lieutenant general	Major general	Brigadier	Colonel	Lieutenant colonel		Major	Captain	First lieutenant		Second lieutenant
Singapore Army		No insignia yet
Singapore Army		General	Lieutenant general	Major general	Brigadier general	Colonel	Senior lieutenant colonel	Lieutenant colonel	Major	Captain	Lieutenant		Second lieutenant
Solomon Islands	No army
South African Army
South African Army		General	Lieutenant general	Major general	Brigadier general	Colonel	Lieutenant colonel		Major	Captain	Lieutenant		Second lieutenant
South Sudan Army
South Sudan Army	Field marshal	General	Lieutenant general	Major general	Brigadier	Colonel	Lieutenant colonel		Major	Captain	First lieutenant		Second lieutenant
Sudanese Army
Sudanese Army	مشیر; Mushir	فريق أول; Fariq 'awal	فريق; Fariq	لواء; Liwa	عميد; Amid	عقيد; Aqid	مقدم; Muqaddam		رائد; Ra'id	نقيب; Naqib	ملازم أول; Mulazim awwal		ملازم; Mulazim
Tanzanian Army
Tanzanian Army		Jenerali	Luteni jenerali	Meja jenerali	Brigedia jenerali	Kanali	Luteni kanali		Meja	Kapteni	Luteni		Luteni usu
Tongan Land Component
Tongan Land Component		Commander-in-chief			Brigadier general	Colonel	Lieutenant colonel		Major	Captain	Lieutenant		Ensign
Tongan Land Component		Komanitā-pule			Pilikaria seniale	Kenolo	Lafitani kenolo		Mesia	Kapiteni	Lafitani		Lafitani ua
Trinidad and Tobago Regiment
Trinidad and Tobago Regiment				Major general	Brigadier general	Colonel	Lieutenant colonel		Major	Captain	Lieutenant		Second lieutenant
Tuvalu	No army
Ugandan Land Forces
Ugandan Land Forces		General	Lieutenant general	Major general	Brigadier general	Colonel	Lieutenant colonel		Major	Captain	Lieutenant		Second lieutenant
British Army
British Army	Field marshal	General	Lieutenant-general	Major-general	Brigadier	Colonel	Lieutenant colonel		Major	Captain	Lieutenant		Second lieutenant
United States Army
United States Army	General of the Army	General	Lieutenant general	Major general	Brigadier general	Colonel	Lieutenant colonel		Major	Captain	First lieutenant		Second lieutenant
Vanuatu Mobile Forces
Vanuatu Mobile Forces				Major general Bigfala Jenerol	Brigadier	Colonel; Kolonel	Lieutenant colonel Lietnen Kolonel		Major; Bigfala	Captain; Kapten	First lieutenant Fas Lietnen		Second lieutenant Seken Lietnen
Zambian Army
Zambian Army		General	Lieutenant general	Major general	Brigadier	Colonel	Lieutenant colonel		Major	Captain	Lieutenant		Second lieutenant
Zimbabwe National Army
Zimbabwe National Army		General	Lieutenant general	Major general	Brigadier	Colonel	Lieutenant colonel		Major	Captain	Lieutenant		Second lieutenant
Rank group	General / flag officers					Senior officers				Junior officers
