= Third warrant officer =

Third warrant officer (3WO) is a warrant officer rank in the Singapore Armed Forces. It is the most junior of the warrant officers, and holders of this rank are given appointments such as company sergeant major. The rank was newly introduced on 14 May 2009, and went into effect on 1 April 2010, as part of a revised career structure for warrant officers. The rank insignia is similar to the one for second warrant officer, although the former has a finer chevron.

Master sergeants are promoted to third warrant officer after attending the 3WO Professional Leadership Course.

== See also ==
- Singapore Armed Forces ranks
- Specialist (Singapore)

Warrant officer ranks of the Singapore Armed Forces
Insignia						
Rank	Third Warrant Officer	Second Warrant Officer	First Warrant Officer	Master Warrant Officer	Senior Warrant Officer	Chief Warrant Officer
Abbreviation	3WO	2WO	1WO	MWO	SWO	CWO
