= George Chow (Canadian Army soldier) =

Canadian military veteran (1921–2020)

Master Warrant Officer George Chow CD
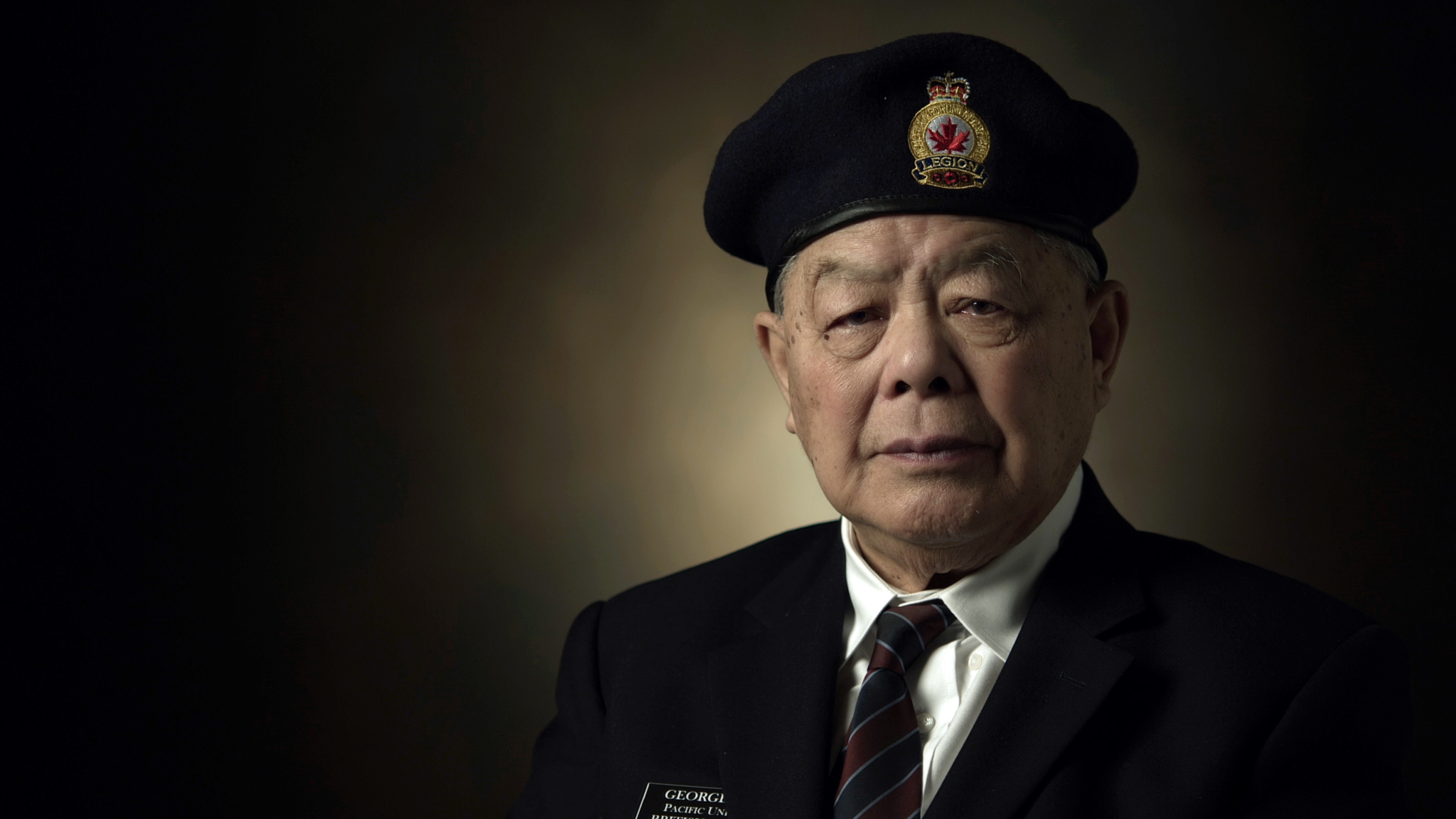
- Chow in 2010
- Born: November 5, 1921; Victoria, British Columbia, Canada
- Died: November 6, 2020 (aged 99)
- Military career
- Allegiance: Canada
- Branch: Canadian Army
- Service years: 1940–1963
- Rank: Master Warrant Officer
- Unit: Royal Regiment of Canadian Artillery
- Conflicts: World War II; Invasion of Normandy
- Awards: Canadian Forces' Decoration; Chevalier of the Legion of Honour

George Chow (5 November 1921 – 6 November 2020) was a Canadian veteran and one of about 600 Chinese Canadians who served in the Second World War.

Born in Victoria, British Columbia, Chow enlisted in August 1940 and was assigned to the 16th Light Anti-Aircraft Battery. The battery was shipped from Windsor, Ontario to England; at a base in Colchester, Chow was part of the "first all-Canadian gun crew to shoot down a German plane". He also met and married an Englishwoman who would return to Canada with him and their children after the war. Chow landed in France during Operation Overlord and participated in the liberation of Europe.

After the war Chow served as a gunnery instructor with the 43rd Heavy Anti-Aircraft Regiment in Vancouver and was honourably discharged in 1963 at the rank of Master Warrant Officer. He regularly toured schools to teach students about Remembrance Day.

For his service he was made a Knight of the National Order of the Legion of Honour by the French government and received the Queen's Diamond Jubilee Medal. On his death, the Minister for National Defence, Harjit Sajjan, posted that "We have lost a trailblazer who broke barriers and showed young children what service, duty and love for one's country are".
