= Master sergeant =

Military rank

Master sergeant is the military rank of a senior non-commissioned officer in the armed forces of some countries.

== Israel Defense Forces ==
The רב-סמל ראשון rav samal rishon (abbreviated "rasar", master sergeant) is a non-commissioned officer (נגדים) rank in the Israel Defense Forces (IDF). Because the IDF is an integrated force, they have a unique rank structure. IDF ranks are the same in all services (army, navy and air force). The ranks are derived from those of the paramilitary Haganah developed in the British Mandate of Palestine period to protect the Yishuv. This origin is reflected in the slightly compacted IDF rank structure.

Israel Defense Forces ranks : נגדים nagadim - non-commissioned officers (NCO)
IDF NCO rank	רב-נגד; Rav nagad	רב-סמל בכיר; Rav samal bakhír	רב-סמל מתקדם; Rav samal mitkadem	רב-סמל ראשון; Rav samal rishon	רב-סמל; Rav samal
Abbreviation	רנ"ג; Ranag	רס"ב; Rasab	רס"מ; Rasam	רס"ר; Rasar	רס"ל; Rasal
Corresponding rank	Chief warrant officer	Command sergeant major	Sergeant major	Master sergeant	Sergeant first class
Insignia					

== Philippines ==
Master sergeant is used by the Armed Forces of the Philippines as a non-commissioned officer rank. It is used by the Philippine Army, Philippine Air Force and the Philippine Marine Corps (under the Philippine Navy). The rank is below Senior master sergeant and above Technical sergeant.

As of February 8, 2019, a new ranking classification for the Philippine National Police was adopted, eliminating confusion of old ranks. Master sergeant is one of the new classification for non-commissioned officer rank. The rank stands above the Police Staff sergeant and below the Police Senior master sergeant.

== Singapore ==
=== Singapore Armed Forces ===
In the Singapore Armed Forces (SAF), master sergeant is the highest rank amongst the specialist corps, ranking above staff sergeant and below third warrant officer. In the Singapore Army, master sergeants are usually instructors, staff specialists, or sergeants major of battalion or company-sized units. They are addressed as "master" or "master sergeant".

Specialist ranks of the Singapore Armed Forces
Insignia					
Rank	Third sergeant	Second sergeant	First sergeant	Staff sergeant	Master sergeant
Abbreviation	3SG	2SG	1SG	SSG	MSG

=== National Cadet Corps ===
In the National Cadet Corps (NCC), the rank of master sergeant is awarded to outstanding NCC cadets who have contributed greatly to their unit. The insignia of MSG (NCC) is the same as the SAF's, except that the letters 'NCC' are below the insignia, to differentiate SAF and NCC master sergeants.

== United States ==
Master sergeant
- Army and Marine insignia

- Air Force and Space Force insignia
- Country: United States
- Service branch: U.S. Army; U.S. Marine Corps; U.S. Air Force; U.S. Space Force
- Abbreviation: MSG (USA); MSgt (USMC, USAF, USSF, & CAP)
- Rank group: Non-commissioned officer
- NATO rank code: OR-8 (USA & USMC); OR-7 (USAF, USSF, & CAP)
- Pay grade: E-8 (USA & USMC); E-7 (USAF, USSF, & CAP)
- Next higher rank: First Sergeant (USA); Master gunnery sergeant (USMC); Sergeant major (USMC); Senior master sergeant (USAF, USSF, & CAP)
- Next lower rank: Sergeant first class (USA); Gunnery sergeant (USMC); Technical sergeant (USAF, USSF, & CAP)

Master sergeant is a senior non-commissioned officer rank used within the United States Armed Forces by the United States Army (E-8), Marine Corps (E-8), Air Force (E-7), and Space Force (E-7). The Civil Air Patrol also has the rank of master sergeant.

=== U.S. Army ===
Master sergeant (MSG) is the eighth enlisted grade (E-8), ranking above sergeant first class and below sergeant major, command sergeant major, Sergeant Major of the Army, and equal in grade but not authority to a first sergeant. It is abbreviated as MSG and indicated by three chevrons above three inverted arcs, commonly referred to as "rockers."

A master sergeant may be assigned as a battalion or brigade-level section noncommissioned officer in charge and serves as the subject matter expert in their field, but may also hold other positions depending on the type of unit. Unlike the Air Force, an Army master sergeant can not serve in a first sergeant's billet, but with the correct training they can be promoted to first sergeant.

When holding the position of first sergeant, called frocking, the master sergeant is referred to as "first sergeant"; however, when not in the position of first sergeant, master sergeants are addressed as "sergeant". This is the standard address for all pay grades E-5 through E-8. A master sergeant is often called "top" or "top kick," referring to the fact that they were once the highest rank in the enlisted grades.

In 1920, the Army combined several regimental level "staff" NCO ranks, including four grades of sergeant major, three grades of quartermaster sergeant, regimental supply sergeant, senior ordnance sergeant, senior band sergeant, four grades of senior master sergeant, and seven additional master-level technical and specialist ranks into the new master sergeant rank. Master sergeant then became the senior enlisted rank, ranking above technical sergeant and first sergeant (a positional rank/title for the senior technical sergeant in a company/battery/troop), while "sergeant major" became a "courtesy title" for the senior master sergeant in a battalion/squadron or higher headquarters.

In 1942, the rank of first sergeant was elevated one grade and was then considered as a junior version of master sergeant, because while first sergeants served as senior NCOs at the company/battery/troop level, master sergeants held positions as the senior NCO in their MOS at battalion/squadron and higher level headquarters. In 1958, both first sergeant and master sergeant were elevated one grade to the new E-8 pay grade, while the rank of sergeant major was restored as the senior enlisted rank at the new pay grade of E-9.

=== U.S. Marine Corps ===
The eighth enlisted grade, ranking above gunnery sergeant and below master gunnery sergeant, sergeant major, and Sergeant Major of the Marine Corps. It is equal in grade to first sergeant, and is abbreviated MSgt. In the U.S. Marine Corps, master sergeants provide technical leadership as occupational specialists at the E-8 level. The rank was created in 1946 after World War II.

Gunnery Sergeants (E-7) must choose between becoming a master sergeant or a first sergeant. While they are both E-8 billets, once a marine starts down either path, they continue on that path. Master sergeants can be promoted to master gunnery sergeants and first sergeants to sergeant major. They are not interchangeable as they are in the U.S. Army. This was true until January 2026, when the USMC transitioned nine master sergeants to first sergeant in an E-8 redesignation program in both the active and reserve forces. The E-8 redesignation program involves training to ensure that new first sergeants are capable of leading larger groups of Marines and advocating for them, while maintaining discipline and military conduct. The USMC has announced that in 2027 they plan to pilot a program to allow first sergeants to transition to master sergeant for greater flexibility.

Most infantry master sergeants serve as the operations chief of a weapons company or PMOS 0369 Infantry Unit Leader, in place of the gunnery sergeant found in the company headquarters of a rifle company. Infantry master sergeants also serve as the assistant operations chief in the S-3 section of the headquarters of an infantry regiment and Marine Expeditionary Unit and in the G-3 section of the headquarters of a Marine Expeditionary Brigade. The Marine division and Marine Expeditionary Force headquarters contains two infantry master sergeants, one as the training SNCO and the other as the readiness chief.

Outside of the infantry, master sergeants serve as SNCOICs of the ordnance and avionics divisions in the aircraft maintenance department or as section chief/SNCOIC of their MOS type staff section in a battalion or higher level headquarters.

Only in the Marine Corps are master sergeants required to be addressed by their full rank. In the Marine Corps, master sergeants may be referred to by the nickname of "Top". This usage is an informal one, however, and would not be used in an official or formal setting. Use of this nickname by Marines of subordinate rank is at the rank holder's discretion.

In the U.S. Armed Forces, all master sergeants (Army, Air Force, and Marine Corps) are senior non-commissioned officers (i.e., pay grades E-7 through E-9). However, in the U.S. Marine Corps, the non-commissioned officer ranks of staff sergeant and above, are classified as Staff Non-Commissioned Officers (SNCOs), a classification that is unique in U.S. usage to the USMC.

=== U.S. Air Force ===
Air Force master sergeant

Air Force master sergeant serving as first sergeant

Obsolete master sergeant insignia
(until 1991)

The seventh enlisted grade, ranking above technical sergeant and below senior master sergeant. It is abbreviated as MSgt. Advancement to master sergeant is one of the most significant promotions within the enlisted Air Force and Space Force. At the rank of master sergeant, the airman enters the senior non-commissioned tier and transitions his or her duties from front line technicians and supervisors to operational leaders. An operational leader develops his or her leadership and management skills since this rank carries increased broad leadership, supervisory, and managerial responsibilities rather than technical performance.

Per Air Force Instruction 36–2618, master sergeants do serve in positions as squadron superintendents, flight chiefs, section chiefs, and non-commissioned Officer in Charge (NCOIC). Air Force first sergeants occupy the pay grades of E-7 through E-9 and are referred to officially as "first sergeant" regardless of pay grade, and unofficially as "first shirt" or "shirt".

In 1991, the Air Force changed its NCO insignia so that a maximum of five stripes, or rockers, were placed on the bottom of the chevrons. The master sergeant rank insignia was changed by removing the bottom (sixth) rocker, and relocating it above as a single chevron, on top of the five lower stripes. The single chevron above visually identifies Senior NCO status for E-7 master sergeants along with two chevrons above for E-8 senior master sergeants and three chevrons above for E-9 chief master sergeants in the Air Force NCO insignia. In 2015, the Air Force announced its promotion overhaul and newly established boards for master sergeant.

==== Civil Air Patrol ====
Insignia of a Civil Air Patrol master sergeant

The Civil Air Patrol (CAP), a non-profit corporation Congressionally chartered to operate as the civilian auxiliary of the U.S. Air Force, has a quasi-military structure which includes the rank of master sergeant. The grade of master sergeant is below senior master sergeant and above technical sergeant. Former military enlisted personnel who held the rank of master sergeant in the United States Armed Forces may retain that rank as members of the CAP.

=== U.S. Space Force ===
On February 1, 2021, the United States Space Force announced its permanent rank structure, establishing the grade of master sergeant as its permanent E-7 grade. This continued its usage from the Air Force. The grade of master sergeant is above technical sergeant and beneath senior master sergeant.

== Gallery ==
Master sergeant
(Liberian Ground Forces)

Master sergeant
(Philippine Army)

Master sergeant
(Singapore Army)

Майстер-сержант
Maister-serzhant
(Ukrainian Ground Forces)

Master sergeant
(United States Army)

== See also ==
- Comparative military ranks
- United States military pay
