= Military ranks of Singapore =

The Singapore Armed Forces (SAF) has five rank schemes for active and reservist personnel, with a sixth for the auxiliaries of the SAF Volunteer Corps. The SAF has a unique rank structure as an integrated force, ranks are the same in the Singapore Army, the Republic of Singapore Navy (RSN), the Republic of Singapore Air Force (RSAF), and the Digital and Intelligence Service (DIS).

== History ==
Like many Commonwealth countries, the SAF draws its heritage from the British military; however, Singapore no longer uses British-style rank insignia across its armed services and also does not use the corresponding Royal Navy and Royal Air Force rank titles for its navy and air force. The three branches of the SAF were unified in 1972, but before 1982, the three component services maintained their own distinct sets of uniform insignia, particularly for officer-level ranks. In 1982, the SAF implemented identical rank insignia across all three services along with a new service dress uniform. Rank titles are also largely identical, with only two exceptions in the Republic of Singapore Navy, where general officers have admiral ranks while officer cadets are referred to as midshipmen.

== Rank structure ==
The ranks of uniformed personnel are outlined in the Singapore Armed Forces (Ranks of Servicemen) Regulations. While the legislation provides for the ranks of general and admiral, there have not been any holders of these ranks as of 2023, and their rank insignia are not known. As below is a list of ranks prescribed by legislation, arranged in order of increasing seniority.

List of military ranks according to the Singapore Armed Forces (Ranks of Servicemen) Regulations
| Category | Rank | Military expert rank |
|---|---|---|
| Enlistees | Recruit (REC) | |
| Enlistees | Private (PTE) | |
| Enlistees | Private First Class (PFC) | |
| Enlistees | Lance Corporal (LCP) | |
| Enlistees | Corporal (CPL) | |
| Enlistees | Corporal First Class (CFC) | |
| Specialists | Third Sergeant (3SG) | |
| Specialists | Second Sergeant (2SG) | ME1 (Military Expert 1) |
| Specialists | First Sergeant (1SG) | |
| Specialists | Staff Sergeant (SSG) | |
| Specialists | Master Sergeant (MSG) | ME2 (Military Expert 2) |
| Warrant officers | Third Warrant Officer (3WO) | |
| Warrant officers | Second Warrant Officer (2WO) | |
| Warrant officers | First Warrant Officer (1WO) | ME3 (Military Expert 3) |
| Warrant officers | Master Warrant Officer (MWO) | |
| Warrant officers | Senior Warrant Officer (SWO) | |
| Warrant officers | Chief Warrant Officer (CWO) | |
| Junior officers | Second Lieutenant (2LT) | |
| Junior officers | Lieutenant (LTA) | |
| Junior officers | Captain (CPT) | ME4 (Military Expert 4) |
| Field officers | Major (MAJ) | ME5 (Military Expert 5) |
| Field officers | Lieutenant-Colonel (LTC) | ME6 (Military Expert 6) |
| Field officers | Senior Lieutenant-Colonel (SLTC) | |
| Field officers | Colonel (COL) | ME7 (Military Expert 7) |
| General officers | Brigadier-General/Rear-Admiral one-star (BG/RADM(1)) | ME8 (Military Expert 8) |
| General officers | Major-General/Rear-Admiral two-star (MG/RADM(2)) | ME9 (Military Expert 9) |
| General officers | Lieutenant-General/Vice-Admiral (LG/VADM) | |
| General officers | General/Admiral (GEN/ADM) | |

=== Enlistees ===
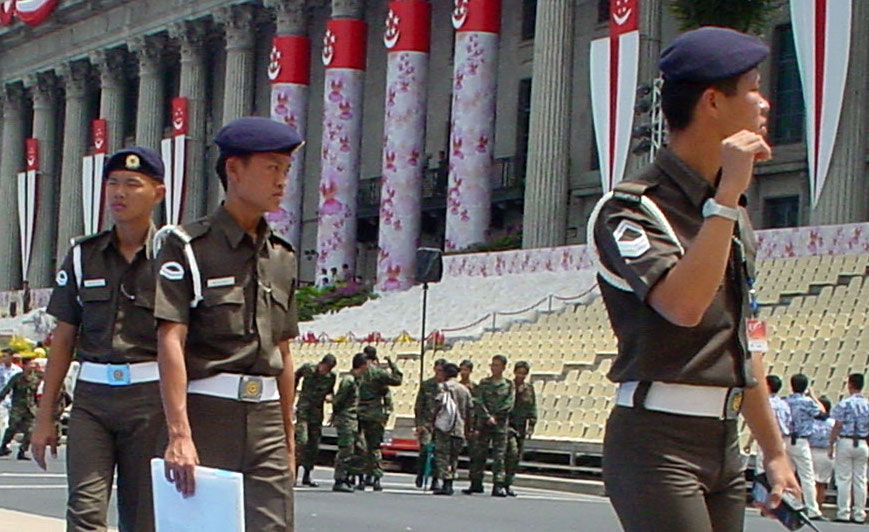
Two corporals (left) and a first sergeant (right) from the Singapore Armed Forces Provost Unit providing security cover for the 2000 National Day Parade at the Padang, Singapore.

Enlistees make up the bulk of manpower in the SAF and comprise the majority of full-time national servicemen. All new soldiers in the SAF, also known as enlistees, must first undergo Basic Military Training (BMT), during which they hold the most basic rank of recruit (REC) until they complete their training. Once recruits graduate from their BMT they attain the rank of private (PTE). Selected recruits may also be chosen for further leadership training at the Specialist Cadet School or Officer Cadet School after graduating from BMT to become future specialists or officers respectively. Conscripts who do not complete BMT will continue to hold the rank of recruit and may attain the rank of private only at the end of their 2 years of active service.

Recruits and privates of all armed services do not wear any rank insignia. Privates can be further promoted to the ranks of private (first class) (PFC), lance corporal (LCP), corporal (CPL), and corporal (first class) (CFC), if they perform well.

Enlistee ranks of the Singapore Armed Forces
| Insignia | No insignia | No insignia | | | | |
| Rank | Recruit | Private | Private first class | Lance corporal | Corporal | Corporal first class |
| Abbreviation | REC | PTE | PFC | LCP | CPL | CFC |

=== Specialists ===
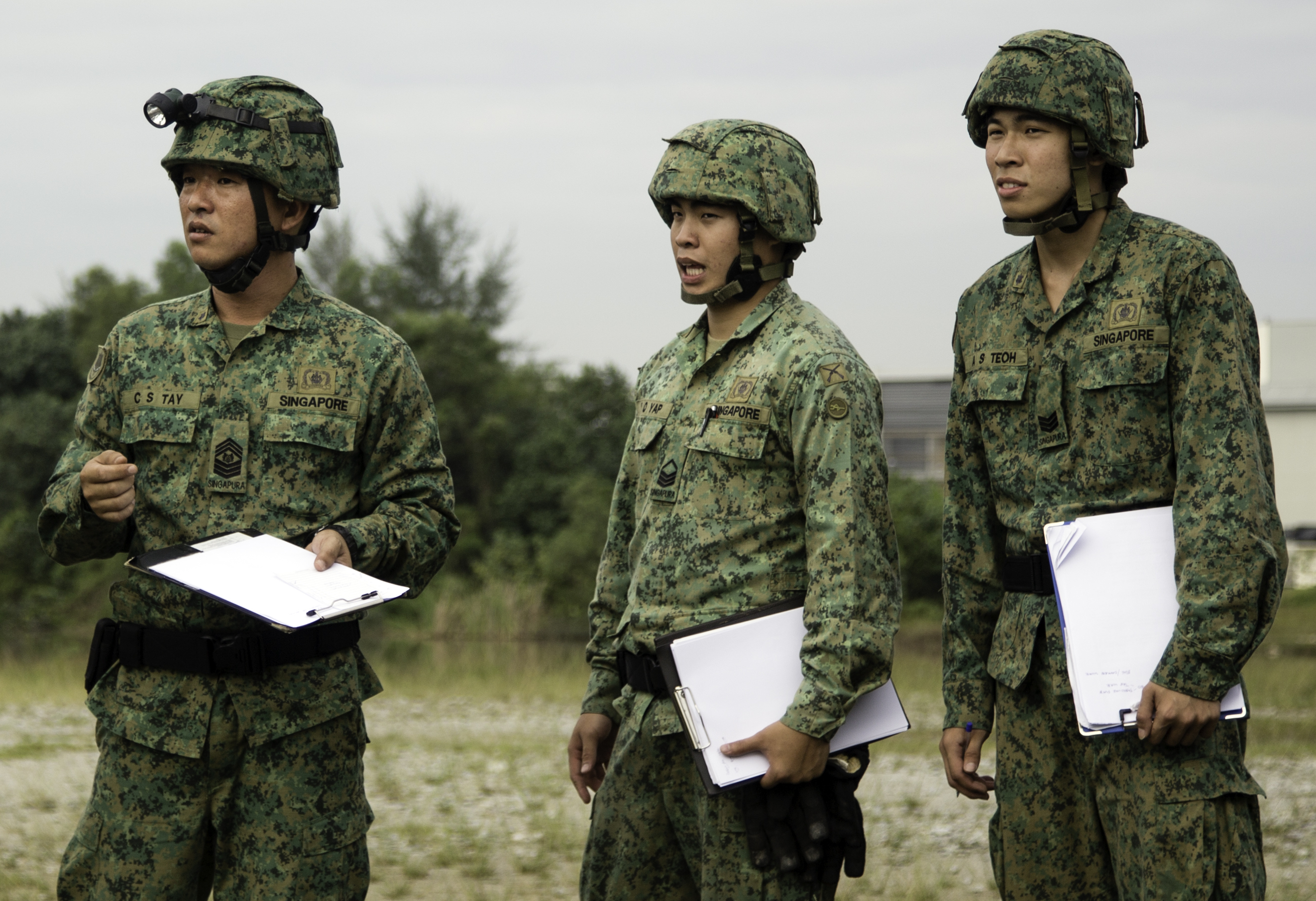
Master Sergeant Tay (left) with a second sergeant (centre) and third sergeant (right) of the 36th Battalion, Singapore Combat Engineers

Specialists serve as the junior commanders in the Singapore Armed Forces. They are specifically trained in a variety of equipment and skills and are considered "subject matter experts". They take responsibility for leading and training small units and work together with commissioned officers. The specialist corps (as well as the warrant officer corps) were introduced in 1992 to replace the previous non-commissioned officer corps.

Potential specialists are selected while training as recruits during BMT and, following graduation, undergo further training at the Specialist Cadet School (SCS). Since 22 December 2008, all specialist trainees bear the rank of specialist cadet (SCT) while undergoing specialist training. This rank is considered equivalent to a private, and is worn until they graduate from SCS, upon which they attain the rank of third sergeant (3SG). Servicemen may subsequently be promoted to second sergeant (2SG) and first sergeant (1SG). Regular personnel may progress further to the staff-level ranks of staff sergeant (SSG) or master sergeant (MSG). The master sergeant is the pinnacle rank of the specialist corps.

Specialists in general are addressed as "Sergeant", while staff sergeants are addressed as "Staff" and master sergeants as "Master".

The rank insignia of specialists consists of three downward-pointing chevrons for the lowest rank of third sergeant, with additional upward-pointing chevrons depending on their seniority. In addition, staff-level ranks contain a coat of arms of Singapore between the upward-pointing and downward-pointing chevrons.

Specialist ranks of the Singapore Armed Forces
| Insignia | | | | | |
| Rank | Third sergeant | Second sergeant | First sergeant | Staff sergeant | Master sergeant |
| Abbreviation | 3SG | 2SG | 1SG | SSG | MSG |

Specialist cadet ranks
| Insignia | |
| Rank | Specialist Cadet |
| Abbreviation | SCT |

=== Warrant officers ===
Warrant officers serve as senior mentors and disciplinarians in units as well as training institutes. Warrant officers are appointed by the Armed Forces Council (AFC), and may be given command responsibility of units and serve as disciplinary or investigating officers for military offences. In addition, they may only be charged for military offences by superior commanders. Like officers, they may also carry ceremonial swords on parades, and wear their ranks on their shoulder epaulettes.

Warrant officers are typically promoted from the ranks of specialists and generally have more than ten years of service, although outstanding specialists can attain the rank of third warrant officer as soon as seven years into service. Senior specialists are trained at the SAFWOS Leadership School (SAFWOS) before becoming warrant officers, and selected operationally-ready national servicemen may also be selected for warrant officer rank.

While technically ranking below commissioned officers, warrant officers are addressed by other soldiers (including commissioned officers, junior specialists, or enlisted personnel) as "Encik" or "Sir" for men and "Cik" or "Ma'am" for women, in respect of their experience and knowledge.

The rank insignia of a third warrant officer (3WO) consists of a coat of arms of Singapore with an arc below and a thin upward-pointing chevron, while that of a second warrant officer (2WO) through to senior warrant officer (SWO) have a thicker chevron which varies in number according to the rank. Finally, the rank of chief warrant officer (CWO) is distinguished from the rank of senior warrant officer with the addition of a laurel.

Warrant officer ranks of the Singapore Armed Forces
| Insignia | | | | | | |
| Rank | Third Warrant Officer | Second Warrant Officer | First Warrant Officer | Master Warrant Officer | Senior Warrant Officer | Chief Warrant Officer |
| Abbreviation | 3WO | 2WO | 1WO | MWO | SWO | CWO |

=== Officers ===
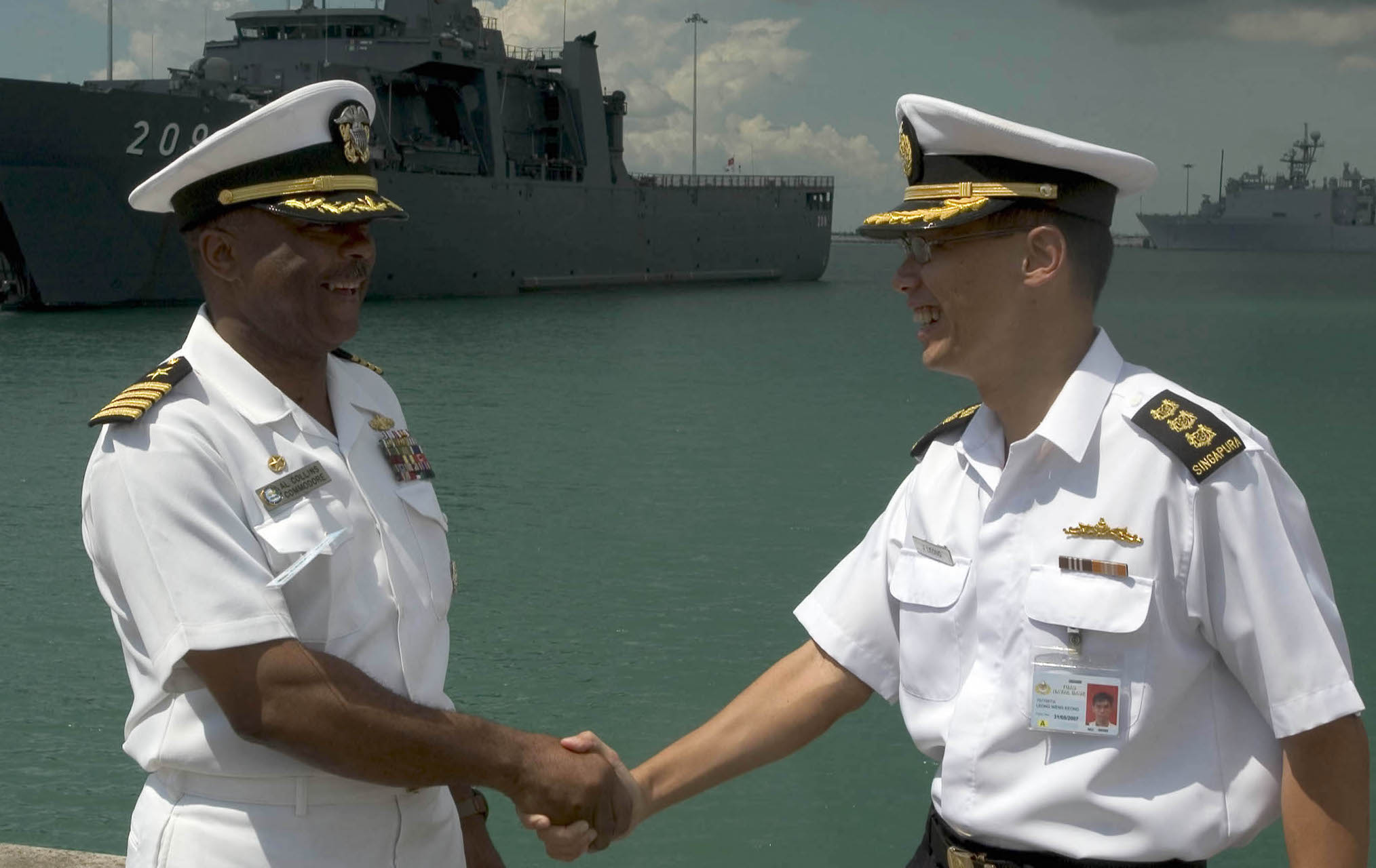
Colonel Joseph Leong, Republic of Singapore Navy (right) shakes hands with Captain Al Collins, United States Navy (left) in Changi Naval Base during exercise Cooperation Afloat Readiness and Training (CARAT) 2006. Both officers are of similar rank but bear different rank titles and insignia.

Officers exercise leadership and command authority in the SAF. Prospective officers are selected from trainees in BMT and SCS, and undergo training at the Officer Cadet School (OCS). While training to become an officer, they hold the rank of officer cadet or midshipman, which are considered equivalent in rank to a private. Officer cadets wear white-barred epaulettes while in training, with the number of bars signifying their overall progress. While on exercise, they may wear special epaulettes which symbolize their role or appointment for that exercise.

Prospective officers are required to hold A-Level, International Baccalaureate, polytechnic diploma or equivalent tertiary qualifications, and career officers are encouraged to pursue higher studies in universities. They are appointed by the President of Singapore.

Junior officers are in charge of sub-units, and begin at the rank of second lieutenant (2LT), and may be promoted to the rank of lieutenant (LTA). Regular and reservist personnel may be further promoted to the rank of captain (CPT) after attending courses at the SAF Advanced Schools. The rank insignia of junior officers are depicted by bars.

Senior officers are typically placed in charge of units or higher branches and are responsible for making command decisions. They begin duties at the rank of major (MAJ), and may progress to lieutenant colonel (LTC), senior lieutenant colonel (SLTC), or colonel (COL). The rank insignia for senior officers uses the coat of arms of Singapore, also informally known as "crabs".

The general officers are the highest-ranking officers in the SAF, and are responsible for broad strategy and policies which affect the entire armed forces. General officers of the Army and Air Force use general-based ranks, while those of the Navy use admiral-based ranks. Their rank insignia consists of stars, ranging from one for brigadier generals (BG) and rear admiral (one-star) (RADM(1)), two for major generals (MG) and rear admiral (two-star) (RADM(2)), and three for lieutenant generals (LG) and vice admirals (VADM).

Although the ranks of general and admiral (four-star equivalent) are provided for in the Singapore Armed Forces (Ranks of Servicemen) Regulations, no officers have been promoted to the rank. The rank and the rank insignia are also not listed on the Ministry of Defence website.

All officers are addressed by lower-ranking personnel as "Sir" for males or "Ma'am" for females.

Officer ranks of the Singapore Armed Forces
| Insignia | | | | | | | | | | | Insignia not known |
| Rank | Second; Lieutenant | Lieutenant | Captain | Major | Lieutenant; Colonel | Senior; Lieutenant; Colonel | Colonel | Brigadier; General Rear Admiral (one-star) | Major; General Rear Admiral (two-star) | Lieutenant; General Vice Admiral | General Admiral |
| Abbreviation | 2LT | LTA | CPT | MAJ | LTC | SLTC | COL | BG RADM(1) | MG RADM(2) | LG VADM | GEN ADM |

Officer cadet ranks
| Insignia | | | |
| Rank | Officer Cadet Midshipman | | |
| Abbreviation | OCT MID | | |
| Term | Common Leadership Term | Service Term Naval Foundation Term | Professional Term Naval Advance Term/Internship Term |

=== Military experts ===
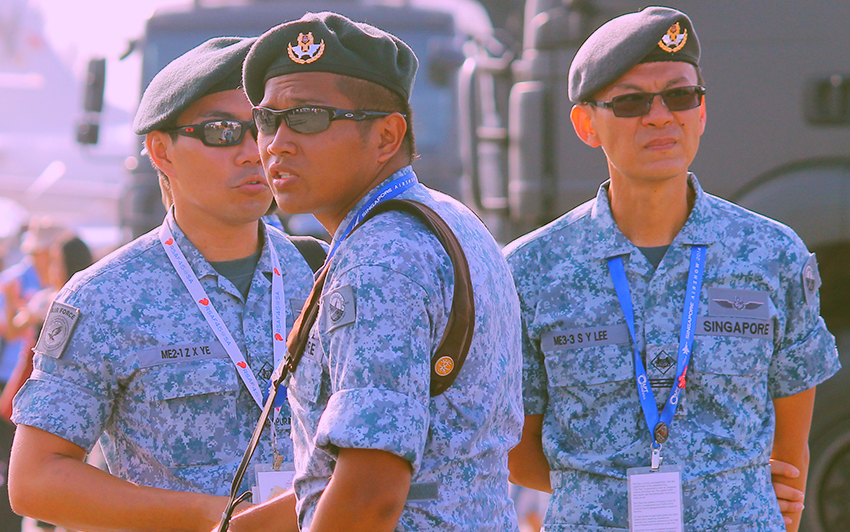
A Military Expert 3 (right) with other soldiers of the Republic of Singapore Air Force at the 2014 Singapore Airshow. A Military Expert 2 (left) is identifiable with an abbreviated rank title on his name tape even though the rank insignia on his chest is obscured.

Military experts are soldiers who serve in specific military domains under the Military Domain Experts Scheme (MDES), which is a separate rank scheme that was introduced in April 2010. The rank structure runs in parallel with the conventional ranks of enlistees, specialists, warrant officers, and commissioned officers, and allows for continual advancement from ME1 to higher ranks all the way to ME9 based upon expertise and performance levels.

The rank titles do not have unique names, but are instead suffixed by a cardinal number from 1 to 9 (for example, Military Expert 3 or ME3), with 1 indicating the most junior rank and 9 the most senior. Each of the ranks are further qualified by another suffix: this may be a number to denote pay grades (for example, Military Expert 4–2 or ME4-2); or a letter to denote military experts in different stages of training, namely T for trainees (for example, Military Expert 4 Trainee or ME4T) or A for apprentices (for example, Military Expert 4 Apprentice or ME4A). Their insignia has the National Arms inside the diamond with a gold border.

Military expert trainees are considered equivalent to the rank of private, while military expert apprentices are considered equivalent to the rank of Military Expert 1. Military experts of ME1 and ME2 rank are considered equivalent to specialists and military experts of ME3 rank are considered equivalent to warrant officers. Those ranking Military Expert 4 (ME4) or higher (collectively referred to as senior military experts) are considered equivalent to commissioned officers and given the same legal authority.

Military experts are the only ranks within the Singapore Armed Forces ranks to have their abbreviated rank and suffix displayed on the name tape.

In comparison to a typical progression of a specialist-warrant officer that does not allow progression to the officer ranks, the linear progression under the MDES may allow a serviceman to be promoted to an officer equivalent rank of ME4 or ME5.

Similar to a warrant officer, military experts under the warrant officers scheme holding ME3 rank are addressed by lower-ranking personnel as "Encik" for males or "Cik" for females; while senior military experts with ME4 rank and above are addressed by lower-ranking personnel as "Sir" for males or "Ma'am" for females, similar to officers.

Military expert ranks of the Singapore Armed Forces
| Image | | | | | | | | | |
| Rank | ME1 | ME2 | ME3 | ME4 | ME5 | ME6 | ME7 | ME8 | ME9 |
| Equivalent rank | 2SG | MSG | 1WO | CPT | MAJ | LTC | COL | BG; RADM(1) | MG; RADM(2) |

Military Expert trainee and apprentice ranks
| Insignia | | | |
| Rank | Military Expert 1 Trainee | Military Expert 4 Trainee | Military Expert 4 Apprentice |
| Abbreviation | ME1(T) | ME4(T) | ME4(A) |

=== SAFVC volunteers ===
The SAF Volunteer Corps (SAFVC) was established in October 2014 to allow female Singapore citizens, first generation permanent residents and naturalised citizens, all of whom would not ordinarily have any national service obligation, to serve as volunteers in the SAF. The SAFVC Volunteers (SV) have a unique rank structure that does not correlate with the other ranks in the SAF.

The SAFVC ranks comprise five tiers from SAFVC Volunteer (Trainee), abbreviated as SV (Trainee), to SAFVC Volunteer 4 (SV4), enumerated by winged chevrons.

Volunteer ranks of the SAF Volunteer Corps
| Insignia | | | | | |
| Rank | SAFVC; Volunteer (Trainee) | SAFVC; Volunteer 1 | SAFVC; Volunteer 2 | SAFVC; Volunteer 3 | SAFVC; Volunteer 4 |
| Abbreviation | SV (Trainee) | SV1 | SV2 | SV3 | SV4 |

== Rank etiquette ==
=== Wearing of rank insignia ===
Where the rank insignia is worn depends on a number of factors, including the uniform type, rank scheme, gender, and service of the serviceman.

When wearing the No. 4 uniform (combat uniform), all servicemen wear their rank insignia on a chest strap. Otherwise, when wearing other uniforms, the rank insignia of enlistees and specialists are generally worn on the sleeves, while that of warrant officers, officers, and military experts are worn on shoulder epaulettes. In addition, female warrant officers, officers, and military experts wear their rank insignia on the collars when wearing the No. 3 or No. 5 uniforms (service dress uniforms), except for those of the Army, who may wear their insignia on the shoulders if they are wearing a suit with their No. 5 uniform.

=== Suffixes to rank titles ===
Military ranks are sometimes suffixed with an abbreviation to denote certain circumstances under which the personnel holds the rank.

- The addendum (NS) is used for reservists, also known as Operationally Ready National Servicemen (NSmen), who are still serving their reservist obligations, e.g. CPL (NS), 3SG (NS), COL (NS).
- The addendum (RET) is used for reservists and regulars who are honorably discharged from service after they reach their statutory age of service, and have fulfilled their reservist obligations, e.g. MAJ (RET), BG (RET), SWO (RET).
- The addendum (VOL) is used for servicemen who have reached their statutory age cap from their reservist obligations but have voluntarily extended their service, e.g. COL (VOL), BG (VOL).

== Historical rank insignia ==
| Insignia | |
| Rank | Military Expert 8 |
| Dates | 2010–2023 |

=== 1983–1989 ===
Officers

| Rank group | General / flag officers | | | Senior officers | | | Junior officers |
|---|---|---|---|---|---|---|---|---|---|
| Singapore Army; Republic of Singapore Air Force (1983–1989) |
| Singapore Army; Republic of Singapore Air Force (1983–1989) | Lieutenant general | Major general | Brigadier | Colonel | Lieutenant colonel | Major | Captain | Lieutenant | Second lieutenant |
| Republic of Singapore Navy (1983–1989) | Vice admiral | Rear admiral | Commodore | Colonel | Lieutenant colonel | Major | Captain | Lieutenant | Second lieutenant |

Army Enlisted

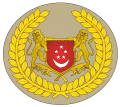
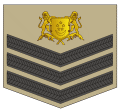
| Rank group | Senior NCOs | | | | | Junior NCOs | | Enlisted |
|---|---|---|---|---|---|---|---|---|
| Singapore Armed Forces (1983–1989) | | | | | | | | No insignia |
| Singapore Armed Forces (1983–1989) | Warrant officer class I | Warrant officer class II | Staff sergeant | Sergeant | Corporal first class | Corporal | Lance corporal | Private |

== See also ==
- Comparative military ranks
