= Senior lieutenant colonel =

Senior lieutenant colonel (SLTC) is a rank in the Singapore Armed Forces, ranking just above lieutenant colonel and below colonel. The senior lieutenant colonel rank designates those who have been tapped for higher appointments in the army, navy and air force. The insignia for the rank of SLTC consists of two Singapore state crests and a pair of laurels.

Officer ranks of the Singapore Armed Forces
Insignia											Insignia not known
Rank	Second; Lieutenant	Lieutenant	Captain	Major	Lieutenant; Colonel	Senior; Lieutenant; Colonel	Colonel	Brigadier; General Rear Admiral (one-star)	Major; General Rear Admiral (two-star)	Lieutenant; General Vice Admiral	General Admiral
Abbreviation	2LT	LTA	CPT	MAJ	LTC	SLTC	COL	BG RADM(1)	MG RADM(2)	LG VADM	GEN ADM

== See also ==
- Singapore Armed Forces ranks
