= Master warrant officer =

Senior military rank

Master warrant officer (MWO) is a senior military rank in the Bangladesh Armed Forces, the Canadian Forces, Singapore Armed Forces, the South African National Defence Force, the Israel Defense Forces and the Nigerian Armed Forces.

== Bangladesh Armed Forces ==
Rank insignia

Master Chief Petty Officer

Master Warrant Officer

Master Warrant Officer

Master warrant officer is the highest junior-commissioned officer rank in Bangladesh Navy above Senior chief petty officer. Master Warrant Officer is a junior-commissioned officer rank in the Bangladesh Army, falling between Senior warrant officer and Honorary Lieutenant. Master Warrant Officer is the highest airman rank in the Bangladesh Air Force above Senior warrant officer.

== Canadian Armed Forces ==
Master warrant officer is an Army and Air Force non-commissioned member rank of the Canadian Forces. It is senior to the rank of warrant officer and its equivalents, and junior to chief warrant officer and its equivalents. Its Naval equivalent is chief petty officer 2nd class.

The French language form is adjudant-maître.

=== Insignia ===
Rank insignia

Royal Canadian Navy

Canadian Army

Royal Canadian Air Force

The rank insignia of the MWO is a crown within a wreath of gold laurel, worn on both forearms of the service dress tunic; in gold metal and green enamel miniature pins on the collar of the service dress shirt and outerwear coats (army only); on CADPAT slipons worn in the middle of the chest, embroidered in high vis thread (army) or dark blue (air force) thread; and in "pearl grey" thread on blue slip-ons on both shoulders of other uniforms (air force only).

=== Forms of address ===
MWOs are generally initially addressed as "Master Warrant Officer", or "Sergeant-Major" (if they hold that appointment), and thereafter as "Sir" or "Ma'am".

=== Appointments ===
MWOs may hold a number of appointments, including the position of sergeant-major, the most senior NCM in a company-sized Army unit or sub-unit. Some of these appointments are listed below:

- Battery sergeant-major (BSM) — the senior NCM of an artillery battery
- Squadron sergeant-major (SSM) — the senior NCM of a cavalry, armoured, combat engineer, or communications squadron
- Company sergeant-major (CSM) — the senior NCO of any other company-sized unit
- Quartermaster sergeant instructor (QMSI) - the senior MWO in a battalion of the Princess Patricia's Canadian Light Infantry
- Drill sergeant-major (DSM) - the senior MWO in an infantry battalion other than those of the Princess Patricia's Canadian Light Infantry
- Regimental quartermaster sergeant (RQMS) - the senior MWO in a battalion sized unit in charge of supply and technical items.
- Equipment Technical Sergeant Major (ETSM) - the senior RCEME MWO of a Division size formation. In the RCAF the ETSM is usually a CWO.
- Equipment Technical quartermaster Sergeant (ETQMS) - the senior RCEME MWO of a Regiment or Battalion.

Due to the unified nature of the CF, it is not unheard-of for Air Force MWOs — especially those of the so-called "purple trades", such as logistics or military police — to find themselves filling the appointment of squadron or company sergeant-major in what are otherwise considered "hard" army units (such as service battalions or communication squadrons).

=== Messes and quarters ===
MWOs generally mess and billet with other warrant officers and with sergeants, and their naval equivalents, chief petty officers and petty officers. Their mess on military bases or installations are generally named the "Warrant Officers and Sergeants Mess".

== Singapore ==
Master warrant officer is a senior warrant officer rank in the Singapore Armed Forces.

Master warrant officers often hold senior leadership roles such as school sergeant majors and regimental sergeant majors of brigade-sized units. The school sergeant major of Officer Cadet School is a master warrant officer. He is in charge of the discipline of more than 800 officer cadets, in addition to the specialists and more junior warrant officers there.

Warrant officer ranks of the Singapore Armed Forces
Insignia						
Rank	Third Warrant Officer	Second Warrant Officer	First Warrant Officer	Master Warrant Officer	Senior Warrant Officer	Chief Warrant Officer
Abbreviation	3WO	2WO	1WO	MWO	SWO	CWO

== South Africa ==
Master Warrant Officer rank insignia in the SANDF

In 2008, the warrant officer ranks of the South African National Defence Force were expanded and the rank of master warrant officer was created.

== See also ==
- Non-commissioned member
- Chief Petty Officer
- Non-commissioned officer
- Warrant officer (United States)
