= Regimental sergeant major =

Military rank or appointment

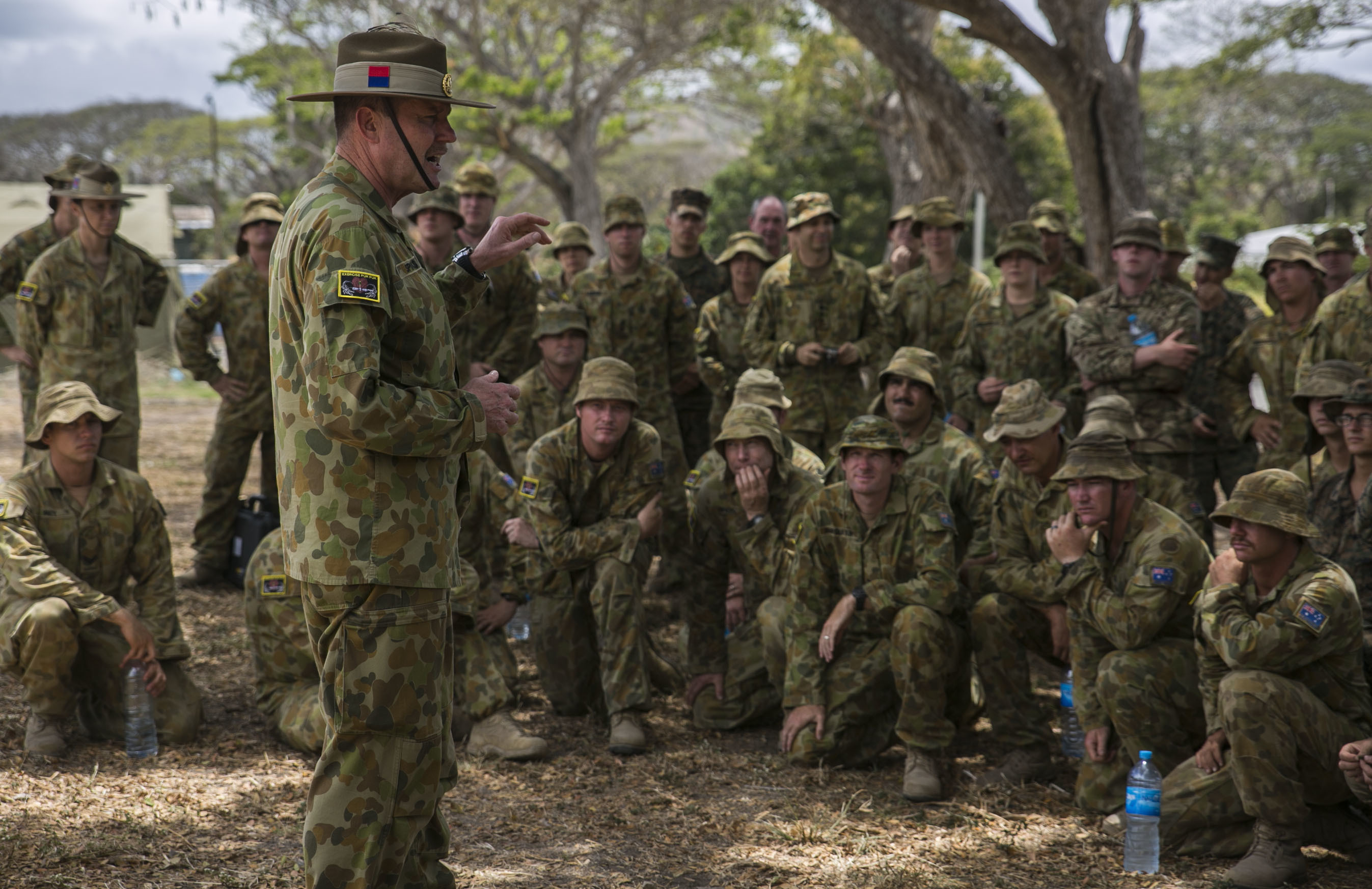
Warrant Officer Don Spinks, the-then Regimental Sergeant Major of the Australian Army, speaking with soldiers in 2015

Regimental sergeant major (RSM) is an appointment that may be held by a warrant officer (WO) in the British Army, the Royal Marines, and the armies of many other Commonwealth and former Commonwealth nations. It is also an actual rank in the Irish Defence Forces, and formerly in the British Army, Royal Marines and United States Army. Only one warrant officer holds the appointment of RSM in any regiment or battalion, making them the senior warrant officer; in a unit with more than one top-ranked WO, the RSM is considered to be first amongst equals". The RSM is primarily responsible for assisting their commander in maintaining standards and discipline amongst the non-commissioned members and acts as a parental figure to their subordinates, sometimes referred to by the mantra "Drill, Dress and Discipline".

== Australia ==
A regimental sergeant major in the Australian Army is usually a warrant officer class 1 and holds a special position within a regiment or battalion as the senior non-commissioned adviser to the unit's commanding officer. They are known as the regimental sergeant major regardless of whether the unit is a regiment or battalion. The RSM has leadership, discipline and welfare responsibilities for up to 650 soldiers, as well as the maintenance of their equipment.

The most senior warrant officer in the Australian Army is titled Regimental Sergeant Major of the Army.

== Canada ==
In the Canadian Forces, the appointment of regimental sergeant major is normally held by an army chief warrant officer. Due to the integrated nature of the Canadian Forces, however, it is not impossible for an air force chief warrant officer or a naval chief petty officer 1st class to rise to that post, especially in units with a high number of support trades personnel; examples might include a Royal Canadian Logistics Service CPO1 being appointed RSM of a service battalion, or an air force Communications and Electronics Branch CWO appointed to the position in a communication regiment.

RSMs are generally addressed as "RSM" or "Mr" or "Ms" by officers, and as "Sir" or "Ma'am" by subordinates (which applies only to regimental sergeant majors who are army or air force CWOs; naval CPO1s are universally addressed as "Chief", regardless of any appointments held).

== Nigeria ==
In the Nigerian Army, the appointment of RSM is usually held by a master warrant officer. The RSM, during any visit from a general officer, marches slowly in front of the military procession with a brightly coloured and decorated wooden stick.

== Singapore ==
Like most Commonwealth forces, the RSM in the Singapore Armed Forces is usually the most senior warrant officer in the unit. Depending on the size of the unit, RSMs can be third, second, first, master, or senior warrant officers.

Exceptions to this are:

- In the presence of another warrant officer; however even under these circumstances, the RSM is treated as the senior warrant officer of the unit while the other warrant officers are recognised as officers.
- In National service (reserve equivalent) battalions which often have national service junior sergeants fast-tracked for promotion holding the RSM appointment.

During exercises and operations, the role of the RSM is to organize the battalion for movement, and to assist the unit S1 (manpower officer) in manpower administration.

In camp, he is the master of drill, parades and ceremonies. He supervises the company sergeant majors and platoon sergeants in the instruction of drill, and is in charge of the organization of formal parades. On the parade square, the RSM, with his pace stick, is "king" as he has authority over all soldiers and even has the power to order punishment for subalterns (junior commissioned officers such as captains and lieutenants). In fact, the RSM may conduct "subalterns' parades" – private sessions for junior officers to perfect their foot and sword drills away from the critical eyes of the other ranks.

Senior officers may address them simply as "RSM", while, as a warrant officer, they are addressed as "Sir" or "Ma'am" by those junior in rank. Traditionally, all warrant officers, with or without an appointment as RSM or CSM, are addressed as "Encik" ("mister" in English) by officers and other ranks although this is an informal right which is not to be assumed. Sometimes, lower ranked NCOs who are not warrant officers but who are holding the appointment of CSM may also be given the honour of being addressed as "Encik." Nevertheless, all specialists and warrant officers holding sergeant-major appointments should be addressed as "sergeant-major".

== United Kingdom ==
Insignia of a British Army WO1 regimental sergeant major

In the British Army and Royal Marines, the RSM, who always holds the rank of warrant officer class 1 (WO1), is addressed as "Sir" or "Ma'am" by his or her subordinates. (Note: In the plural, modern practice by the British Ministry of Defence uses the term 'sergeant majors' rather than 'sergeants major'.) In the Household Cavalry, the appointment is regimental corporal major (RCM). The rank of regimental sergeant major existed in the British Army until 1915, when RSMs (who already held warrant officer status) were regraded as warrant officers class I and RSM became an appointment of that rank.

In the Royal Marines, regimental sergeant major was an actual rank (and equivalent to warrant officer class I in the Army) until the Royal Marines themselves re-adopted the ranks of warrant officer classes I and II (which had been abolished in the Royal Marines in 1920) in 1973 (although the term continued to be used interchangeably for warrant officers class I until at least 1981). The most senior warrant officer in the Royal Marines holds the appointment of Corps Regimental Sergeant Major.

== United States ==
The equivalent rank in the United States Army is command sergeant major. The rank of regimental sergeant major existed in the United States Army during World War I. The rank was phased out in the early 1920s.

The billet, as opposed to rank, of regimental sergeant major exists in the United States Marine Corps, as the senior enlisted adviser to the regimental commander. The billet is held by a sergeant major.

Unlike many countries, sergeants major in the United States are not classified as warrant officers, as warrant officers in the United States hold a different status.
