= Chief warrant officer =

Military rank

Chief warrant officer is a senior warrant officer rank, used in many countries.

== Canadian Armed Forces ==
In the Canadian Armed Forces (CAF), a chief warrant officer or CWO is the most senior non-commissioned member (NCM) rank for army, air force, and special operations personnel. Its equivalent rank for navy personnel is chief petty officer 1st class (CPO1). The French language form of chief warrant officer is adjudant-chef (adjuc).

CWO is senior to the rank of master warrant officer (MWO) and its navy equivalent, chief petty officer 2nd class (CPO2).

=== Insignia ===
The rank insignia of the CWO is a simplified version of the coat of arms of Canada: it lacks the annulus behind the shield bearing the motto of the Order of Canada. It also differs from the usual form of the arms through a lack of compartment and mantling.

The insignia is worn in different places depending on the uniform. On ceremonial tunics and mess jackets, full-colour insignia is worn only on the right forearm.

On service dress jackets, full-colour insignia is worn on both forearms. When service dress is worn without a jacket, the insignia is in gold metal and green enamel miniature pins on the shirt collar (army and special operations) or on pearl-grey embroidered shoulder slip-ons (air force).

On field combat clothing (CADPAT) ranks are worn in the middle of the chest, embroidered in monochrome green (army) or monochrome blue (air force) thread. With other operational uniforms, such as flight suits or naval combat dress, the insignia is worn on slip-ons on both shoulders.

Chief warrant officer (army)

Chief warrant officer (air force)

Chief petty officer 1st class

=== Forms of address ===
CWOs are generally initially addressed as "Chief Warrant Officer", and thereafter as "Sir" or "Ma'am" by subordinates; and as Mr. or Ms. by commissioned officers. If they hold the appointment of regimental sergeant major, they may also be addressed as "RSM" by the commanding officer, other officers, or when referred to in conversation. CWOs are never addressed as "Chief", this being reserved for chief petty officers. Civilians can address them as "Chief Warrant Officer", "CWO", or "Mr/Mrs/Miss/Ms" (followed by surname).

=== Key positions ===
CWO/CPO1 may fulfill roles in a number of key positions. These positions require the incumbent to act in an advisory or liaison role to a non-command position such as assistant judge advocate general liaison chief petty officer, corps sergeant-major, or defence ethics program chief warrant officer, for example.

=== Appointments ===
CWOs may hold a number of appointments, some of which are:

- Regimental sergeant major (RSM) – the most senior NCO in a battalion-sized army unit, including armoured, combat engineer, and signal regiments.
- Squadron warrant officer (SWO) – the most senior NCO in a squadron-sized air force units and army signal units
- School chief warrant officers/chief petty officers (SCWO/SCPO) – the most senior NCO in air force, navy and some army schools of battalion or squadron size.
- Base or wing chief warrant officer/chief petty officer – the most senior NCO on a Canadian Forces base or wing establishment
- Fleet chief petty officer – the most senior NCO in either Fleet Atlantic, Fleet Pacific, or Naval Reserve
- Ship's coxswain – the most senior NCO on a Royal Canadian Navy ship (fulfilled by a chief petty officer 2nd class or petty officer 1st class for smaller vessels)

Due to the unified nature of the Canadian Armed Forces, it is not unheard-of for air force CWOs or even navy CPO1s – especially those of the so-called "purple trades", such as logistics or military police – to find themselves filling the appointment of RSM in what are otherwise considered Canadian Army units (such as service battalions or communication regiments). Conversely, it is not impossible for an army CWO or navy CPO1 to be the squadron CWO of a Royal Canadian Air Force squadron.

=== Senior appointments ===
Senior appointments for chief warrant officers and chief petty officers 1st class entitle the incumbents to wear a modified rank badge or an addition to the rank badge. They are as follows:

==== Formation chief warrant officer ====
The coat of arms over the central insignia of the badge of the Canadian Armed Forces (crossed swords, an anchor and an eagle in flight). This appointment is given to CWO assigned to commanders at the base, brigade, wing, and division levels. Specific examples include base chief warrant officer, brigade sergeants-major, wing chief warrant officers, the division chief warrant officer (DCWO) of 1 Canadian Air Division and the division sergeant-major (Div SM) of 3rd Canadian Division (3 Cdn Div). A formation chief warrant officer would typically be seen with a colonel or brigadier-general, but may occasionally be seen with a lieutenant-colonel or major-general.

Formation chief warrant officer

Formation chief warrant officer

==== Command chief warrant officer/chief petty officer (CCWO/CCPO) ====
The coat of arms with a wreath of laurel wrapped around the base. This appointment is given to CWO/CPO1 assigned to commanders of commands including to the commander Canadian Special Operations Forces Command, commander Canadian Forces Intelligence Command and commander Canadian Joint Operations Command. The command chief warrant officer appointed to the commander Canadian Army is called the Canadian Army sergeant-major, while the command chief warrant officer appointed to commander RCAF is known as Chief Warrant Officer of the Air Force. The command chief warrant officer of the RCN is known as the RCN Command Chief Petty Officer. A command chief warrant officer/chief petty officer would be seen with a major-general/rear-admiral or lieutenant-general/vice-admiral.

Command chief warrant officer

Command chief warrant officer

=== Messes and quarters ===
CWOs generally mess and billet with other warrant officers and with sergeants, and their navy equivalents, chief petty officers and petty officers. Their mess on military bases or installations are generally named the "Warrant Officers and Sergeants Mess".

=== Uniforms ===
Although NCMs, CWOs generally wear the uniform accoutrements of commissioned officers; for example, officer cap badge, waistcoat instead of cummerbund with mess dress, etc.

== South African Armed Forces ==
SANDF Chief Warrant Officer rank insignia

In 2008 the Warrant Officer ranks of the South African National Defence Force were expanded and the rank of Chief Warrant Officer was created. In the South African Navy a Chief Warrant Officer is the senior NCO in Fleet Command. In the South African Army the equivalent is the senior NCO in an Army Formation, such as Armour, Infantry etc.

== United States Armed Forces ==
Chief warrant officer in the United States Armed Forces refers to any warrant officer in pay grades CW2 and above. All warrant officers (WO1 to CWO5) are officers and rate a salute by all enlisted NATO other ranks personnel. The U.S. Army and the U.S. Marine Corps use WO1/WO through CW5/CWO5 as designators and the U.S. Navy uses WO1 for one specialty (cyber warfare); all other branches of the U.S. Armed Forces use CWO2 through CWO5. The U.S. Air Force, although authorized to appoint warrant officers, does not utilize those grades in any capacity. All warrant officers dine in the officers' mess but rate just below O-1 (NATO rank code OF-1).

On 4 June 2018, the Chief of Naval Operations announced the reestablishment of the rank of warrant officer one (pay grade W-1), for cyber warrant officers, and solicited applications for the rank/grade. These warrant officers will receive their appointment via warrant and not via commission. They will incur a six-year service obligation once promoted to W-1. A minimum of three-years in grade with a total service time of 12 years must be achieved before appointment and commission to chief warrant officer (W-2). However, the President also may grant appointments of warrant officers in the grade of W-1 via commission at any time as well as the Secretary of the Navy may also appoint warrant officers in that grade via commission, through additional regulations. In mid-December 2018, the Navy announced that six selectees had been named. They will wear a distinctive cap badge with two crossed anchors.

Warrant officer rank insignia is the only officers' insignia that is not the same for all branches of the U.S. military, with one exception. The rank insignia for a CW5 became the only universal insignia within the warrant officer ranks when the U.S. Navy promoted its first CWO5 in 2002 and the Army adopted the emblem in 2004.

Warrant officers in the United States are classified as officers and are in the "W" category (NATO "WO"); they are technical leaders and specialists. Chief warrant officers are commissioned by the president of the United States and take the same oath as regular commissioned officers do. They may be technical experts with a long service as enlisted personnel or direct entrants, most notably as U.S. Army helicopter pilots.

Current insignia and grades of warrant officers of the U.S. military
Service	CW5 or CWO5	CW4 or CWO4	CW3 or CWO3	CW2 or CWO2	WO1
Army	U.S. Army chief warrant officer 5 rank insignia	U.S. Army chief warrant officer 4 rank insignia	U.S. Army chief warrant officer 3 rank insignia	U.S. Army chief warrant officer 2 rank insignia	U.S. Army warrant officer 1 rank insignia
Air Force	U.S. Air Force chief warrant officer 5 rank insignia	U.S. Air Force chief warrant officer 4 rank insignia	U.S. Air Force chief warrant officer 3 rank insignia	U.S. Air Force chief warrant officer 2 rank insignia	U.S. Air Force warrant officer 1 rank insignia
Marine Corps	USMC chief warrant officer 5 rank insignia	USMC chief warrant officer 4 rank insignia	USMC chief warrant officer 3 rank insignia	USMC chief warrant officer 2 rank insignia	USMC warrant officer 1 rank insignia
Navy	U.S. Navy chief warrant officer 5 collar insignia	U.S. Navy chief warrant officer 4 collar insignia	U.S. Navy chief warrant officer 3 collar insignia	U.S. Navy chief warrant officer 2 collar insignia	U.S. Navy warrant officer 1 collar insignia
Navy	U.S. Navy chief warrant officer 5 shoulder insignia	U.S. Navy chief warrant officer 4 shoulder insignia	U.S. Navy chief warrant officer 3 shoulder insignia	U.S. Navy chief warrant officer 2 shoulder insignia	U.S. Navy warrant officer 1 shoulder insignia
Coast Guard	Established in 1994; not implemented	U.S. Coast Guard chief warrant officer 4 collar insignia	U.S. Coast Guard chief warrant officer 3 collar insignia	U.S. Coast Guard chief warrant officer 2 collar insignia	Discontinued in 1975
Coast Guard	Established in 1994; not implemented	U.S. Coast Guard chief warrant officer 4 shoulder insignia	U.S. Coast Guard chief warrant officer 3 shoulder insignia	U.S. Coast Guard chief warrant officer 2 shoulder insignia	Discontinued in 1975
NATO Codes	W-5	W-4	W-3	W-2	W-1

=== Notable Warrant Officers ===
- Brigadier General Chuck Yeager, USAF was initially a flight officer (also known as "warrant officer (air)", in the USAAF during World War II
- MAJ (was CW3) Frederick Edgar Ferguson, USA (Medal of Honor recipient)
- MAJ (was WO1) Hugh Thompson, Jr., USA (Soldier's Medal recipient)
- CW5 David F. Cooper, USA
- CW5 Eric Slover, USA (Medal of Honor recipient)
- CW4 Michael J. Novosel, USA (Medal of Honor recipient)
- CW4 Oscar G. Johnson, USA
- CW4 Michael Durant, USA
- CW4 Thomas J. Hennen, USA
- CW4 Keith Yoakum, USA
- CW3 Ronald D. Young Jr., USA
- CW2 Jason W. Myers, USA
- CW2 Louis R. Rocco, USA
- WO1 Robert Mason, USA
- CWO2/Chief Carpenter John Arnold Austin, USN
- WO1 John W. Lang, USN
- WO1 Floyd Bennett, USN (Medal of Honor recipient)
- CWO4 Hershel W. Williams, USMC (Medal of Honor recipient)
- CWO4 John W. Frederick, Jr., USMC
- CWO4 Henry Wildfang, USMC (Gray Eagle Award recipient for longest-serving naval aviator; only chief warrant officer in the history of U.S. Naval Aviation so honored)
- CWO5 Ralph E. Rigby, USA, last continuously serving draftee on active duty in the U.S. Army, retiring in 2014

== See also ==
- Chief Petty Officer 1st Class
- Chief web officer
- Commission (document)
- Non-commissioned member
- Regimental Sergeant-Major
- Singapore Armed Forces ranks
- List of comparative military ranks
