= Specialist and Warrant Officer Institute =

Military training centre in Singapore

- Logo of the Specialist and Warrant Officer Institute

Location
- Pasir Laba Camp; Singapore; 1°20′3.86″N 103°40′17.40″E

Information
- Type: Military training centre
- Motto: "With Pride We Lead"
- Established: 1 June 2004
- Authority: Singapore Armed Forces
- Website: safti.mindef.gov.sg/safti-units/swi/

The Specialist and Warrant Officer Institute (SWI, Chinese: 士官与准尉学院, Malay: Institut Pakar Dan Pegawai Waran, Tamil: நிபுணத்துவ, வாரண்ட் அதிகாரி கழகம்) is the military training centre for warrant officers, specialists (non-commissioned officers) and military experts of the Singapore Armed Forces. Located at Pasir Laba Camp in the Western Water Catchment, it is made up of five schools: the SAFWOS Leadership School (SAFWOS), the Specialist and Warrant Officer Advanced School (SWAS), and three Specialist Cadet Schools.

== History ==
The Specialist and Warrant Officer Institute (SWI) was formed on 1 June 2004 through a merger of three schools: the Singapore Armed Forces Warrant Officer School (SAFWOS), the School of Infantry Specialists (SISPEC), and School of Infantry Weapons (SIW). The SWI was officially opened in Pasir Laba Camp on 17 September 2004.

In 2008, the Singapore Armed Forces introduced the rank of Specialist Cadet (SCT) for trainees at SISPEC. One year later, a Combined Arms Term component was added to the Specialist Cadet Course.

In 2010, the SWI was reorganised into five schools: SAFWOS, the Specialist and Warrant Officer Advanced School (SWAS), and three Specialist Cadet Schools (SCS I, SCS II and SCS III). In the same year, the SWAS started conducting the Warfighter Course. On 14 January 2011, SAFWOS started conducting the Joint Leadership Course. In 2013, SWAS introduced the Basic Warfighter - Platoon Sergeant and Warfighter - Company Sergeant Major Courses.

On 25 February 2014, command of the SWI was transferred from the HQ 9th Division to the SAFTI Military Institute.

== Organisation ==
=== SAFWOS Leadership School ===
The SAFWOS Leadership School, previously known as the Singapore Armed Forces Warrant Officer School (SAFWOS), trains warrant officers and military experts in the Singapore Armed Forces. It was established on 15 January 1992 at the former location of the Officer Cadet School in Pasir Laba Camp. At the time, it conducted warrant officer training courses for non-commissioned officers who were going to be promoted to warrant officers. In April 2000, SAFWOS's curricula was expanded to include other courses such as the Army Battalion Regimental Sergeant Major Course, the Advanced Leadership Programme, and the Senior Leadership Programme.

In 2004, SAFWOS merged with SISPEC and the School of Infantry Weapons (SIW) to form the Specialist & Warrant Officer Institute. In 2010, after the SWI was reorganised into five schools, SAFWOS continued providing professional military education and training for warrant officers from the ranks of Third Warrant Officer to Master Warrant Officer.

As of July 2021, SAFWOS conducts the Joint Leadership Course, the Army Battalion Regimental Sergeant Major Course, the Joint Advanced Leadership Course, and the Joint Senior Leadership Course for warrant officers from all three branches of the Singapore Armed Forces. It also conducts the National Service Leadership Course and National Service Battalion Regimental Sergeant Major Course for reservist warrant officers.

=== Specialist and Warrant Officer Advanced School ===
The Specialist and Warrant Officer Advanced School (SWAS), previously known as the Advanced Specialist Training Wing (ASTW) before 2010, conducts advanced training courses for warrant officers, specialists and military experts of all vocations in the Army over two phases: the Common Phase and Operations Phase (mainly for Infantry, Military Police and Guards).

In November 2012, SWAS revamped its curriculum by removing the Warfighter Course and incorporating its elements into the 13-week Basic Warfighter - Platoon Sergeant Course and 9-week Warfighter - Company Sergeant Major Course. In 2013, SWAS also moved out of the Specialist Cadet School III cluster to the former School of Infantry building within Pasir Laba Camp.

=== Specialist Cadet Schools ===
The Specialist Cadet School (SCS) is made up of three schools – SCS I, SCS II, and SCS III – which train specialists, the equivalent of non-commissioned officers (NCOs), in the Singapore Armed Forces. It started as the School of Infantry Section Leaders (SISL), which was established on 1 October 1970. It was renamed SAF Infantry Non-Commissioned Officers' School (SAFINCOS) on 1 May 1982 and again in 1992 to School of Infantry Specialists (SISPEC). It relocated from Pasir Laba Camp to Pulau Tekong in 1999 before moving back to Pasir Laba Camp in 2006. It was renamed Specialist Cadet School in 2010 and its three constituent schools came under the management of the Specialist and Warrant Officer Institute (SWI).
