= Officer Cadet School (Singapore) =

Military training centre for officers in Singapore

- Logo of the Officer Cadet School

Location
- SAFTI Military Institute; Singapore; 1°20′07.32″N 103°40′53.09″E

Information
- Type: Military training centre
- Motto: "To Lead, To Excel, To Overcome"
- Established: 14 February 1966
- Authority: Singapore Armed Forces
- Commander: COL Wong Pui Pin
- Website: official website

The Officer Cadet School (OCS, Chinese: 见习军官学府, Malay: Sekolah Pegawai Kadet, Tamil: பயிற்சி அதிகாரிப் பள்ளி) is a military training centre that trains commissioned officers for the four branches of the Singapore Armed Forces (SAF): the Army, the Navy, the Air Force, and the Digital and Intelligence Service.

Located within the SAFTI Military Institute complex in Jurong West, it has twelve wings inclusive of tri-service wings. Nine wings are named according to the NATO phonetic alphabet from A (Alpha) to E (Echo) and S (Sierra) and T (Tango), while the remaining three wings (Mids, Air and Dis) are for the Navy, Air Force, and Digital and Intelligence Service, respectively.

The trainees are mostly drawn from the best performing recruits in each basic military training cohort. Trainees with outstanding performance from the Specialist Cadet School (SCS), where specialists (non-commissioned officers) are trained, are also invited to transfer to OCS. Career soldiers may also attend OCS on application, recommendation and selection. OCS trainees are known as Officer Cadets (OCTs) if they serve in the Army and Air Force, Midshipmen (MIDs) if they serve in the Navy, and Senior Military Expert Trainees (ME4Ts) if they serve in the Digital and Intelligence Service.

== History ==
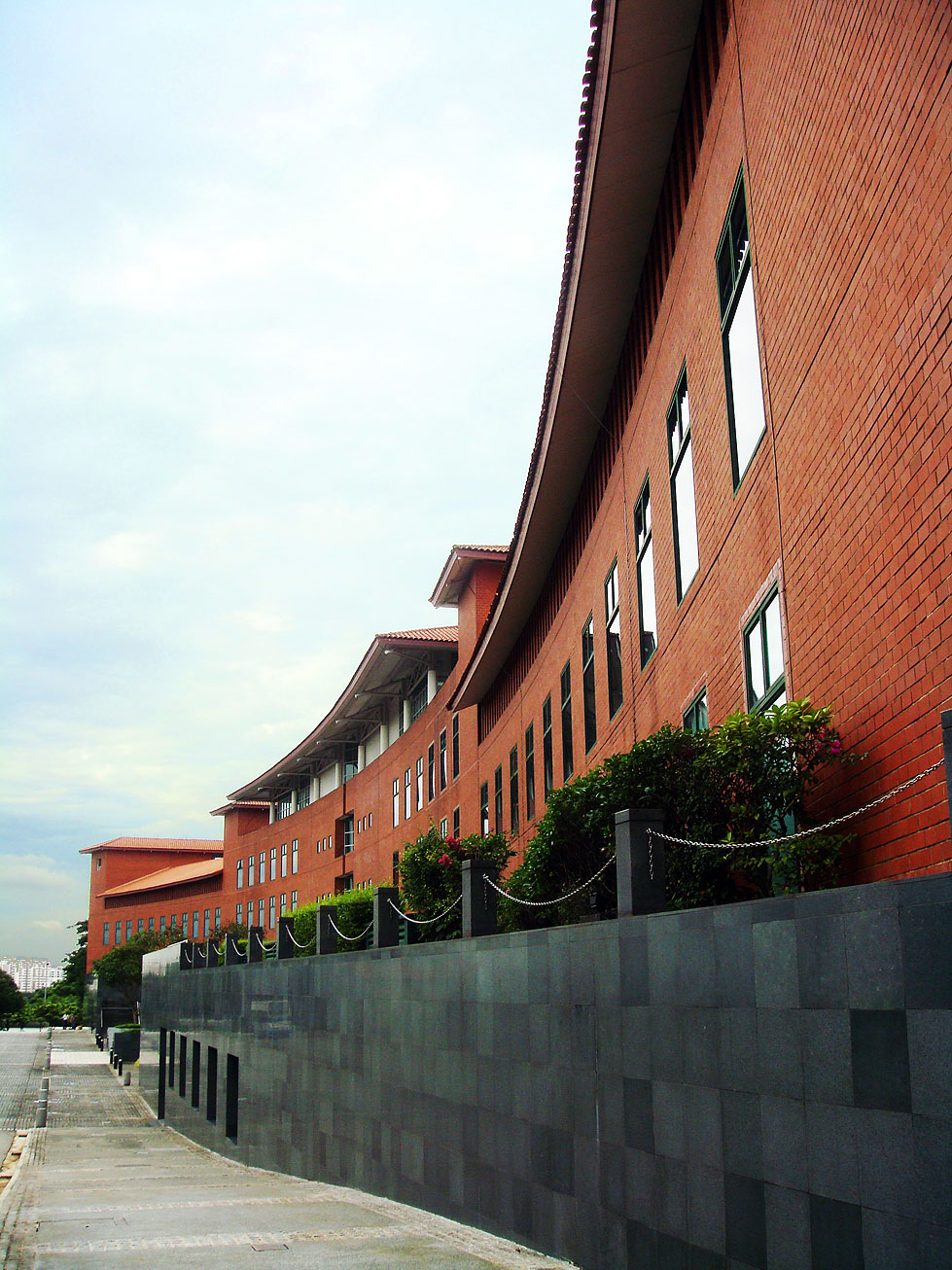
The OCS building as seen from the northwest

The Officer Cadet School traces its origins to the Singapore Armed Forces Training Institute (SAFTI), which was established in Pasir Laba Camp on 14 February 1966 as a military institute to train officers and non-commissioned officers for the Singapore Armed Forces. Before then officer training had been held overseas at British and Commonwealth academies. While SAFTI was under construction at Pasir Laba Camp, 60 officers and non-commissioned officers were selected to attend a three-month instructors' preparatory course at Jurong Primary School conducted by a group of foreign advisers. In May 1966, the Ministry of Interior and Defence started recruiting trainees for SAFTI through a selection process that included written and IQ tests, physical fitness tests and interviews. Out of 2,500 applicants, 300 were chosen to undergo officer training. SAFTI was officially opened on 18 June 1966 by Minister for Defence Goh Keng Swee, and the 300 cadets were to form the first cadre of cadets of the SAFTI's officer wing - then the School of Infantry Officers SAFTI (SIO-SAFTI).

The SIO held its first public parade on National Day 1966 as part of the overall SAFTI battalion that took part that day.

On 16 July 1967, only 117 of the 300 cadets successfully completed their training and received their commissions at the SAFTI parade square. SAFTI received its colours from Prime Minister Lee Kuan Yew in a ceremony on 16 June 1968. As more companies were set up to train cadets and the Corps of Cadets grew into a full battalion and later on a regiment, the School of Infantry Officers was renamed Officer Cadet School (OCS) and its headquarters was set up on 1 June 1969.

In 1969, six women from the People's Defence Force were offered positions for officer training at SAFTI owing to their outstanding performance. On 10 July 1970, the six women received their commissions along with the fourth batch of infantry officer cadets, becoming the first female officers of the SAF. The first batch of cadets who attended the Officer Cadet Course was commissioned on 11 November 1972.

In 1972, a "scholars platoon" was introduced in OCS to encourage cadets with better qualifications to take up government-sponsored scholarships for further training. In the 1970s, after the National Service duration was shortened from three years to two years and six months, OCS introduced a nine-month Standard Military Course on 26 December 1974 to improve officer training and provide officers with a longer service period after commissioning. Officer cadets were selected primarily on the basis of their academic qualifications and extra-curricular activities before they enlisted for National Service. In 1977, OCS introduced an overseas training component in the Standard Military Course.

On 1 June 1980, OCS became OCS-SAFTI and a nine-month Infantry Officer Cadet Course was introduced on 1 September 1980. Under the new system, officer cadets were selected only after they had completed their basic military training. The nine-month course consisted of a 12-week junior term that trains cadets to lead sections, as well as a 27-week senior term that trains them to lead platoons. In May 1980, the Medical Officer Cadet Course was introduced for officers who wanted to take up medical or dental professions in the Singapore Armed Forces.

The SAFTI Military Institute was opened was 9 June 1990 and a new 42-week Tri-Service Officer Cadet Course was launched on 17 September 1990 by Lieutenant-General Winston Choo, the Chief of Defence Force. In the first 19 weeks of the course, cadets from all three branches of the Singapore Armed Forces trained in the same environment. After that, the cadets from the Navy, Air Force and the Army's support arms attended vocational training in their respective schools, while Infantry cadets remained in OCS to continue their professional training. In the last two weeks, all the cadets returned to OCS to rehearse for their commissioning parade.

In 2004, after National Service was further reduced from two years and six months to two years, the Officer Cadet Course was shortened from 42 weeks to 38 weeks. The new 38-week course had its first batch of cadets on 21 March 2005.

== Training ==
The current Officer Cadet Course is 38 weeks long and divided into three terms: Service, Professional, and Joint. During the first two weeks of the Service term, cadets take the SAF Leadership Term (SLT) and undergo an initiation ceremony at the end of the two weeks to mark their entry to OCS. After that, they branch into their respective services for the Service Term. From weeks 3 to 14, Army cadets undergo platoon and section-level infantry training. At the end of the Service term, Army cadets will be attached to the various formations (e.g. Armour, Artillery, Combat Engineers, Infantry, Signals), Army Intelligence based on their preferences, performance during the Service Term, security clearance, among other criteria.

During the Professional Term from weeks 15 to 35, Army cadets in Infantry remain in the SAFTI Military Institute for further training, while the rest go to various military schools (e.g. Artillery Institute, School of Armour, Signal Institute) to receive training specific to their formations. Cadets in the combat service support formations will attend the Support Officer Cadet Jungle Orientation Training course in Brunei before they report to their respective military schools. Cadets in Infantry will go on two overseas training courses during the Professional Term: the first is to either Taiwan or Thailand for general infantry training, and the second is to Brunei for the Jungle Confidence Course.

Navy and Air Force cadets continue their training at the SAFTI Military Institute before they leave for further training at sea and Air Force Training Command respectively for the last six months of the Professional Term.

All cadets attend the Joint Term at the SAFTI Military Institute in the last three weeks, during which they learn how the three service branches work with each other and rehearse for their Commissioning Parade. At the Commissioning Parade, the cadets receive their commissions with the rank of Second Lieutenant from either the President of Singapore or a representative of the President, such as a Cabinet Minister or Minister of State.

== Rank insignia ==
Like commissioned officers and warrant officers, the cadets wear their rank insignia on chest straps on combat uniforms and shoulder straps on full dress uniforms. The insignia consists of one, two or three white bars denoting their seniority: Freshmen, Junior Bar, and Senior Bar cadets respectively. Senior cadets also have the privilege of taking on school-level appointments in deference to their seniority and course performance during their service term. The graduating class wears peaked caps instead of berets.

All cadets take on exercise and admin appointments to hone their leadership skills. Cadets who take on exercise appointments serve as appointment holders (e.g. platoon commander, platoon sergeant) during field exercises and wear orange-coloured rank insignia similar to that worn by their non-trainee counterparts. For example, the exercise platoon commander wears an orange rank insignia of a Lieutenant while the exercise platoon sergeant wears an orange rank insignia of a First Sergeant. Cadets who take on admin appointments wear the white bar rank insignia with additional loops and whorls to denote their appointments, such as Cadet Platoon Commander and Cadet Platoon Sergeant. The cadets are evaluated on their performance while they are holding these exercise and admin appointments. Each wing's Wing Sergeant Major conducts a change-of-command parade whenever there is a change in appointment holder.

== Organization of the Corps of Cadets ==
Overall command of the Corps of Cadets OCS-SAFTI MI falls on the shoulders of the Commander OCS, who also serves as commandant of the Corps.

Majority of the Corps is made up of direct entry officer cadets straight out of basic military training at the BMT Centre, with graduates of the Specialist Cadet School and career soldiers and specialists forming the rest. Those who did not have collegiate degrees graduate from OCS as Second Lieutenants following their term, those that have graduated from college are given a lieutenant's commission. Technical service and DIS officers are commissioned Military Expert 4 after their graduation, regardless of educational background.

The Corps of Cadets OCS is structured into nine wings: 6 for the Army, and 1 each for the Air Force, Navy, and DIS. Each wing is commanded by a lieutenant colonel:

- Alpha Wing
- Charlie Wing
- Delta Wing
- Echo Wing
- Sierra Wing
- Tango Wing
- MIDS Wing
- Air Wing
- DIS Wing
