= Singapore Armed Forces Training Institute =

Singapore Armed Forces Training Institute or SAFTI was where officers of the Singapore Armed Forces were trained in the past. SAFTI per se does not exist anymore. In current use, it may refer to one of two things:

- SAFTI Military Institute, the successor institute ("SAFTI" being used as a proper name in this case)
- Pasir Laba Camp and training areas of the Singapore Armed Forces
