= Company sergeant major =

Commonwealth military rank

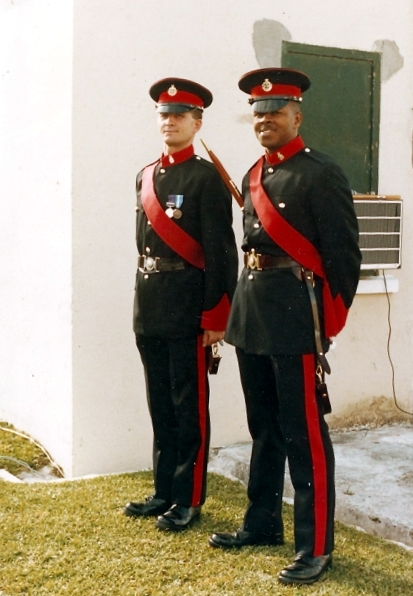
Two Royal Bermuda Regiment warrant officers, class two. A Territorial Army company has two WO2s. On the left is a permanent staff instructor. On the right with a pace-stick, is a company sergeant major.

The company sergeant major (CSM) is the senior non-commissioned soldier of a company in the armies of many Commonwealth countries, responsible for administration, standards and discipline. In combat, their prime responsibility is the supply of ammunition to the company. They also oversee the distribution of other supplies, such as water or food, although that responsibility is mainly that of the company quartermaster sergeant (CQMS), and evacuating the wounded and collecting prisoners of war.

For military units of the same level as a company, the equivalent may be squadron sergeant major (SSM) or battery sergeant major (BSM). In the Household Cavalry, squadron corporal major (SCM) is the equivalent. First sergeant and Kompaniefeldwebel (formerly Hauptfeldwebel in the Wehrmacht and Nationale Volksarmee) are the United States Army and German Heer equivalents respectively.

== Australia ==
In the Australian Army, the CSM appointment is the senior warrant officer of a sub-unit (company, squadron or battery) and is normally held by a warrant officer class 2. The CSM is a senior management role focusing on the training, welfare and discipline of a sub-unit of up to 200 soldiers. They also act as senior adviser to the sub-unit commander. The appointment is known as the Company Sergeant-Major (CSM) in all sub-units except for the following:

- Squadron Sergeant-Major (SSM) in Armoured, Aviation, Engineer and Signal sub-units
- Artificer Sergeant-Major (ASM) in RAEME sub-units
- Battery Sergeant-Major (BSM) in Artillery sub-units

== Canada ==
In the Canadian Forces, the CSM appointment is normally held by a master warrant officer. The appointment is sometimes held by a warrant officer, responsible for a smaller number of personnel.

In the Canadian Forces, the SSM/BSM/CSM is referred to as "Sir/Ma'am" by subordinates, or as "Sergeant Major". Superiors refer to him/her generally as "Sergeant Major" or "CSM". If the position is held by a warrant officer, subordinates will usually still address the individual as "Sergeant Major".

== Singapore ==
In the Singapore Armed Forces, the CSM appointment is usually held by a staff sergeant, master sergeant (the usual rank for a CSM of a non-HQ company) or second warrant officer (the usual rank for a CSM of a battalion or brigade HQ company). He may be addressed as "CSM" by superiors, and as "Sergeant Major" (for a staff sergeant or master sergeant) or "encik" (for a second warrant officer) by subordinates. The CSM is often respectfully addressed by all as "Encik", Malay for "Mister", but the permission for junior enlisted men to do so should not be taken for granted.

Training schools sometimes refer to companies as "wings"; instead of a CSM, the wing has a wing sergeant major. In the case of the Officer Cadet School, WSMs are second or first warrant officers, likely due to the greater experience required for the appointment.

The CSM is the senior specialist in the company. He is in charge of the welfare and discipline of the specialists and enlisted men within, and usually has the company commander's ear. Drill and ceremonies is the CSM's responsibility. He supervises the instruction of drill by the platoon sergeants, and will conduct company rehearsals for parades prior to actual parade rehearsals. On the parade square, the CSM carries a black pace stick.

As an experienced senior specialist, the CSM is expected to be an expert in the weapons and equipment employed by the company, and will assist in instruction where necessary. During exercises or operations, the CSM, aided by the company quartermaster sergeant and company medic, is in charge of organizing the company's logistics, manpower, and medical treatment and evacuation. If necessary, he can be tasked to lead a detachment composed of recoilless rifles and machine guns (known in Singapore military doctrine as a "company block force"), to protect the rifle company from flanking attacks by enemy light armoured vehicles along a contested axis.

== United Kingdom ==
Insignia of a British Army WO2 company sergeant major

In the United Kingdom, CSM is an appointment held by warrant officers class 2 in the British Army and Royal Marines (and previously by quartermaster sergeants in the Royal Marines). The same appointment is referred to in the Cavalry as Squadron Sergeant Major (SSM) and in the Royal Regiment of Artillery as a Battery Sergeant Major (BSM).

By 1913, after the reorganisation of eight companies in a battalion to four companies, there were two colour sergeants in each infantry company. On 1 October 1913, they received the two new appointments of company sergeant major and company quartermaster sergeant, with one of each in each company. The appointment of company sergeant major wore the colour sergeant's old rank badge of a crown over three chevrons until it became an appointment of the new rank of warrant officer class II in 1915 and adopted the rank badge of a large crown on the lower sleeve.

A CSM, BSM or SSM is generally addressed as "Sir" or "Ma'am" by subordinates, or "Sergeant Major". However, a cavalry SSM is often addressed as "Mr (surname)" by officers, and as "Mr (surname), Sir" by his subordinates, with the salutation "Sergeant Major" being reserved for staff sergeants. Typically for the British Army, protocol can vary widely between units, creating a minefield for outsiders, new recruits, and soldiers serving outside their parent regiments.

The most famous fictional examples are perhaps Battery Sergeant Major Tudor Bryn 'Shut Up' Williams, portrayed by Windsor Davies in the 1970s' sitcom It Ain't Half Hot Mum; and Company Sergeant Major Percival Bullimore and Company Sergeant Major Claude Snudge, played by William Hartnell and Bill Fraser, respectively, in the 1958–63 Granada television comedy series The Army Game.
