= SAF Medical Training Institute =

- Active: 1966; 60 years ago
- Country: Singapore
- Branch: Singapore Armed Forces
- Type: Military medicine institute
- Part of: Army Medical Service
- Garrison/HQ: Nee Soon Camp
- Motto: So They May Live

Commanders
- Commander: SLTC(DR) Benjamin Tung

The SAF Medical Training Institute (SMTI) is a military medicine training institute under the Army Medical Service within the SAF Medical Corps. As part of the medical corps, the institute oversees the medical vocational training for SAF service members under the Army, Navy, Air Force, as well as the Singapore Civil Defence Force.

== History ==
SMTI has been the home of the Singapore Armed Forces (SAF) medic since its early days as the Medical Orderlies Training School (1966–1968) and the School of Military Medicine (1968–2006).

SMTI's primary role is to provide training for medical vocationalists to meet the operational and peacetime requirements of the SAF, producing medical personnel (e.g. Medical Officers, Dental Officers, Nursing Officers and Medics) to attend to all the healthcare needs of SAF servicemembers.

On 7 March 1998, the Singaporean military institute's Paramedic Training Programme was awarded accreditation by the Paramedic Academy of the Justice Institute of British Columbia (JIBC).

SMTI's Paramedic Training Programme, a collaborative project between the SAF and SCDF, was officially launched by Mr Matthias Yao (Senior Parliamentary Secretary for Defence and National Development) and Assoc Prof Ho Peng Kee (Senior Parliamentary Secretary for Law and Home Affairs) on 15 July 1996.

== Training structure ==
The institute prides itself in equipping servicemembers fresh from Basic Military Training Centre (BMTC) and Specialist Cadet School (SCS) with the knowledge and skills to operate as Combat Medics and Combat Medic Specialists. Trainees undergo a 12-week Emergency Medical Technician (EMT) programme which comprises theory and practical lessons on topics ranging from patient assessment to multiple casualty management in the military context, as well as the operating of medical equipment (e.g. oxygen resuscitator, automated external defibrillator). Intravenous (IV) cannulation is a key competency and all trainees are required to perform a total of 8 successful live IV cannulations to graduate. Upon graduation, it is mandatory for Combat Medics and Combat Medic Specialists to pass the Annual Medic Proficiency Test (AMPT) during active service and the annual Medical Vocational Training (MVT) during Operationally-Ready National Serviceman (NSman) service. The institute is also home to a specialized Cardiopulmonary Resuscitation training center, accredited by the Singapore Resuscitation and First Aid Council.

== Medical Response Force ==
SMTI also houses the Medical Response Force (MRF), which is the medical arm of the SAF's Chemical, Biological, Radiological and Explosive Defence Group (CBRE Defence Group). Selected Combat Medics and Combat Medic Specialists go through a conversion course to be specially trained by the MRF to provide on-site management to casualties of chemical incidents.

In addition to its military training function, SMTI also contributes significantly to the medical arena in Singapore through its non-military courses. SMTI imparts precious lifesaving skills to civilians ranging from Singapore Civil Defence Force (SCDF) paramedics to doctors involved in Advanced Trauma Life Support (ATLS).
