= BMTC =

BMTC may refer to:

- Bengaluru Metropolitan Transport Corporation in Bengaluru, India
- Basic Military Training Centre in Singapore
