= Lee Yi-Jin =

Singaporean military officer

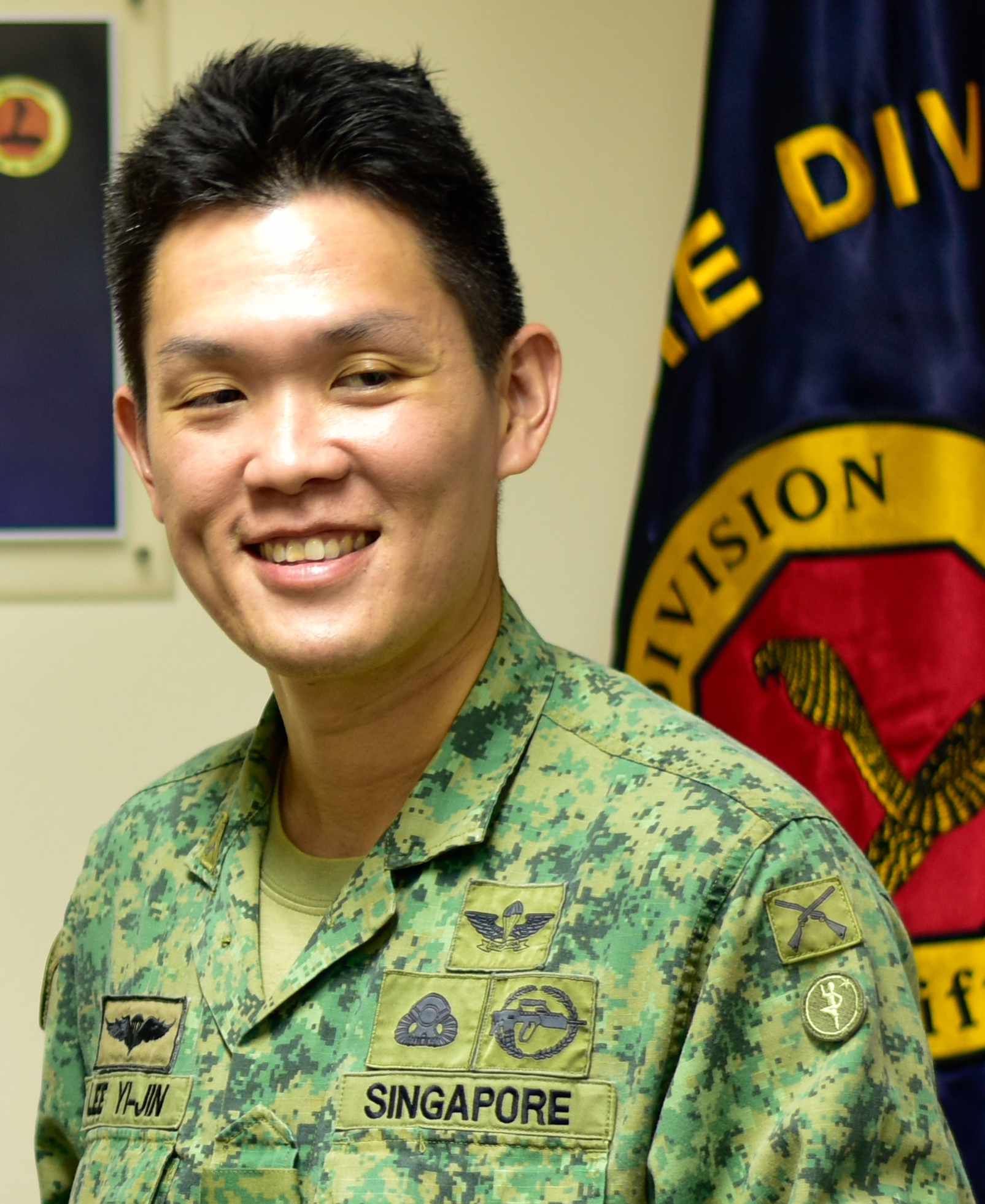
- Lee in 2019

Personal details
- Born: 1979 or 1980 (age 45–46)

Military service
- Allegiance: Singapore
- Branch/service: Digital and Intelligence Service
- Rank: Major-General
- Commands: Commanding Officer, 21st Battalion Singapore Artillery; Commander, 3rd Singapore Infantry Brigade; Assistant Chief of the General Staff for Plans; Commander, 6th Division; Chief, C4I

Lee Yi-Jin (Chinese: 李毅骏) is a Singaporean military officer. He currently serves as Chief of Digital and Intelligence Service (DIS) / Director Military Intelligence, the fourth Service of the Singapore Armed Forces (SAF). He also served as a board member of the Housing and Development Board from 2020 to 2022.

== Education ==
Lee was educated in Raffles Junior College. He received the Singapore Armed Forces Overseas Scholarship in 1999 to study at the University of Chicago, where he graduated with a Bachelor of Arts in Economics. He also completed a Master of Arts at Stanford University in 2003.

Lee attended the U.S. Army Command and General Staff College, where he graduated with a Master of Military Art and Science (Strategy) in 2010 and was awarded the General Dwight D. Eisenhower Award, the Birrer-Brooks Award for Outstanding Master of Military Arts and Science thesis and the Brigadier General Benjamin H. Grierson Award for Excellence in Strategic Studies.

== Military career ==
Lee enlisted in the Singapore Armed Forces (SAF) in 1999, serving in the Artillery. He later served as the Commanding Officer 21st Battalion, Singapore Artillery, Commander 3rd Singapore Infantry Brigade, and Commander of the 6th Singapore Division/ Headquarters Sense and Strike. As Commander 6th Division, Lee served as the Commander of the Health Surveillance Task Force, the SAF's support for the Ministry of Health (MOH) in contract-tracing.

Lee also held various staff appointments within the Ministry of Defence (MINDEF) and the SAF, including Assistant Chief of the General Staff (Plans) in the Army, and Group Chief, Policy and Strategy/ MINDEF Transformation at MINDEF.

Lee later served as Director Military Intelligence (DMI)/ Chief of Command, Control, Communications, Computers and Intelligence (C4I), where he oversaw the establishment of the Digital and Intelligence Service. The DIS was formally inaugurated on 28 October 2022 at the SAFTI Military Institute, with Lee being appointed as Chief of Digital and Intelligence Service.

== Awards and decorations ==
- Public Administration Medal (Gold) (COVID-19)
- Public Administration Medal (Gold) (Military) in 2024
- Public Administration Medal (Bronze) (Military) in 2016
- Long Service Medal (Military)
- Public Service Medal (COVID-19)
- Singapore Armed Forces Long Service and Good Conduct (20 Years) Medal
- Singapore Armed Forces Long Service and Good Conduct (10 Years) Medal with 15 year clasp
- Singapore Armed Forces Good Service Medal
- Gold Cross of Honour of the Bundeswehr in 2026
- Basic Parachutist Badge
- Basic Diving Badge
- Combat Skills Badge
- Thailand Airborne Badge
- Indonesia Airborne Badge
