= SMTI =

SMTI may refer to:

- SAF Medical Training Institute
- Shin Megami Tensei
- Stationary-moving target indication
- Stable marriage problem with ties and indifference
