= SAF Military Police Command =

Military police of Singapore

- Logo of the SAF Military Police Command

- Flag and Regimental Colour of the SAF Military Police
- Motto: Pride, Discipline, Honour

Agency overview
- Formed: 26 August 1966

Jurisdictional structure
- Operations jurisdiction: Singapore
- General nature: Military provost
- Specialist jurisdiction: Protection of international or domestic VIPs, protection of significant state assets

Operational structure
- Headquarters: Mowbray Camp
- Agency executive: COL Low Puay Kng, Commander, SAF Military Police Command

Website
- https://www.army.gov.sg/our-forces/formations/saf-military-police-command/
- colors: Dark Blue

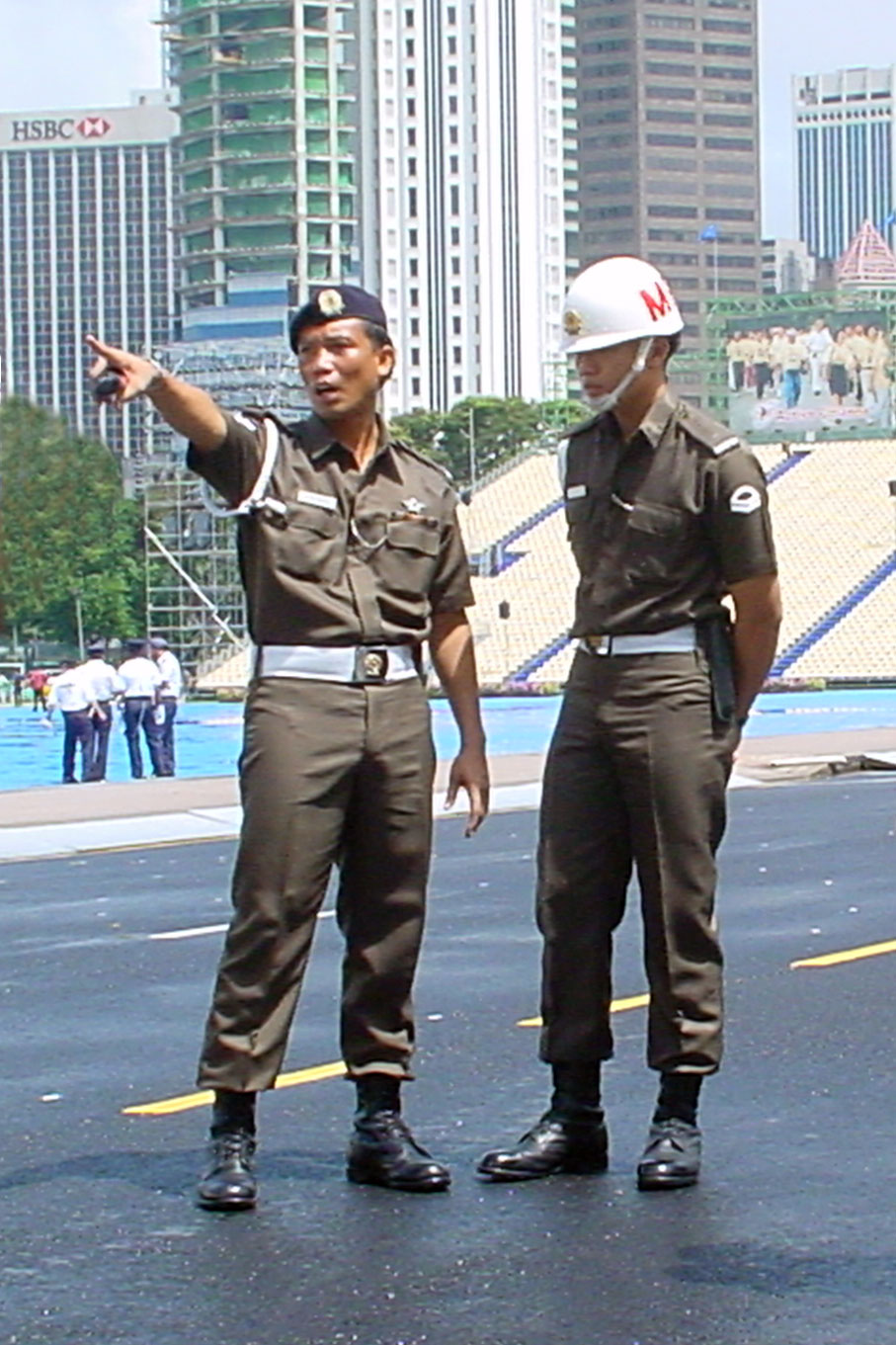
Military Police providing security coverage at the Padang during the National Day Parade in 2000

The SAF Military Police Command (Chinese: 新加坡武装部队宪兵指挥部, Malay: Markas Polis Tentera Angkatan Bersenjata Singapura, Tamil: சிங்கப்பூர் ஆயுதப்பமட ராணுவ மபாலிஸ) is the military police formation of the Singapore Armed Forces (SAF). Established as the Singapore Armed Forces Provost Unit (SAFPU) in 1966, its primary role is to police duties to uphold standards of discipline within the SAF, and to provide security coverage for key SAF military installations and the Ministry of Defence (MINDEF) headquarters at Bukit Gombak.

The Military Police Command also perform guard mounting at the Istana, and form the ceremonial guard of honour for state visits by foreign dignitaries and at other national events. Moreover, they maintain discipline within the SAF through enforcement and the operation of the SAF Detention Barracks, and search and rescue operations, amongst other duties. In wartime contingencies, the Military Police Command would be tasked with safeguarding prisoners-of-war, protecting rear echelon areas and headquarters, as well as securing important supply routes and relevant bases for Singapore.

== History ==
The SAF Military Police Command started on 26 August 1966 as a single company known as the Provost Company, which formally started operations at Beach Road Camp, where the first detention cells were located. At the time, the Provost Company was part of the Manpower Division (later known as JMPD - Joint Manpower Division) and under the command of the 1st Singapore Infantry Brigade. When National Service started in 1967, the Provost Company grew in size and moved to Hill Street Camp in 1970. Two other companies, the Dog and Operations companies, were established at Hill Street Camp.

The Provost, Dog and Operations companies merged in February 1971 to form the SAF Provost Unit (SAFPU) and moved to Mowbray Camp at Ulu Pandan Road in July that year. Two sub-units, the Security Company and the Special Investigations Branch (SIB), were added to the SAFPU in 1973. The following year, a sixth sub-unit, the 1st Reservist Provost Company, was formed in the SAFPU. Up to the late 1980s, the SAFPU operated four different detention barracks located at Tanglin (opened in 1972), Changi (opened in 1973), Nee Soon (opened in 1974) and Kranji (opened in 1977).

The Operations Company took on ceremonial functions in 1980 and formed the first guard of honour for the then German Ambassador to Singapore, taking over from the Singapore Guards full time.

The unique SAFPU brown-khaki hued uniform was first introduced in 1983; complete with its signature white helmet and red insignia, and adorned with its woven white lanyard and metal whistle. The following year, a 93-men unit drawn from the SAFPU formed the Silent Precision Drill Squad (SPDS), who trained under the guidance of foreign instructors for a performance during the 1984 National Day Parade at the Padang. The SPDS performed again during the 1985-86 and 1988 National Day Parades. They also served as the guard-of-honour during the opening ceremony of the 1993 Southeast Asian Games.

Starting in the mid-1980s, the SAFPU have been performing ceremonial sentry duties at the Istana, the official residence of the President of Singapore, including duties at the monthly guard mounting ceremony outside the Istana. In 1995, then President Ong Teng Cheong presented the SAFPU with its colours. The ceremonial company as it was then known also became known as the "Active Provost Company" from 1995 through the early 2000s- assuming all ceremonial duties under the Ministry of Defence (MINDEF) - consolidating and comprising both the Istana Ceremonial team, as well as the SPDS teams into a single Company- which also added Military Police Traffic duties as well.

Other sub-units were also renamed: the Security Company was also renamed the Security Branch (SB) in this period, while the Enforcement and Riot Control Company was known for a time as the "Zone Provost Company" (ZPC); which also housed the Military Police Station. The Dog training team also became known as the "Dog Training Wing", while the training school for all Military Police personnel was known as the SOP (School of Provost)- a school used to training both Military Policemen (and subsequently Policewomen), as well as Specialists [MP Specs - who had formerly completed the first part of their training at SISPEC (as it was formerly known as)].

In 2002, the SAFPU moved from their Ulu Pandan home to a new camp along Choa Chu Kang Way in the Kranji-Yew Tee area; where it remains to date. The old Mowbray Camp at Ulu Pandan has since been handed over to the Singapore Police Force and is currently used by the Protective Security Command (ProCom).

Keeping with SAF tradition, the road leading to the new Choa Chu Kang-Kranji camp, was also named Mowbray Road in specific reference to the old camp; and the new camp itself retained its former name; allowing it to keep being known as Mowbray Camp.

By providence and planning, the SAF Detention Barracks (SAFDB) had already been opened on 29 March 1987 right next to the location (at Lorong Kebasi) of the new Mowbray Camp, where the plan had always been to replace all the different detention barracks previously operated by the SAFPU. This effectively meant that by 2002, all SAFPU related sub-units including the SAFDB, were located in the same vicinity for the first time and for consolidation purposes.

On 1 September 2006, the SAFPU was formally renamed "SAF Military Police Command" and officially inaugurated by Lieutenant-General Ng Yat Chung, then Chief of Defence Force at the time. The SAF Military Police Command came under the command of HQ 2nd People's Defence Force and expanded to include the SAF Band, Ministry of Defence (MINDEF) headquarters, and the 8th and 9th Battalions, Singapore Infantry Regiment in 2011.

== Organisation ==
The SAF Military Police Command is headed by the Command Headquarters at Mowbray Camp. Its operational duties are subdivided into five categories – enforcement, ceremonial, security, incarceration, and criminal investigation – carried out by the Military Police Enforcement Unit (MPEU), Security Troopers from 8 SIR and 9 SIR, the SAF Detention Barracks, and the Special Investigation Branch (SIB).

=== Military Police Enforcement Unit (MPEU) ===
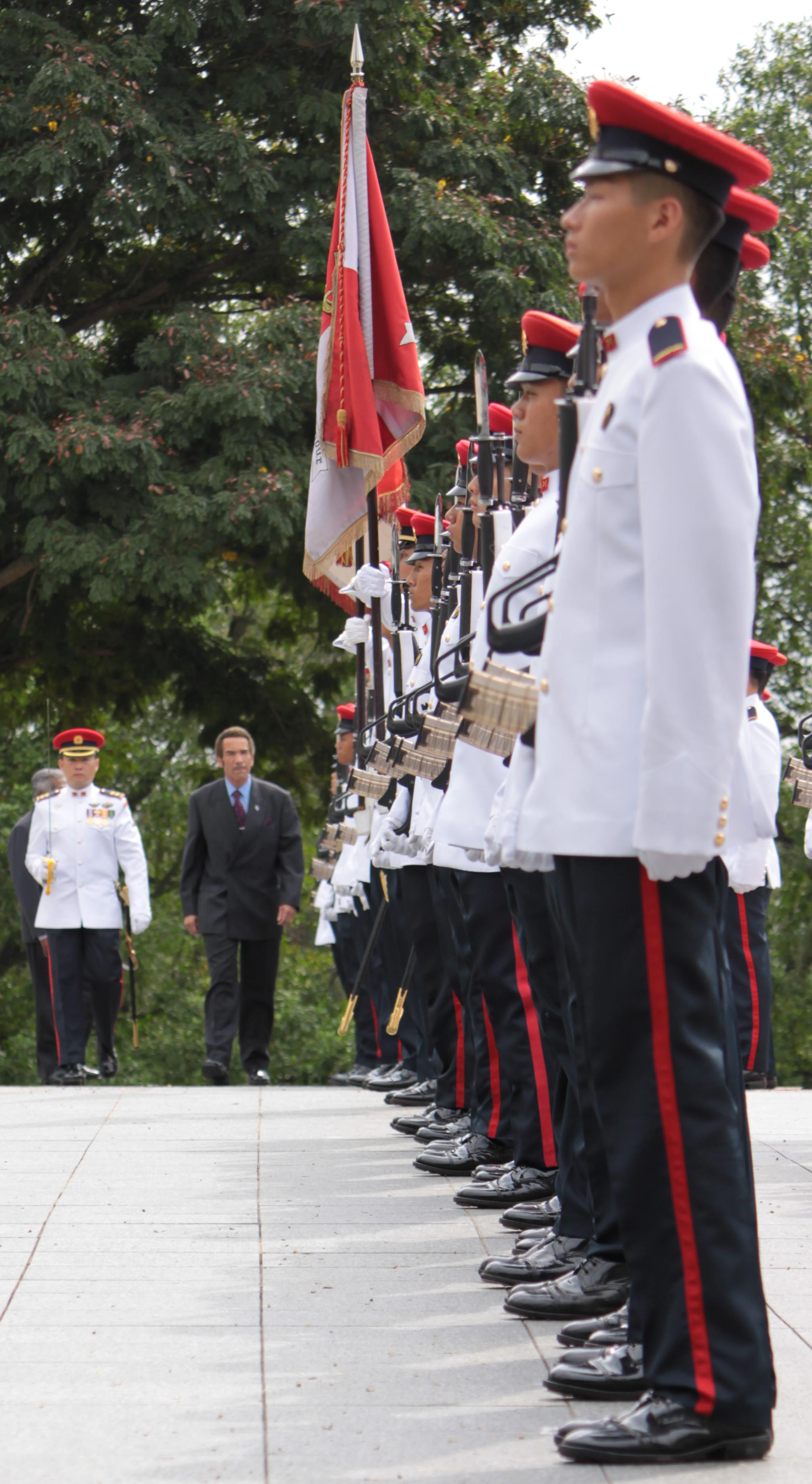
Members of the LECC mounting a guard of honour for Ian Khama, the President of Botswana.

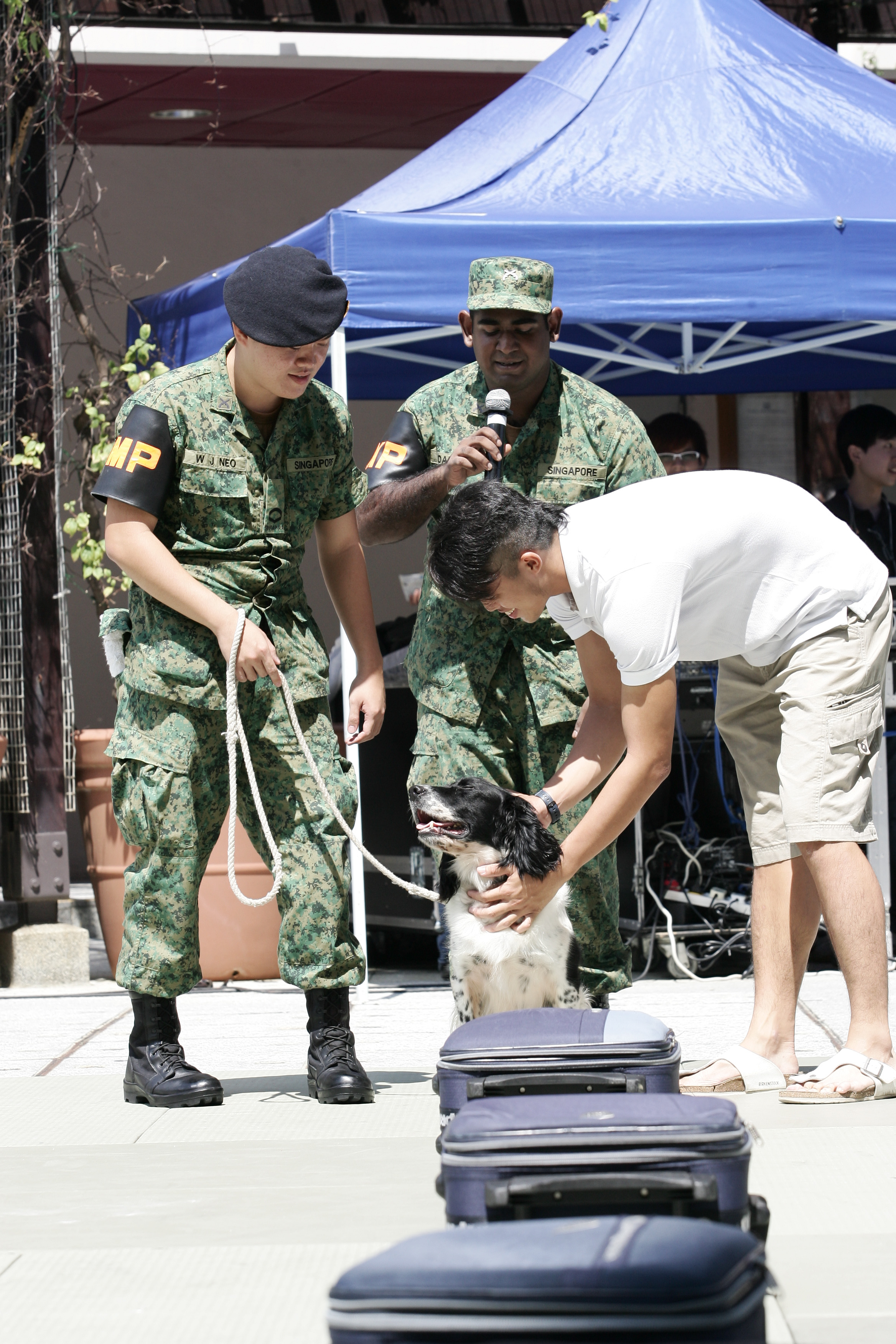
The Dog Unit performing a demonstration of their sniffer dogs' capabilities at Temasek Polytechnic.

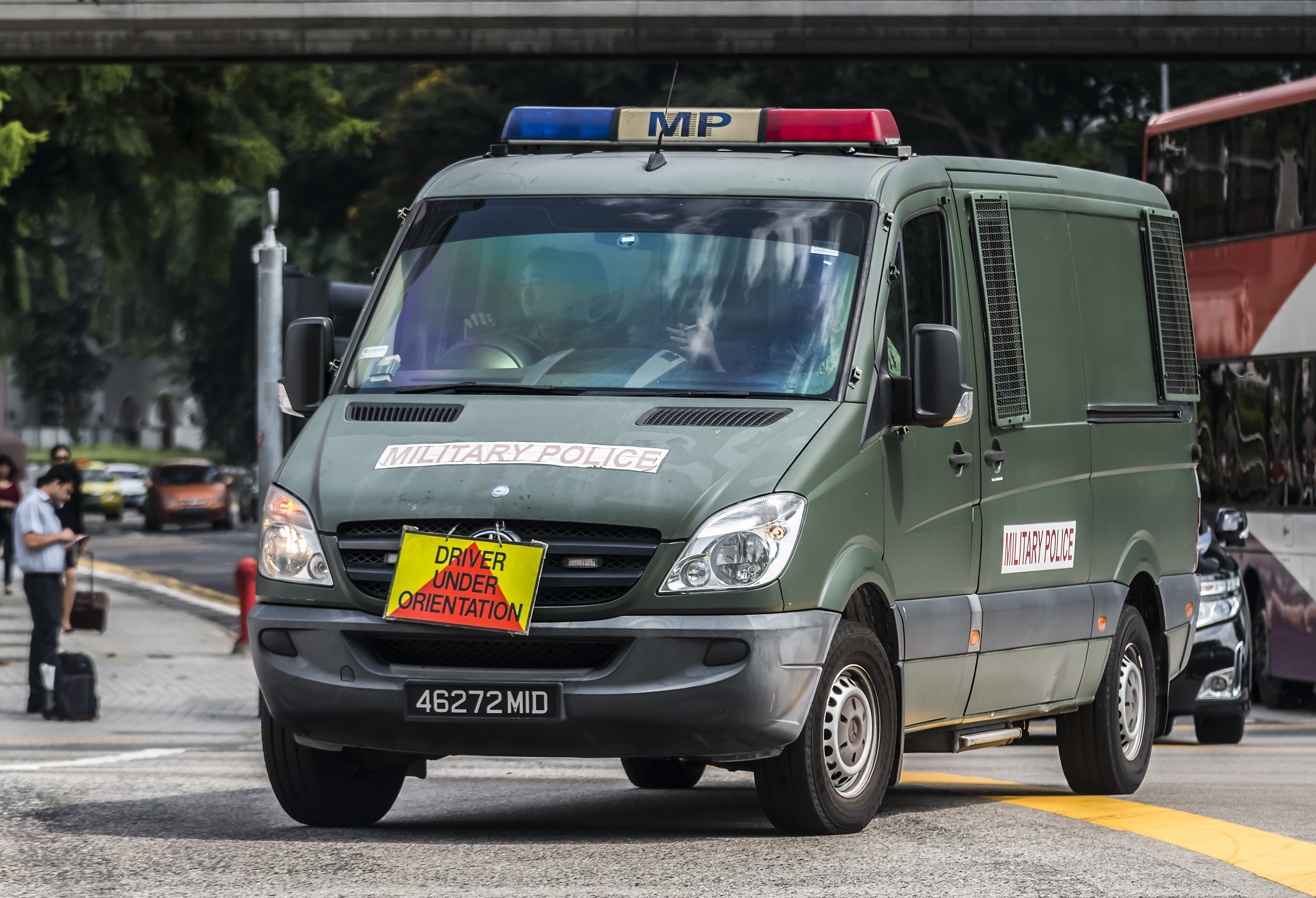
A Mercedes-Benz Sprinter of the SAFMPC, photographed during driver orientation.

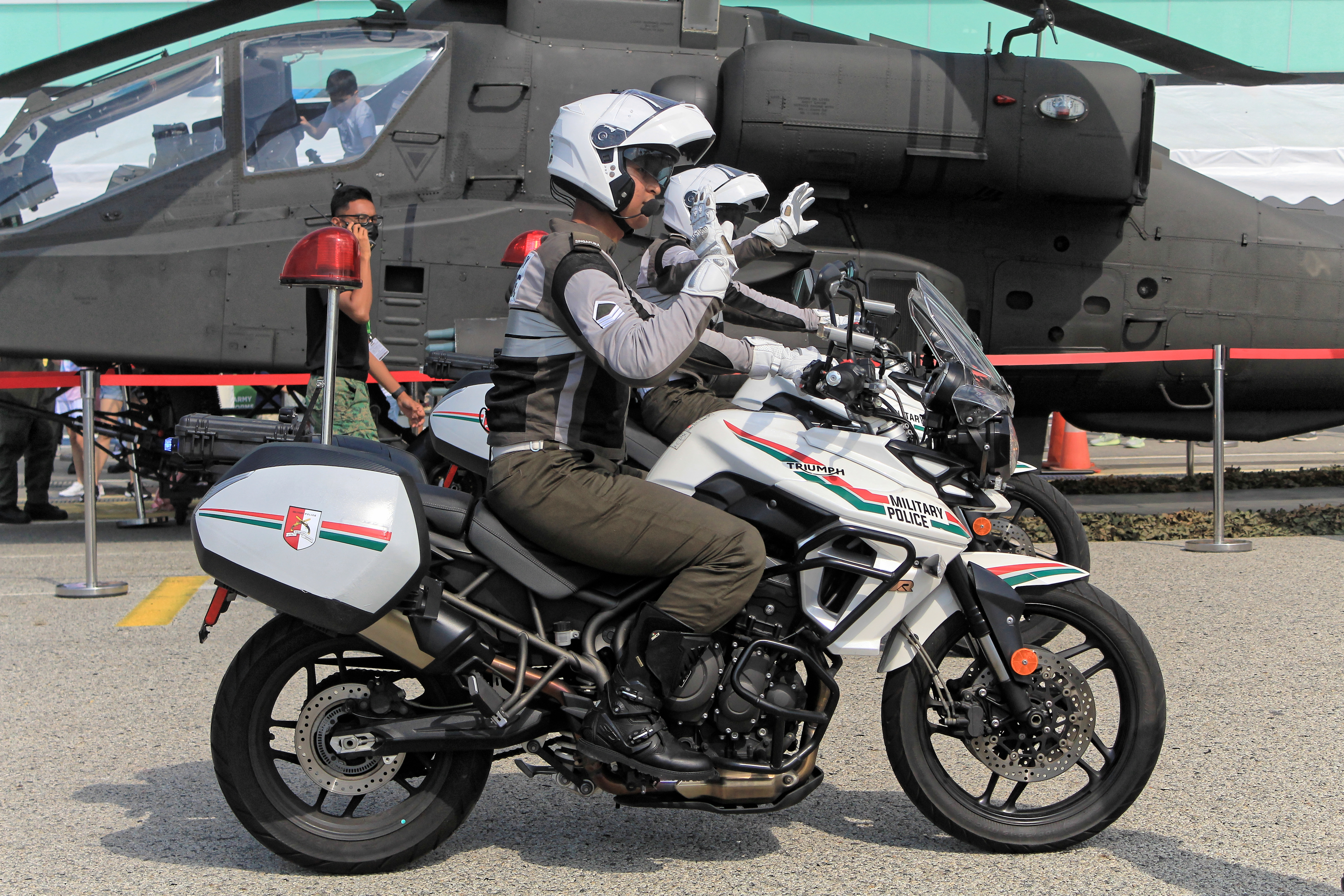
SAF Military Policemen on their motorcycles during the 2022 Army Open House.

The Military Police Enforcement Unit (MPEU) serves as the main enforcement arm of the SAF Military Police Command. It comprises three companies: the Law Enforcement and Ceremonial Company (LECC), the Support Company, and the Military Working Dog Unit (MWDU).

The LECC routinely conducts spot-checks in SAF camps, bases, vessels, and on personnel returning from overseas deployment. They are also trained to conduct anti-riot operations in SAF camps and the SAF Detention Barracks. The LECC also mounts the guard of honour contingent for military and state events.

The Support Company has a Presidential Guards Platoon that serves as ceremonial sentries at the Istana, as well as performing the guard mounting ceremony outside the Istana on the first Sunday of every month. The platoon's members are also trained in Silent Precision Drills, and form the Silent Precision Drill Squad (SPDS) which performs at the monthly Istana Change of Guards ceremony, as well as the National Day Parade and international military tattoos. The support company also includes a Traffic Platoon that performs escort duties and conducts patrols to ensure that SAF personnel driving military vehicles comply with traffic regulations. It also has a Security Operations Detachment that works closely with the Singapore Police Force to arrest SAF personnel who have deserted or gone AWOL or committed other military offences. It has an Escort and Processing Office Platoon in charge of registering and detaining suspects in holding cells at Mowbray Camp.

The MWDU is in charge of training sniffer dogs and guard dogs and carrying out operations involving these dogs.

Lastly, there is a Special Security and Protection (SSP) Platoon that provides close protection cover for key appointment holders in the SAF and Ministry of Defence (MINDEF).

=== Security Troopers ===
Security Troopers have replaced the Regimental Police in the Singapore Army. Security Troopers from the 8th Battalion, Singapore Infantry Regiment (8 SIR) provide security coverage at SAF camps, bases and military installations around Singapore, while Security Troopers from the 9th Battalion, Singapore Infantry Regiment (9 SIR) provide security coverage at key installations such as Changi Airport, Sembawang Wharves and Jurong Island. The SAF Military Police Command also provides security coverage at the Ministry of Defence (MINDEF) headquarters at Bukit Gombak.

=== SAF Detention Barracks ===
The SAF Military Police Command operates the SAF Detention Barracks, currently the only military prison in Singapore.

=== Special Investigation Branch (SIB) ===
The Special Investigation Branch (SIB) carries out criminal investigations in the SAF and MINDEF for military-related offences, including drug offences, white-collar crimes and cybercrimes.

== Training ==
The Island Defence Training Institute (IDTI) conducts training for both active and reservist Military Police personnel and Security Troopers. The Security and Policing Leadership School (SPLS), one of four schools in IDTI, conducts a 13-week training course for Military Police specialist (non-commissioned officer) cadets.
