= Permanent staff instructor =

A permanent staff instructor (PSI) is a warrant officer class 2 (WO2), or senior non-commissioned officer (sergeant, staff sergeant or colour sergeant), of the Regular British Army who has been selected to instruct Army Reserve soldiers. Each AR unit has several PSIs attached to it. A normal rifle company in a Regular Army battalion has a single WO2, serving in the role of company sergeant major (CSM). An Army Reserve rifle company normally has two WO2s. One is the CSM, normally a part-time member of the Army Reserve, and the other is the seconded PSI, the only full-time member of the company. The PSI is meant to provide the reserve company with the benefit of his professional experience, as well as to ensure that the training and operation of the company adheres to the Army's methods and standards. The PSI is typically responsible for much of the company's administration work, and usually takes a particular role in the training of junior NCOs (corporals and lance-corporals, and equivalent).
