= Signals (Singapore Army) =

- Logo of the Signals Formation
- Active: March 1966 – present
- Country: Singapore
- Branch: Singapore Army
- Type: Military communications
- Part of: Singapore Armed Forces
- Garrison/HQ: Stagmont Camp
- Motto: "Speed Through Skill"
- Colors: Dark Blue
- Website: Official website

Commanders
- Chief Signal Officer: COL Dean Chua

Signals is the formation of the Singapore Army responsible for communications on multiple platforms and local networking on the battlefield. It also supports the Singapore Armed Forces (SAF) by developing the capacity for network-centric warfare in the form of Integrated Knowledge-based Command and Control (IKC2) and Command, Control, Communications, Computers and Intelligence (C4I) operations.

== History ==
The Signal formation originated in 1954 when the Signals Corps of the Singapore Volunteer Corps was reorganised to form the Independent Brigade Signal Squadron of the Singapore Military Forces. When Singapore merged with the Federation of Malaysia in 1963, the squadron was absorbed into the Malaysian Armed Forces as the 4th Federal Infantry Brigade Signal Squadron based at Fort Canning in Singapore. When the Malaysian Army's Royal Signals Regiment was reorganised in 1965, the squadron was renamed the 4th Malaysian Signal Squadron.

Following the separation of Singapore from Malaysia in August 1965, the 4th Malaysian Signal Squadron continued to operate in Singapore and the 56 Singaporeans (2 officers and 54 men) in the squadron continued serving until they were mustered out on 28 February 1966. On 1 March 1966, the Singaporeans who used to be in the 4th Malaysian Signal Squadron gathered at Beach Road Camp to form the 1st Signal Corps of the Singapore Armed Forces. In June 1966, the Singapore Armed Forces established a Communications and Electronics (C&E) Department in the General Staff Division of the Ministry of the Interior and Defence (MID) at Pearl's Hill.

On 6 February 1967, the MID Signal Battalion was created with personnel from the 1st Signal Corps forming the nucleus of the unit. The battalion's commanding officer was Captain Winston Choo, who later became Singapore's first defence chief.

On 28 March 1967, the SAFTI Signal Wing was established at Pasir Laba Camp to train signallers in signal communications and voice procedures. In 1968, the SAFTI Signal Wing became a separate unit and was renamed School of Signals.

The C&E Department was re-staffed and renamed HQ C&E in August 1970. In the same year, the former Ministry of the Interior and Defence (MID) split into the Ministry of Home Affairs and Ministry of Defence (MINDEF), so the MID Signal Battalion was renamed MINDEF Signal Battalion. The Signals formation also received the state colours and its regimental colours on 22 January 1977 from President Benjamin Henry Sheares.

On 1 February 1977, the 6th Signal Battalion (6 SIG) was created as a reserve signals battalion for the 6th Division (6 DIV). On 9 October 1978, the 9th Signal Battalion (9 SIG) was formed in Slim Barracks to train reservist signallers for the 9th Division (9 DIV).

On 1 March 1982, HQ C&E was reorganised to form HQ Signals. HQ Signals relocated to Stagmont Camp in 1988. Stagmont Camp, which used to be known as Kranji Wireless Station when it was used by the British Armed Forces as a high frequency transmitting station, then housed the 2nd Signal Battalion (2 SIG), the School of Signals, the Reserve Signal Training Centre, and HQ Signals.

In October 1982, the MINDEF Signal Battalion was renamed 1st Signal Battalion (1 SIG). In 1985, the Reserve Signal Training Centre took charge of 6 SIG and 9 SIG, which both trained reservist signallers. In 1987, 9 SIG moved from Slim Barracks to Selarang Camp, where HQ 9 DIV was located. In 1991, after 6 DIV was converted to a combined arms division, 6 SIG was placed under HQ 6 DIV in Mandai Hill Camp.

On 31 March 2003, the Signal Institute (SI) was formed as an amalgamation of the School of Signals, Signal Training Centre, and the training branch of HQ Signals. In 2004, the Signals formation developed the Integrated Knowledge-based Command and Control (IKC2) concept as a new way of perceiving command and control. In 2006, HQ Signals was redesignated as HQ Signals and Command Systems. In 2010, the Command, Control, Communications, Computers and Intelligence, Surveillance and Reconnaissance (C4ISR) battalions were created to enhance the Singapore Armed Forces' capabilities.

== Operations ==
The Signal formation has participated in humanitarian aid operations. In the aftermath of the 1990 Luzon earthquake in the Philippines, signallers were deployed to Baguio and Cabanatuan to support the Singaporean medical relief team there and distribute medicine to affected villages in those two cities. For about two months in 1991, signallers were also sent to Kuwait to provide communications support for the United Nations humanitarian mission during the Gulf War.

== Organisation ==
The Signal formation comprises HQ Signals and Commands Systems, the Signal Institute (SI), and an undisclosed number of active and reservist battalions. Each of the Singapore Army's combined arms divisions – 3rd Division, 6th Division and 9th Division – has a signals battalion attached to it, and every brigade within each division also has a signals company attached to the brigade's headquarters.

HQ Signals and Commands System and the Signal Institute are based in Stagmont Camp, while the other battalions are based in other camps such as Mandai Hill Camp and Selarang Camp to provide support to their respective divisions.

HQ Signals and Command Systems

9th Signal Battalion

10th Command, Control, Communications, Computers and Intelligence Battalion

17th Command, Control, Communications, Computers and Intelligence Battalion

161st Command, Control, Communications, Computers and Intelligence Battalion

114th Command, Control, Communications, Computers and Intelligence Battalion

== See also ==
- Military communications
