= SAF Medical Corps =

Singapore Armed Forces Medical Corps
- Logo of the SAF Medical Corps
- Active: 3 November 1967 – present
- Country: Singapore
- Branch: Singapore Army; Republic of Singapore Navy; Republic of Singapore Air Force
- Type: Medical corps
- Part of: Singapore Armed Forces
- Garrison/HQ: Nee Soon Camp
- Mottos: "To Seek Excellence; To Save Lives; To Serve the SAF"
- Colors: Dark Blue
- Website: Official website

Commanders
- Chief of Medical Corps: Colonel (DR) Mark Tan Zhong Wei

The Singapore Armed Forces Medical Corps (SAF Medical Corps) is the medical corps of the Singapore Armed Forces (SAF) that provides medical services to the Army, Navy and Air Force. The Medical Corps establishes policies and directs the full implementation of quality force health, medical force protection, operational support, medical information technology, medical manpower and logistics, as well as its medical inspectorate within the Singapore Armed Forces.

== History ==
The SAF Medical Corps traces its origins back to 1901 with the formation of the ambulance and bearer section of the Singapore Volunteer Artillery Corps when Singapore was still a British colony. The Medical Corps was largely made up of personnel who volunteered their services and was not formally part of the defence of Singapore until 1967, when the Senior Medical Officer's department was formed. In 1972, HQ Medical Services was established to oversee all military medical services and policies within the Singapore Armed Forces. In 1974, the Singapore Armed Forces began recruiting medical doctors for National Service.

== Organisation ==
The SAF Medical Corps is subdivided into six organisations: the Headquarters Medical Corps, the SAF Medical Training Institute (SMTI), the Military Medicine Institute (MMI), the Army Medical Service, the Navy Medical Service, and the Republic of Singapore Air Force Medical Service.

The SAF Medical Training Institute provides vocational training for combat medics and combat medic specialists, who are then posted to the medical services of the Army, Navy and Air Force.

The Military Medicine Institute provides specialised medical and dental services and in-patient care. It is also in charge of the operations of medical centres in all the camps and military bases in Singapore.

The Force Health Group (FHG) was established in 2021 after restructuring of the Force Medical Protection Command (FMPC), to ensure medical protection against chemical, biological, radiological (CBR) and occupational health hazards. FHG focuses on comprehensive prevention, early detection and effective medical response against CBR threats. The Biodefence Centre (BDFC) identifies and institutes appropriate interventional measures for biological threats. It also manages infectious disease outbreaks and ensures that environmental and public health standards are maintained.

The Medical Response Force (MRF) provides frontline medical support to the SAF during CBR incidents. The key accomplishments of FMPC include eliminating the risk of malaria on Pulau Tekong in 2007, formulating the SAF pandemic response plan during the 2009 swine flu pandemic and managing the 2015–16 Zika virus epidemic. Partners such as the Centre for Infectious Disease Epidemiology and Research (CIDER) also contribute to the SAF's ability to diagnose, detect and respond to infectious diseases and biological threats.
