= Specialist Cadet School =

Military training centre for non-commissioned officers in Singapore

- Logo of the Specialist Cadet School

Location
- Pasir Laba Camp; Singapore; 1°20′3.86″N 103°40′17.40″E

Information
- Former name: School of Section Leaders (SSL); School of Infantry Section Leaders (SISL); SAF Infantry Non-Commissioned Officers' School (SAFINCOS); School of Infantry Specialists (SISPEC)
- Type: Military training centre
- Motto: "With Pride We Lead"
- Established: 1 October 1970; 56 years ago
- Authority: Singapore Armed Forces
- Website: official website

The Specialist Cadet School (SCS, Chinese: 见习士官学府, Malay: Sekolah Kadet Pakar, Tamil: நிபுணத்துவ பயிற்சி அதிகாரி பள்ளி) is the military training centre for the Singapore Armed Forces' specialists, the equivalent of non-commissioned officers (NCOs) in other countries' armed forces. Made up of twelve companies divided into three schools (SCS I, SCS II, and SCS III), it is located in Pasir Laba Camp in the Western Water Catchment.

The three schools, along with the SAFWOS Leadership School (SAFWOS) and Specialist and Warrant Officer Advanced School (SWAS), form the Specialist and Warrant Officer Institute (SWI).

== History ==
The Specialist Cadet School has its origins in 1966 when NCOs in the Singapore Armed Forces were selected to serve as the first batch of instructors in the School of Section Leaders (SSL) of SAFTI Military Institute. As the Singapore Armed Forces expanded, the School of Infantry Section Leaders (SISL) was established on 1 October 1970 with a 21-week training course for NCOs. In 1979, after the military training system underwent a restructuring, high-performing SISL trainees were selected to undergo further training at the Officer Cadet School to become officers.

In 1980, HQ Infantry took control of SISL from SAFTI and shortened the training course from 21 weeks to 12 weeks. On 22 June 1981, SISL was restructured to have five companies (Alpha, Bravo, Charlie, Delta and Echo) and the Advanced Specialists Training Wing (ASTW). On 1 May 1982, SISL was renamed SAF Infantry Non-Commissioned Officers' School (SAFINCOS) and started conducting the Basic Infantry Section Leader Courses along with other advanced courses such as the Platoon Sergeant Course, Infantry Senior NCO Course, and the Reserve Infantry Senior NCO Course. In 1989, SAFINCOS took in its first batch of female trainees.

In 1992, SAFINCOS was renamed School of Infantry Specialists (SISPEC). It relocated from Pasir Laba Camp to Pulau Tekong in 1999, and the SISPEC compound at Rocky Hill Camp on Pulau Tekong was officially opened on 17 August 2000 by Major-General Ng Yat Chung, the Chief of Army. In 2003, SISPEC achieved ISO 9002 for the management of its Advanced and Basic Section Leader Courses. In 2006, SISPEC moved back to its new compound in Pasir Laba Camp. On 22 December 2008, the Singapore Armed Forces introduced a new rank, Specialist Cadet (SCT), specifically for specialist trainees at SISPEC.

In 2010, SISPEC was renamed Specialist Cadet School (SCS) and divided into three schools – SCS I, SCS II and SCS III – under the Specialist and Warrant Officer Institute (SWI), which also manages the SAFWOS Leadership School (SAFWOS) and Specialist and Warrant Officer Advanced School (SWAS).

== Training ==
SCS trainees start their training with a Foundation Term, during which they acquire infantry skills and knowledge to lead an infantry section. They complete a 12 km (7.5 mi) route march while completing challenges related to the skills they learnt in the past 8 weeks in Full Battle Order at the end of the Foundation Term.

After completing the Foundation Term, trainees who are selected to serve in the Infantry and Guards formations remain in SCS to continue with the Infantry/Guards Professional Term, while those selected to serve in other formations (e.g. Armour, Artillery, Combat Engineers, Medical Corps, Signals) are posted to their respective formations to continue their Professional Terms there.

Upon completion of the Professional Term, all the trainees undergo an eight-day Combined Arms Term in SCS and mark the end of their training with a graduation parade, during which they receive the rank of Third Sergeant. They are then posted to their respective units.
