= Pasir Laba Camp =

Military base in Singapore

- Western Water Catchment in Singapore
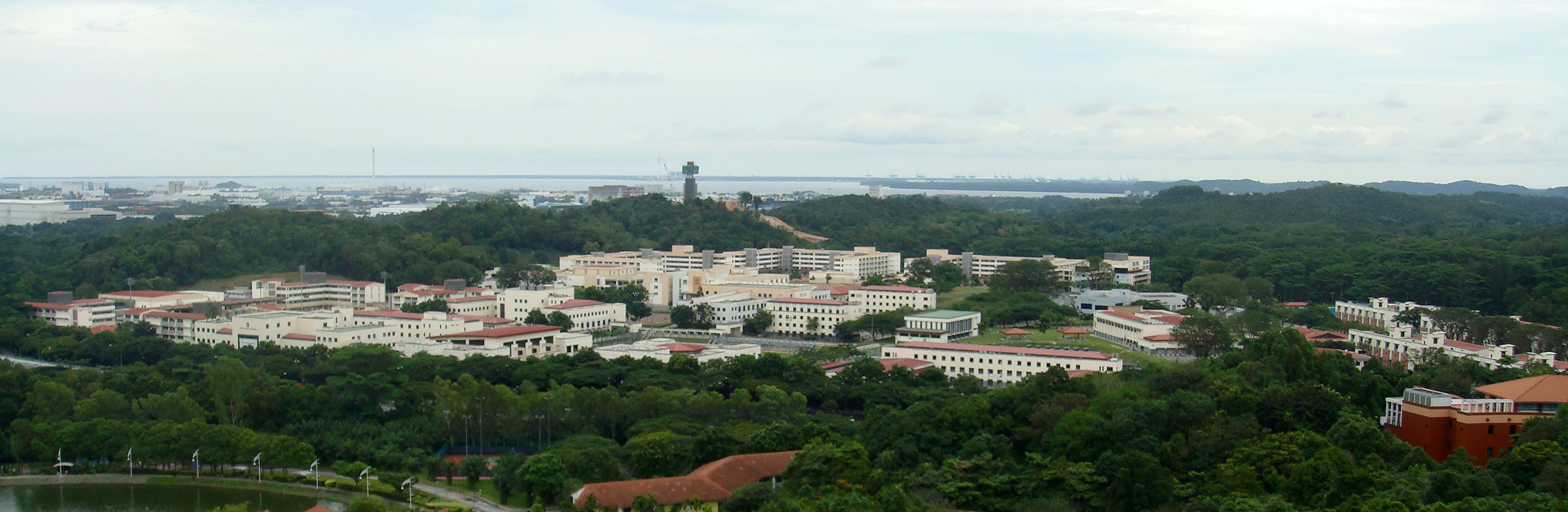
- Pasir Laba Camp as seen from the SAFTI Military Institute Tower

Site information
- Type: Military base
- Owner: Ministry of Defence (Singapore)
- Operator: Singapore Armed Forces
- Open to the public: no

Location
- Coordinates: 1°20′02.25″N 103°40′20.43″E

Site history
- Built: 1961

Garrison information
- Garrison: Specialist and Warrant Officer Institute; Specialist Cadet School; SAFWOS Leadership School; Army Training Doctrine Command; Training Resource Management Centre; Army Training Evaluation Centre; School of Infantry Weapons; SAF Military Intelligence Institute; 11th Command, Control, Communications, Computers and Intelligence Battalion; Army Fitness Centre; Basic Combat Training Centre

Pasir Laba Camp (IPA: /ˈpɑːseɪ ˌlɑːbɑː/ PAH-say LAH-bah) is a military base of the Singapore Armed Forces (SAF) located in Western Water Catchment, Singapore. It is home to the Specialist and Warrant Officer Institute, where specialists (non-commissioned officers) and warrant officers are trained. There are other SAF training centres and units based in Pasir Laba Camp as well. Along with Sungei Gedong Camp in Lim Chu Kang, Pasir Laba Camp is one of two military bases in Singapore which control access to the SAFTI Live Firing Area in Western Water Catchment.

== History ==
The Singapore government cleared Pasir Laba Road of squatter settlements in the 1960s so that a military camp, known as the Singapore Armed Forces Training Institute (SAFTI), could be constructed for the Singapore Armed Forces (SAF) to use as a training and live firing ground. It was constructed at Pasir Laba Road since 1961, with preparations to construct the area. Other potential site such as Pulau Tekong were being considered since 1963 but in the end it was replaced by Basic Military Training Centre, where all basic military were consolidated there. The location was being selected as a main junction between PIE/Upper Jurong Road and Pasir Laba Road.

While the camp was under construction, the SAF Training Institute (SAFTI) was temporarily housed at Jurong Town Primary School. On 18 June 1966, the SAFTI was officially opened.

In 1980, the School of Infantry Specialists and School of Infantry Weapons, along with HQ Infantry, were moved to the SAFTI premises. However, only the Officer Cadet School was allowed to use the name "SAFTI" for its location; other units based there had to identify themselves as being in "Pasir Laba Camp". On 31 May 1986, Pasir Laba Camp was renamed SAFTI and all units based there were allowed to use the name "SAFTI". This continued until June 1995 when the Officer Cadet School and other officer schools were moved to a new complex, the SAFTI Military Institute, at Upper Jurong Road. The original SAFTI premises then reverted to its old name as Pasir Laba Camp.

In 2001, then-President SR Nathan paid a visit to the camp to observe live-fire exercises.

As the Singapore Army expanded, new training centres such as the Basic Combat Training Centre, People's Defence Force Training Centre and Infantry Training Centre, were established at Pasir Laba Camp to meet the Army's training needs. On 1 July 2004, as part of the Army's restructuring, the three centres merged to form the Infantry Training Institute (ITI). The ITI shifted to Jurong Camp II in 2008, which provides better training facilities and easier access to various training areas. The Basic Combat Training Centre was closed in December 2009 and became the Pasir Laba Ammunition Depot.

In October 2013, the SAF announced the opening of the Multi-Mission Range Complex (MMRC), which serves as its firing range.

== Organisation ==
The Singapore Army's Training and Doctrine Command (TRADOC) is based in Pasir Laba Camp, along with the Specialist Cadet School and SAFWOS Leadership School, where specialists (non-commissioned officers) and warrant officers are trained. Other training schools in Pasir Laba Camp include the School of Military Intelligence and School of Infantry Weapons.

The Training Resource Management Centre, which controls and maintains the SAFTI Live Firing Area and other military training areas around Singapore, is located in Pasir Laba Camp. On 4 October 2013, the Multi-Mission Range Complex, an indoor firing range, was opened in Pasir Laba Camp. Its location is also critical in protecting Tuas Checkpoint, Jurong Industrial Estate, Tuas Depot, Tuas Megaport, Woodlands Checkpoint, Tengah Depot, Soon Lee Bus Park, Bulim Bus Depot and Singapore Rail Test Centre.
