= First sergeant =

Military rank in several countries

First sergeant is typically a senior non-commissioned officer rank, used in many countries.

== Singapore ==
First sergeant is a specialist in the Singapore Armed Forces. First sergeants are the most senior of the junior specialists, ranking above second sergeants, and below Staff Sergeants. The rank insignia for a First Sergeant features the three chevrons pointing down shared by all specialists, and two chevrons pointing up.

In combat units, First Sergeants are very often platoon sergeants or given the responsibility for independently operating detachments of support weapons. They are often given instructional billets as well in training schools. First sergeants normally answer to the company sergeant major, assisting the latter in the mentorship, guidance and command of the more junior specialists (Third and Second Sergeants) who are section commanders.

Specialist ranks of the Singapore Armed Forces
Insignia					
Rank	Third sergeant	Second sergeant	First sergeant	Staff sergeant	Master sergeant
Abbreviation	3SG	2SG	1SG	SSG	MSG

== United States ==
In the United States, a first sergeant generally serves as the senior enlisted advisor (SEA) of a unit, such as a company, battery, or troop, or a USAF squadron or higher level unit. (USA and USMC squadrons and battalions, as well as all higher-level units, have a Command Sergeant Major [USA] or Sergeant Major [USMC] as the SEA.) While the specifics of the title may differ between the United States Army, Marine Corps, and Air Force, all first sergeants can be identified by the presence of a lozenge-shaped (colloquially "diamond") figure on their rank insignia.

=== Armed Forces ===
First sergeant
- Army and Marine Corps insignia
- Country: United States
- Service branch: United States Army; United States Marine Corps
- Abbreviation: 1SG (USA); 1stSgt (USMC)
- Rank group: Non-commissioned officer
- NATO rank code: OR-8
- Pay grade: E-8
- Formation: 1781
- Next higher rank: Sergeant major (USA); Sergeant major (USMC)
- Next lower rank: Master sergeant (USA); Gunnery sergeant (USMC)

==== United States Army ====
The rank of "first sergeant" has existed in the American Army since 1781, when a fifth sergeant was added to the table of organization for Continental Army infantry regiments. Previously, under the tables of organization approved by the Continental Congress in 1776 and 1779, there were four and three sergeants, respectively, authorized in each company. The sergeants were numbered in order of seniority, and the "first sergeant" was simply the senior sergeant in the company, but not a separate rank. After the 1781 Battle of Green Spring, Ebenezer Denny called the company first sergeant "the most important officer."

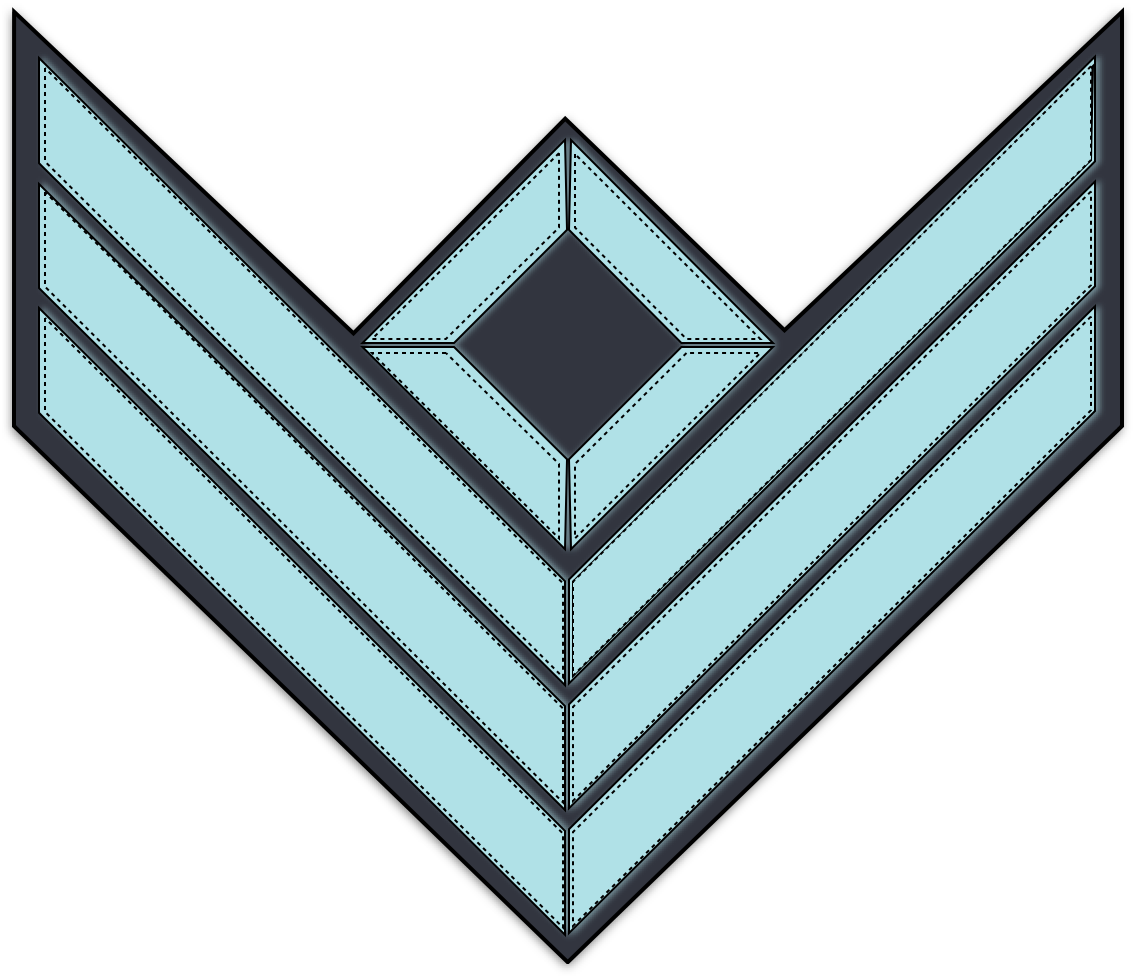
1851 First Sergeant Insignia (infantry)

In 1833, first sergeant and orderly sergeant became separate pay grades, ranking below sergeants major and quartermaster sergeants, but above sergeants. In 1851, first sergeant was combined with the separate rank of orderly sergeant.

World War I First sergeant rank insignia

In the United States Army, since 1958, the rank of first sergeant (abbreviated 1SG) is considered a temporary rank in E-8 pay grade, ranking above sergeant first class (SFC), and below sergeant major (SGM) or command sergeant major (CSM). While first sergeant is equal in paygrade to master sergeant (MSG), the two ranks have different responsibilities. Both ranks are identical as indicated by three chevrons (standard sergeant insignia) above three inverted arcs ("rockers"), an arrangement commonly referred to as "three up and three down", though the first sergeant has the pierced lozenge "diamond" in the middle. A first sergeant is generally senior to a master sergeant in leadership matters, though a master sergeant may have more general military authority such as when in charge of a military police (MP) section.

1920 First Sergeant Insignia

Master sergeants are laterally appointed to first sergeant upon selection by senior Department of the Army leadership; qualified sergeants first class are promoted, depending on available billets and opportunities. A promotable sergeant first class, or a master sergeant, may be selected for promotion to, or appointment as, a first sergeant, but will continue to wear the initial rank until successful completion of first sergeant leadership school, when the 1SG insignia of rank is authorized ("getting one's diamond"). Upon reassignment to a non–first sergeant billet, the soldier reverts to rank of master sergeant, unless promoted to the E-9 rank of SGM or CSM. First sergeants can retire at that rank, if they so choose, as long as they have completed first sergeant school and served satisfactorily in rank.

CSM is a leadership position that is a higher ranking equivalent of 1SG on a battalion level or higher command, while SGM is an MOS-specific technical equivalent to a MSG on a battalion level or higher command or in certain specialty billets.

The position of first sergeant is the highest US Army NCO rank position that is still in a direct "hands-on" leadership setting, as are command sergeant major (CSM/E-9) positions in a battalion command or higher level unit assignments of higher rank. CSMs have expanded administrative duties, and less direct leadership duty requirements with enlisted and junior NCO soldiers than do 1SGs.

First sergeants are generally the senior non-commissioned officers of company (battery, troop) sized units, and are unofficially but commonly referred to as "first sausage", "top", "top sergeant", "top soldier", "top kick", "first shirt", due to their seniority and their position at the top of the company's enlisted ranks. In the Bundeswehr, the German Army, the first sergeant (German: Kompaniefeldwebel) is colloquially called "mother of the company" (even for male soldiers), a concept also in place in the US Army. Only one percent of US Army soldiers are authorized to be promoted to or appointed as 1SG, so selection is extremely competitive and only the highest rated Soldiers "wear the diamond." They are sometimes referred to as "second hat" because the company commander may entrust them with important responsibilities, even over one of the company's lieutenants, especially junior lieutenants.

First sergeants handle the leadership and professional development of their soldiers, especially the non-commissioned officer development and grooming of enlisted soldiers for promotions. They also manage company logistical issues, supervise administrative issues, recommend and prepare enlisted soldiers for specialty and leadership schools, re-enlistment, career development and they manage the promotable soldiers within the company. First sergeants are the first step in disciplinary actions such as an Article 15 (non-judicial punishment) proceeding. A first sergeant may place a soldier under arrest and on restriction to quarters in certain cases, as well as manage all of the daily responsibilities of running the company/unit.

A first sergeant who has completed the US Army's first sergeant course and who satisfactorily served a tour of duty as a first sergeant, will retire as a first sergeant, even if they later serve as a master sergeant until honorable retirement.

Historically, Army National Guard Soldiers, who often remained in uniform under Title 32, USC state status, until days or weeks shy of their 62nd birthday, often stayed in one unit for decades, especially with cases of senior enlisted promotions or appointments. After the mass mobilization of Guard troops in the Persian Gulf War in 1991, many states began a statewide promotion system, resulting in Soldiers transferring units frequently. This generally brought an end to the long-serving first sergeants, fondly known by other Soldiers as "Top For Life," "TFL "

===== Insignia =====
Beginning in 1821, first sergeants were recognizable by wearing a red worsted waist sash (along with all other senior sergeant grades), while all junior sergeant grades had to discard this item. In 1872, sashes were eliminated for all ranks (except for general officers who retained their buff sashes until 1917). Though the sergeant major and quartermaster sergeant already had distinctive staff NCO rank insignia, it was not until 1847 that the first sergeant received the characteristic lozenge, or diamond, with the three chevrons of a sergeant as its insignia of rank.

==== United States Marine Corps ====
In the United States Marine Corps, first sergeant (abbreviated 1stSgt) is a permanent rank and ranks above gunnery sergeant and below sergeant major and master gunnery sergeant. It is equal in grade to master sergeant (E8), although the two ranks have different responsibilities. A first sergeant has command leadership responsibilities and serves as the senior enlisted adviser to the commander at the company, battery or detachment level, while master sergeants have technical responsibilities within their respective occupational fields, and serve important leadership roles within various company or battery sections. Master sergeants may also perform staff functions at the battalion/squadron level or above. Unlike first sergeants and master sergeants in the U.S. Army, no lateral movement is possible between the two ranks in the Marine Corps; they are permanent appointments and require a change in occupational specialty. This was true until January 2026, when the USMC transitioned nine master sergeants to first sergeant in an E-8 redesignation program in both the active and reserve forces. The E-8 redesignation program involves training to ensure that new first sergeants are capable of leading larger groups of Marines and advocating for them, while maintaining discipline and military conduct. The USMC has announced that in 2027 they plan to pilot a program to allow first sergeants to transition to master sergeant for greater flexibility.

In general, gunnery sergeants (E-7) elect a preference on their fitness reports, which are considered before promotion. Ultimately, those selected for either rank are appointed based on suitability, previous duty assignments, and the needs of the Marine Corps. Later in their careers, first sergeants are eligible to be considered for promotion to sergeant major, while master sergeants can be promoted to master gunnery sergeant.

The grade of first sergeant initially appeared in the Marine Corps in 1833, when Congress created the ranks of "first sergeant of the guard at sea" and "orderly sergeant of the post" (of which 30 billets for the rank were established). In 1872, the Corps replaced the title of orderly sergeant with the rank of first sergeant. The rank of first sergeant was a casualty of the rank realignment of 1947. It was reestablished in 1955.

==== United States Air Force ====
In the United States Air Force, first sergeants are special duty temporary ranks and positional billets. They may be given authority within their unit, but they do not outrank their non-first sergeant peers of the same grade. First sergeants are not guaranteed to be promoted to the next level pay grade of first sergeant. Often referred to as the "first shirt", or "shirt", the first sergeant is responsible for the morale, welfare, and conduct of all the enlisted members in a squadron and is the chief adviser to the squadron commander concerning the enlisted force. They are held by a senior enlisted member of a military unit who reports directly to the unit commander or deputy commander of operations. This positional billet is held by individuals of pay grades E-7 through E-9 (master sergeant, senior master sergeant and chief master sergeant), and is denoted on the rank insignia by a lozenge (known colloquially as a "diamond"). Most units have a master sergeant (E-7) in this position. Larger units use senior master sergeants (E-8) and chief master sergeants (E-9) as first sergeants. All first sergeants can retire at that rank, within their respective pay grade, if they so choose, as long as they have served satisfactorily in rank.

Insignia while serving as first sergeant
Pay grade	E-9	E-8	E-7
Insignia (1958–1991)			
Insignia (1991–present)			
Rank	Chief master sergeant	Senior master sergeant	Master sergeant

=== Law enforcement ===
Some U.S. law enforcement agencies, especially state police and highway patrol organizations, have first sergeants, who are typically in charge or command of a detachment, district, region, area, barracks, or post consisting of anywhere from ten to fifty or more troopers or officers. Most law enforcement first sergeants are mid-level management leaders, with ten to thirty or more years of service. The North Carolina State Highway Patrol first sergeants for example, must complete the 6-weeks advanced police management training institute at the Southern Police Institute (SPI) in Louisville, KY. Other states also use SPI, or Northwestern University IL or the FBI National Academy (FBINA) Quantico, VA.

Some such state agencies may have a first sergeant in charge of special state police or highway patrol units such as SWAT, K-9, aviation, personnel, major traffic accident reconstruction, research, public information, logistics, training, recruitment, internal affairs, accreditation, inspections, mounted, motorcycle, communications, detectives, administration, and other specialized sections or services other than general patrol.

Some municipal and county agencies also have a first sergeant. Civil law enforcement first sergeants are senior to sergeants and junior to lieutenants.

The insignia of such a first sergeant is usually similar to a military first sergeant but may only may have a chevron of three stripes with no bottom curved stripes "rockers", or just one or two rockers, but generally always have the lozenge under the chevrons. The rank insignia may be displayed by sewn-on sleeve shoulder stripes, slip-on epaulet stripes or pin-on metal stripes of black, silver or gold tone that may be pinned on the collar or epaulet.

== NATO code ==
While the rank of first sergeant is used in some NATO countries, it is ranked differently depending on the country.

NATO code	Country	English equivalent	
NATO code	Country	UK	US
OR-8		Warrant officer class 2	First sergeant
OR-7	Spain	Staff sergeant	Sergeant first class
OR-6	Belgium, Luxembourg, Portugal	Sergeant	Staff sergeant

== Gallery ==
Primeiro-sargento
(Angolan Army)

Sargento primero
(Argentine Army)

Eerste sergeant
(Belgian Land Component)

Sargento primero
(Bolivian Army)

Primeiro-sargento
(Brazilian Army)

Première sergent
(Kirundi: Sereja mu murwi wa mbere)
(Burundi Army)

Primeiro-sargento
(Cape Verdean National Guard)

Sargento primero
(Chilean Army)

Premier sergent
(Land Forces of the DR Congo)

Sargento primero
(Colombian National Army)

Sargento primero
(Army of Equatorial Guinea)

Primeiro-sargento
(Army of Guinea-Bissau)

Premier sergent
(Luxembourg Army)

ފަސްޓް ސާރޖަންޓް
Fast saarjant
(Maldives National Defence Force)

Sargento primero
(Mexican Army)

Primeiro-sargento
(Mozambican Army)

Primeiro-sargento
(Portuguese Army)

Primeiro-sargento
(Army of São Tomé and Príncipe)

First sergeant
(Singapore Army)

Sargento primero
(Spanish Army)

First sergeant
(United States Army)

== See also ==
- U.S. uniformed services pay grades
- United States Army enlisted rank insignia of World War I
- United States Army enlisted rank insignia of World War II

== References and notes ==
- U.S. Army Enlisted Rank Insignia - Criteria, Background, and Images
