= Platoon sergeant =

Senior enlisted member of a platoon

In many militaries, a platoon sergeant is the senior enlisted member of a platoon, who advises and supports the platoon's commanding officer in leading the unit.

== Singapore ==
In the Singapore Armed Forces, platoon sergeants serve as bridges between the platoon commander, or PC, and the rest of the platoon. They relay instructions from the platoon commander to the soldiers, and assume command of the platoon in the PC's absence in barracks or in the field. Platoon sergeants also have authority over the other junior commanders in the platoon. They are to be addressed as "Platoon Sergeant", or "PS" for short, regardless of rank.

While in camp, the platoon sergeant is responsible for the discipline and training of their soldiers, and also has a role in preparing the platoon for parades and ceremonies. In the field, the platoon sergeant is in charge of the soldiers' logistics and medical aid, and also ensures the platoon maintains formation when moving between locations while conducting a mission.

Among ful-time National Servicemen, or NSFs, platoon sergeants are usually chosen from among the third sergeants within a platoon. They are usually specialists who have graduated Specialist Cadet School with a Gold or Silver Bayonet, though they may also be chosen based on conduct and performance while serving in an active unit. Those who are chosen attend the Basic Warfighter-Platoon Sergeant (BWF-PS) Course, conducted at the Specialist and Warrant Officer Advanced School at Pasir Laba Camp, and assume their appointment upon completing the course.

Most platoon sergeants hold the rank of Second Sergeant (2SG), and promotion to this rank is usually determined by the soldier's parent unit. Upon reaching their Operationally Ready Date, NSF platoon sergeants are usually promoted to the rank of First Sergeant (1SG) within their first few cycles of reservist training. Regular specialists holding the appointment of platoon sergeant are usually first or staff sergeants, and will have completed their tour as a section commander before being considered for this appointment.

Specialist ranks of the Singapore Armed Forces
Insignia					
Rank	Third sergeant	Second sergeant	First sergeant	Staff sergeant	Master sergeant
Abbreviation	3SG	2SG	1SG	SSG	MSG

== United States ==
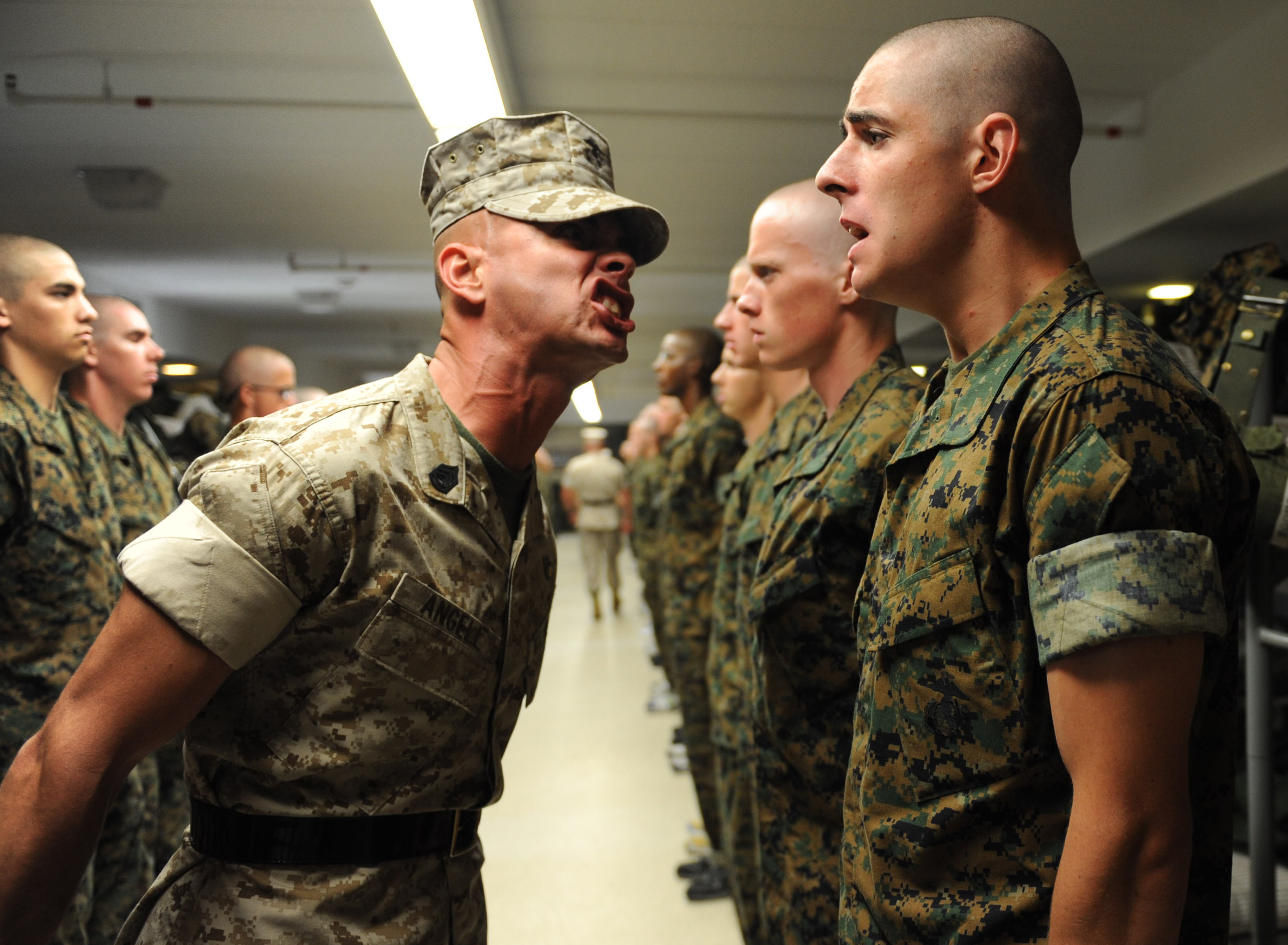
A platoon sergeant at the Officer Candidate School aboard Marine Corps Base Quantico, dedicated to training, educating, evaluating and screening the many candidates who go through the course and turning them into Marine leaders.

=== U.S. Army ===
In the United States Army, a platoon sergeant is usually a sergeant first class (E-7) and is the senior enlisted member of the platoon. From 1929 until 1942 (replaced by technical sergeant) and again from 1958 until 1988 (merged with sergeant first class), the separate rank title of platoon sergeant existed (abbreviated PSGT or PSgt.).

The platoon sergeant is the primary assistant and advisor to the platoon leader (and acts as the platoon leader in his or her absence). Unless the platoon leader has extensive prior experience as an enlisted member or warrant officer before being commissioned as a lieutenant, it is likely that the platoon sergeant will have a greater wealth of military experience due to the disparity in military service length between a new lieutenant and a sergeant first class. (Typically a platoon leader has less than three years of service, whereas a platoon sergeant has from 7 to 15 years of service.)

However, service experience is not a prerequisite for commissioning and command. Rather, as has been since the beginning of professional armies, the privilege of and eligibility for command is usually predicated primarily on rank and is entrusted to those who have earned it, on the combined basis of: innate aptitude (leadership and management) and intelligence (intellectual and emotional); completed education (civil and military) and training (tactical and technical); and demonstrated skills (physical and conceptual) and competencies (practical and theoretical).

Therefore, the platoon is usually commanded by a commissioned officer (normally a second lieutenant) as his/her first real command position after commissioning. Nonetheless, the wise and successful newly commissioned officer takes full advantage of the experience of the platoon sergeant by readily seeking and accepting the advice and counsel of a more experienced soldier and leader. Therefore, the platoon sergeant functions as the crucial conduit of interface between the soldier and the officer by bringing the experience of a senior noncommissioned officer into a sort of "on-the-job training" for the junior company-grade officer, helping to enable the officer to prepare for subsequent increases in levels of command.

On occasion, when a sergeant first class is not available, either organically within the platoon or from another unit, a responsible Staff Sergeant (E-6) will probably be appointed to fill the platoon sergeant position instead. Here is an excerpt from the Army's Field Manual titled "The Army Noncommissioned Officer Guide" (FM 7-22.7).

"While the 'Platoon Sergeant' is a duty position, not a rank, the platoon sergeant is the primary assistant and advisor to the platoon leader, with the responsibility of training and caring for soldiers. The platoon sergeant helps the commander to train the platoon leader and in that regard has an enormous effect on how that young officer perceives NCOs for the rest of his career. The platoon sergeant takes charge of the platoon in the absence of the platoon leader. As the lowest level senior NCO involved in the company METL [Mission Essential Task List], and individual tasks to soldiers in their squads, crews or equivalent small units."

=== U.S. Marine Corps ===
In the United States Marine Corps, the billet of platoon sergeant in a rifle platoon is usually held by a staff sergeant (E-6). In scout sniper, reconnaissance, weapons (i.e., crew-served weapons), armored vehicle (e.g., tank, assault amphibian, light armored reconnaissance), field artillery (both headquarters and firing platoons), and air defense (viz., LAAD) platoons, a gunnery sergeant (E-7) is usually the platoon sergeant.

In 1929 the rank of platoon sergeant was officially authorized. During World War II the rank of platoon sergeant was a "line" grade while staff sergeant with a bar instead of an inverted arc, or "rocker", was a staff grade. The separate rank title of platoon sergeant was eliminated in 1946, with all NCOs at this grade converting to staff sergeant. As in the past, the platoon sergeant is in charge of taking care of the Marines and the platoon's operational control while advising the platoon commander.

== See also ==
- Platoon
- Sergeant
- Non-commissioned officer
- Platoon guide
