= Digital and Intelligence Service =

Warfare branch of the Singapore Armed Forces

- Perkhidmatan Digital dan Perisikan (Malay) 国防数码防卫与情报军部队 (Chinese) மின்னிலக்க, உளவுத்துறைப் படை (Tamil)
- Crest of the Digital and Intelligence Service
- Founded: 28 October 2022; 3 years ago
- Country: Singapore
- Type: Cyber force
- Role: Hybrid warfare
- Part of: Singapore Armed Forces
- Mottos: "Defend and Dominate"
- March: "Digital and Intelligence Service March"
- Website: Official website

Commanders
- President of Singapore: Tharman Shanmugaratnam
- Minister for Defence: Chan Chun Sing
- Chief of Defence Force: VADM Aaron Beng
- Chief of Digital and Intelligence Service/Director Military Intelligence: MG Lee Yi-Jin
- Chief Expert, Digital and Intelligence Service: ME6 Noh Kok Tiong

Insignia
- Flag

- Logo

- State Colour

The Digital and Intelligence Service (DIS) is the digital service branch of the Singapore Armed Forces (SAF) responsible for providing military intelligence to the armed forces, building up the country's digital defence capabilities, and protecting the psychological defence of its military personnel. It was established on 28 October 2022, in response to the increased number of attacks by non-state actors, and the damage resulting from Russo-Ukrainian cyberwarfare.

== History ==
DIS was first announced on 2 March 2022 by Minister for Defence Ng Eng Hen during the Budget 2022 debate. In his speech, Ng highlighted the increase in attacks by non-state actors and resulting damage from the Russo-Ukrainian cyberwarfare to justify the necessity of a dedicated service branch to deal with hybrid warfare. The DIS was compared by The Straits Times with its closest existing equivalent abroad, Germany's Cyber and Information Domain Service.

The DIS was planned to comprise several groups within the Singapore Armed Forces (SAF) previously established to deal with such threats, which are the C4I Community created in April 2012, Defence Cyber Organisation in March 2017, SAF C4 Command in November 2017, and the Cybersecurity Task Force in December 2020. The DIS consolidates these organisations under one service branch dedicated to psychological defence, tackling digital domain threats, cybersecurity and military intelligence. It was projected to be formally established at the end of 2022.

On 2 August 2022, Parliament amended the Singapore Armed Forces Act and Constitution, formally placing the DIS under the SAF and granting the Chief of Digital and Intelligence Service (CDI) legal powers. The DIS was formally inaugurated on 28 October 2022 at the SAFTI Military Institute. The state colours were presented by President Halimah Yacob and the first Chief of Digital and Intelligence Service, Brigadier-General Lee Yi-Jin, was sworn into command.

== Structure ==
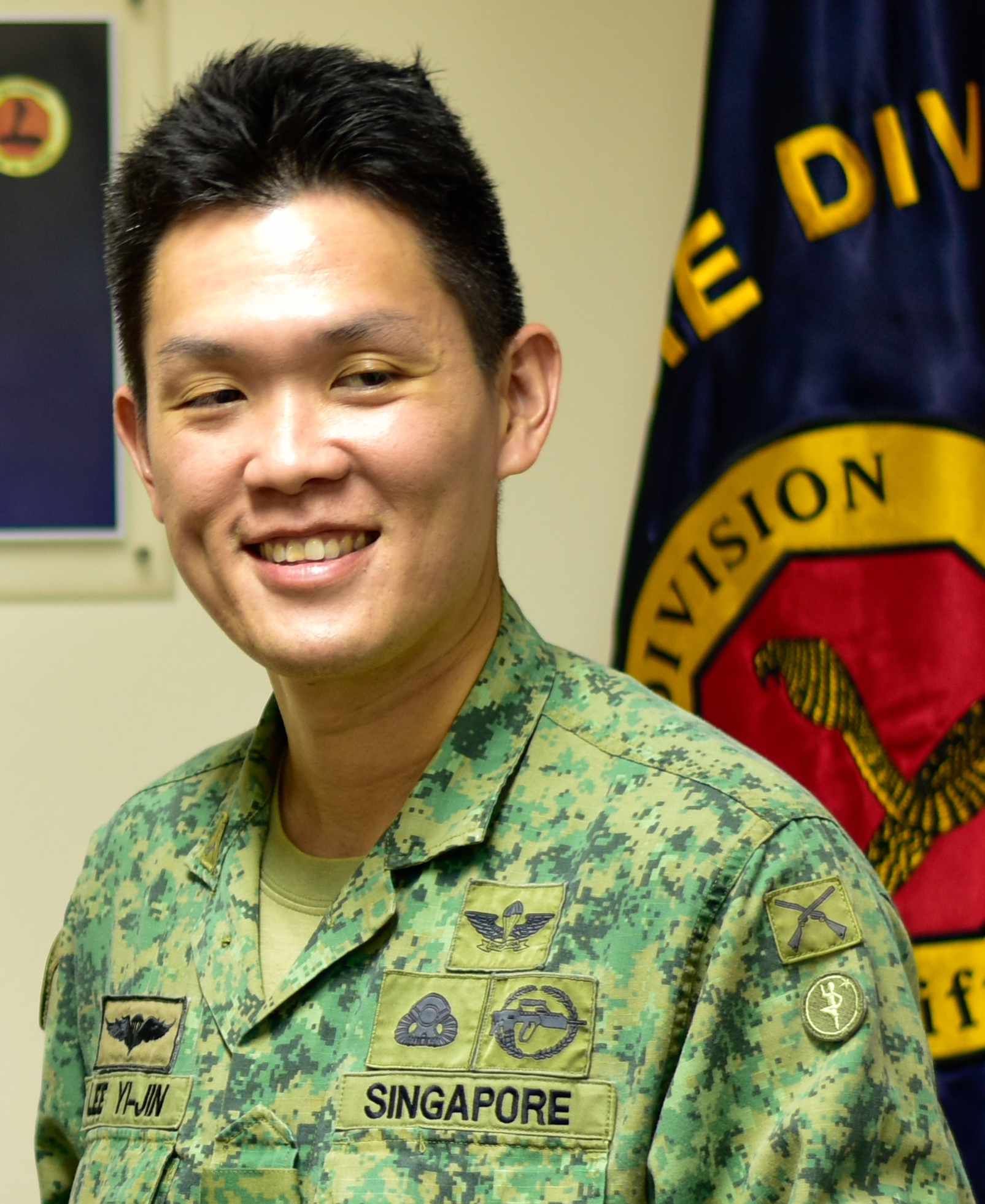
MG Lee Yi-Jin, Chief of Digital and Intelligence Service

When inaugurated in 2022, the DIS was made up of the Digital Ops-Tech Centre and 4 commands: the Joint Intelligence Command, SAF C4 Command/Cybersecurity Task Force, Digital Defence Command and DIS Training Command. The DIS Training Command was to be inaugurated in 2023. On 18 March 2025, the SAF C4 & Digitalisation Command, with the Digital Ops-Tech Centre placed under it, and a fifth command called the Defence Cyber Command was inaugurated.

=== Defence Cyber Command ===
The Defence Cyber Command (DCCOM) comprises the Cybersecurity Task Force (formerly under the SAF C4 Command/Cybersecurity Task Force) and the Defence Cyber Organisation. The command is charged with defending the cybersecurity of the entire nation and cooperates closely with the Cyber Security Agency through the Cyber Protection Group.

=== Digital Defence Command ===
The Digital Defence Command consists of the Electronic Protection Group (EPG) and Psychological Defence Group (PDG), which assist the SAF in electronic protection and psychological defence respectively.

=== DIS Training Command ===
The DIS Training Command facilitates the training of DIS personnel.

=== Joint Intelligence Command ===
The Joint Intelligence Command delivers intelligence support for the SAF. It is the amalgamation of the Imagery Support Group (ISG) and Counter-Terrorism Intelligence Group (CTIG).

=== SAF C4 & Digitalisation Command ===
The SAF C4 & Digitalisation Command (SAFC4DC) secures and handles the SAF's Command, Control, Communications and Computers (C4) capabilities. The C4 Operations Group (C4OG), Digital Ops-Tech Centre and SAF AI Centre operates under it.

== Background ==
=== Personnel ===
The SAF plans to encourage male members to join the DIS, and is working with Nanyang Technological University to create an education scheme to train digital specialists. The service length of DIS personnel will be four years, which is twice the length of national service in Singapore. In addition, DIS will also recruit personnel specialising in data science, psychology, linguistics, anthropology and geography. Full-time national servicemen will also be enlisted into the DIS.

=== Uniforms ===
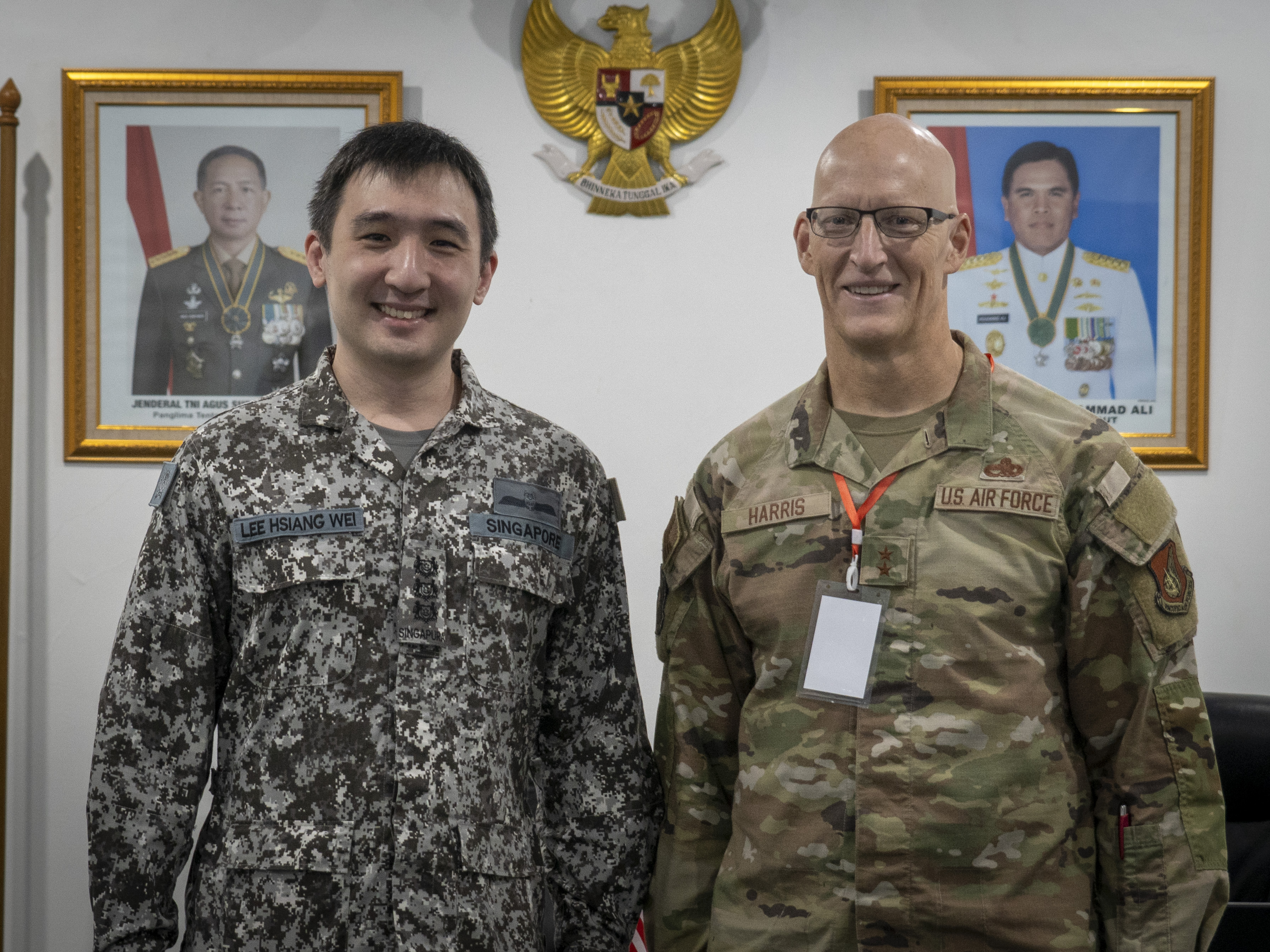
COL Lee Hsiang Wei (left) in the No. 4 pixelated grey uniform of the DIS

The No. 1 ceremonial uniform of the DIS consists of a white top, grey trousers and a grey beret. The No. 4 uniforms are pixelated grey.

== List of chiefs of Digital and Intelligence Service ==
No.	Name	Term
1	Lee Yi-Jin	28 October 2022 – present

== See also ==
- Cyber and Information Domain Service, German counterpart
