= Basic Military Training Centre =

Military camp in Singapore

Coordinates: 1°24′20.80″N 104°1′54.03″E

- Country: Singapore
- Branch: Singapore Army
- Type: Basic military training
- Size: Five schools in three camps
- Part of: Singapore Armed Forces
- Garrison/HQ: Ladang Camp; Rocky Hill Camp; Kranji Camp II
- Motto: "Excel Through Basics"

The Basic Military Training Centre (BMTC) is a military training facility of the Singapore Armed Forces (SAF). It comprises five schools organised into three camps, of which two are based on Pulau Tekong, an island off the northeast coast of mainland Singapore, while the third camp is in Kranji in northwest Singapore. As its name indicates, it provides basic military training for the majority of recruits enlisted in the SAF.

== Overview ==
BMTC has five schools organised into three camps. Ladang Camp (BMTC Schools I, II and III) and Rocky Hill Camp (BMTC School IV) are on Pulau Tekong. BMTC School V is at Kranji Camp II. Each BMTC School is further subdivided into Companies.

Access to Pulau Tekong and Kranji Camp II requires prior approval from the Ministry of Defence. There are ferry services between Pulau Tekong and the Singapore Armed Forces Ferry Terminal (SFT) at Changi on mainland Singapore. Next to the ferry terminal is the National Service Landmark, a life-sized statue of a soldier bearing the Singapore Armed Forces flag.

BMTC is equipped with various facilities, including a five-storey housing block for each company, as well as sports facilities such as running tracks, indoor gyms and swimming pools, and supporting amenities such as cookhouses, canteens, medical centres and e-marts. On the training grounds, there are training sheds, a firing range simulator, as well as rifle, grenade and battle inoculation course ranges. All buildings in Ladang Camp are connected by sheltered walkways. The Tekong Highway located north of Ladang Camp leads to Rocky Hill Camp.

== Incidents ==
In March 2017, BMTC mistakenly published the full NRIC numbers alongside photo portraits of a batch of graduating National Service (NS) recruits online for almost a day. The personal data was made available via a Google Drive document link that was shared on the BMTC's Facebook page. BMTC commander Colonel Desmond Yeo apologised and explained that the publication of the personal data was an "oversight" and the BMTC removed the link by noon the day after the data was made available after it had realised what had happened.

== See also ==
- National service in Singapore
