= SAFTI Military Institute =

Military academy of the Singapore Armed Forces

- Motto: To Lead, To Excel, To Overcome
- Type: Military institute
- Established: 14 February 1966; 60 years ago
- Commandant: BG Tan Tiong Keat
- Location: 500 Upper Jurong Road, Singapore 638364, Singapore; 1°20′2″N 103°40′49″E
- Campus: 88 hectares (220 acres)
- Website: safti.mindef.gov.sg

The SAFTI Military Institute (Chinese: 新加坡武装部队军训学院, Malay: Institut Ketenteraan SAFTI, Tamil: சிங்கப்பூர் ஆயுதப்படைப் பயிற்சி நிலையத்தின் ராணுவப் பயிற்சிக்கழகம்) is a military institute of the Singapore Armed Forces (SAF) comprising five schools: Goh Keng Swee Command and Staff College, three SAF Advanced Schools, and the Officer Cadet School. Located on an 88 ha (217 acres) campus in Jurong West, it was originally established in 1966 in Pasir Laba Camp as the Singapore Armed Forces Training Institute (SAFTI) before it moved to its current location in 1995 and became known as the SAFTI Military Institute.

== History ==
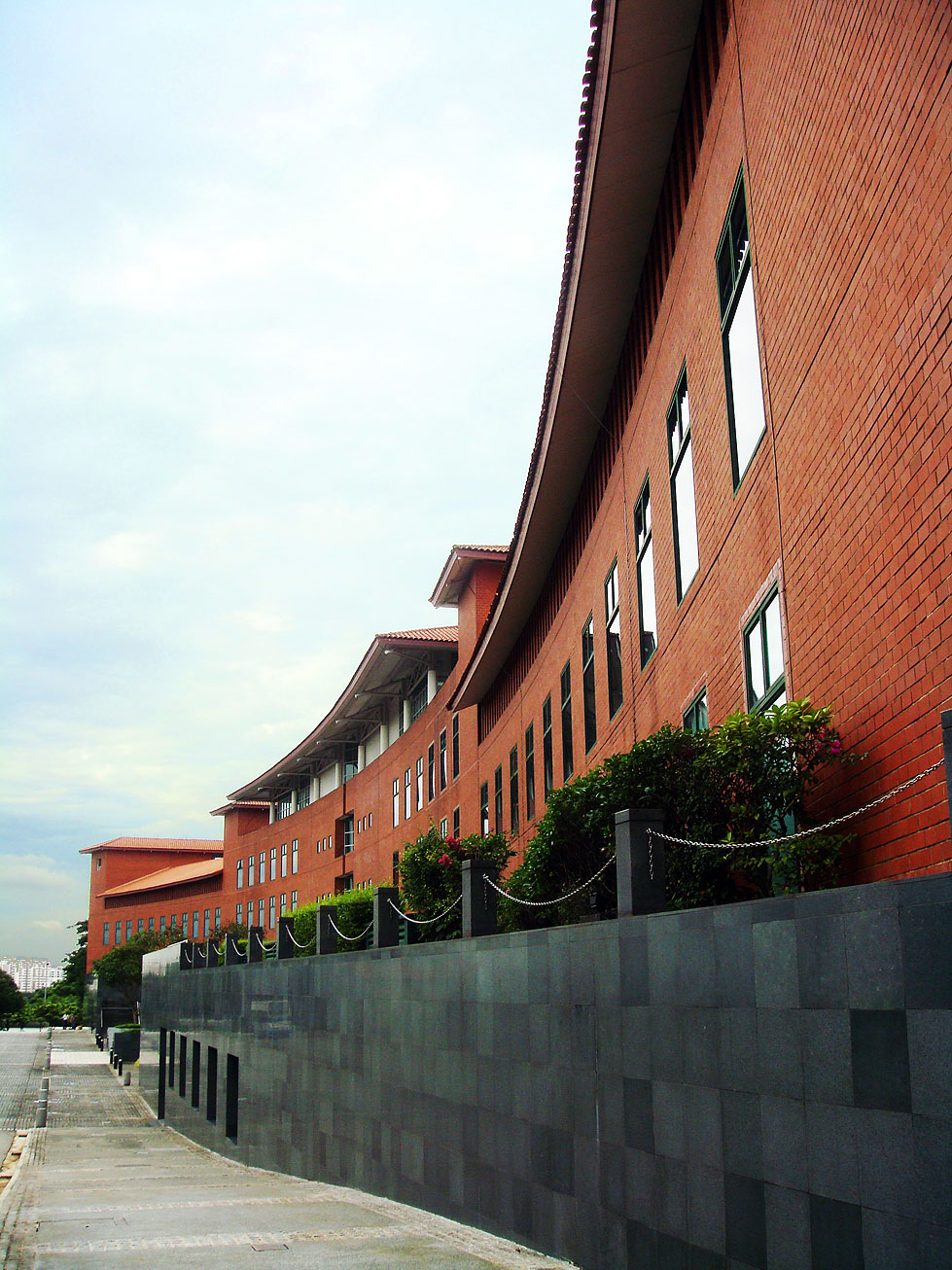
The Officer Cadet School within the SAFTI Military Institute as seen from the northwest

Although the SAFTI Military Institute is an amalgamated institution, it draws much of its heritage from the original Singapore Armed Forces Training Institute (SAFTI), which was officially opened on 14 February 1966 at Pasir Laba Camp.

On 14 November 1987, Second Minister for Defence Lee Hsien Loong announced that a new SAFTI Military Institute would be built on a 50 ha (124 acres) plot of land in Jurong West. Construction started in June 1988 and ended by February 1991. The SAFTI Military Institute housed the Officer Cadet School, School of Advanced Training for Officers, and the Singapore Command and Staff College. The original SAFTI name is preserved in the new name of the institute, as well as in the name of the bridge connecting Pasir Laba Camp to the SAFTI Military Institute.

The SAFTI Military Institute was originally intended to be open to the general public, similar to the United States Naval Academy. Prior to the September 11 attacks in 2001, civilians did not require passes or security checks to enter the campus; only the offices and living quarters had restricted access. Since then, however, SAFTI has aligned with all other military bases in Singapore to enforce strict access controls. These measures include mandatory security screenings for all visitors, a ban on camera phones in designated Red Zones and a strict prohibition against unauthorised photography and filming anywhere on campus.

== Architecture ==
There is much symbolism in the SAFTI Military Institute campus, which sits on a hill. The Officer Cadet School was described by its architect as being shaped like a cradle, from which officers are born. Besides, the locations of the schools within the campus symbolise the stages of an officer's career. The Officer Cadet School is on the lower reaches of the hill, the SAF Advanced Schools are located midway along the hill, while the Goh Keng Swee Command and Staff College is at the top.

A prominent feature is the Tower, approximately 60 m (197 ft) tall and visible from many parts of western Singapore. It has three sides with a stairway connecting within, representing the four branches of the SAF. It is served by a lift and a 265-step stairway which symbolically represents the number of days a cadet takes to become an officer.

The parade square measures 120 m (394 ft) by 170 m (558 ft) and the viewing stands can accommodate up to 5,000 people.

== Organisation ==
The SAFTI Military Institute is headed by a Commandant, who usually holds the rank of Brigadier-General or Rear-Admiral. The institute has five schools: the Goh Keng Swee Command and Staff College, four SAF Advanced Schools for the Army, Navy, Digital and Intelligence Service and Air Force, and the Officer Cadet School (OCS).

=== Goh Keng Swee Command and Staff College ===
The Goh Keng Swee Command and Staff College (GKSCSC), formerly known as the Singapore Command and Staff College (SCSC), conducts the 41-week Command and Staff Course for regular officers and the 32-week National Service Command and Staff Course for reservist officers who have demonstrated potential for senior appointments. Every year, officers from other countries are invited to attend the Command and Staff Course. As of October 2009, 170 officers from 24 countries had completed the course alongside officers from the Singapore Armed Forces.

The college started conducting its first Command and Staff Course in 1969 and was officially opened in February 1970 by Prime Minister Lee Kuan Yew at Fort Canning. It was relocated to Marina Hill in the 1970s and Seletar Camp in the 1980s before it moved to its current location within the SAFTI Military Institute in 1995. In 2011, it was renamed after Goh Keng Swee, Singapore's first Minister for Defence.

=== SAF Advanced Schools ===
The four SAF Advanced Schools (SAS)—Army Officers' Advanced School (AOAS), Naval Officers' Advanced School (NAS), Digital and Intelligence Officers’ Advanced School (DIAS) and Air Force Officers' Advanced School (AFAS)—conduct advanced courses for officers and military experts from all three branches of the Singapore Armed Forces (SAF). They started in September 1968 when the Ministry of Defence set up the School of Advanced Training for Officers (SATO) after the first batch of officer cadets at SAFTI were commissioned. SAFTI's first commandant, Brigadier-General Kirpa Ram Vij, was among the first trainees at SATO. SATO was later renamed Army Officers' Advanced School and the schools for the Navy and Air Force were subsequently established. Courses conducted by the SAF Advanced Schools include the Company Tactics Course, Advanced Infantry Officers' Course, and Battalion Tactics Course.

=== Officer Cadet School ===
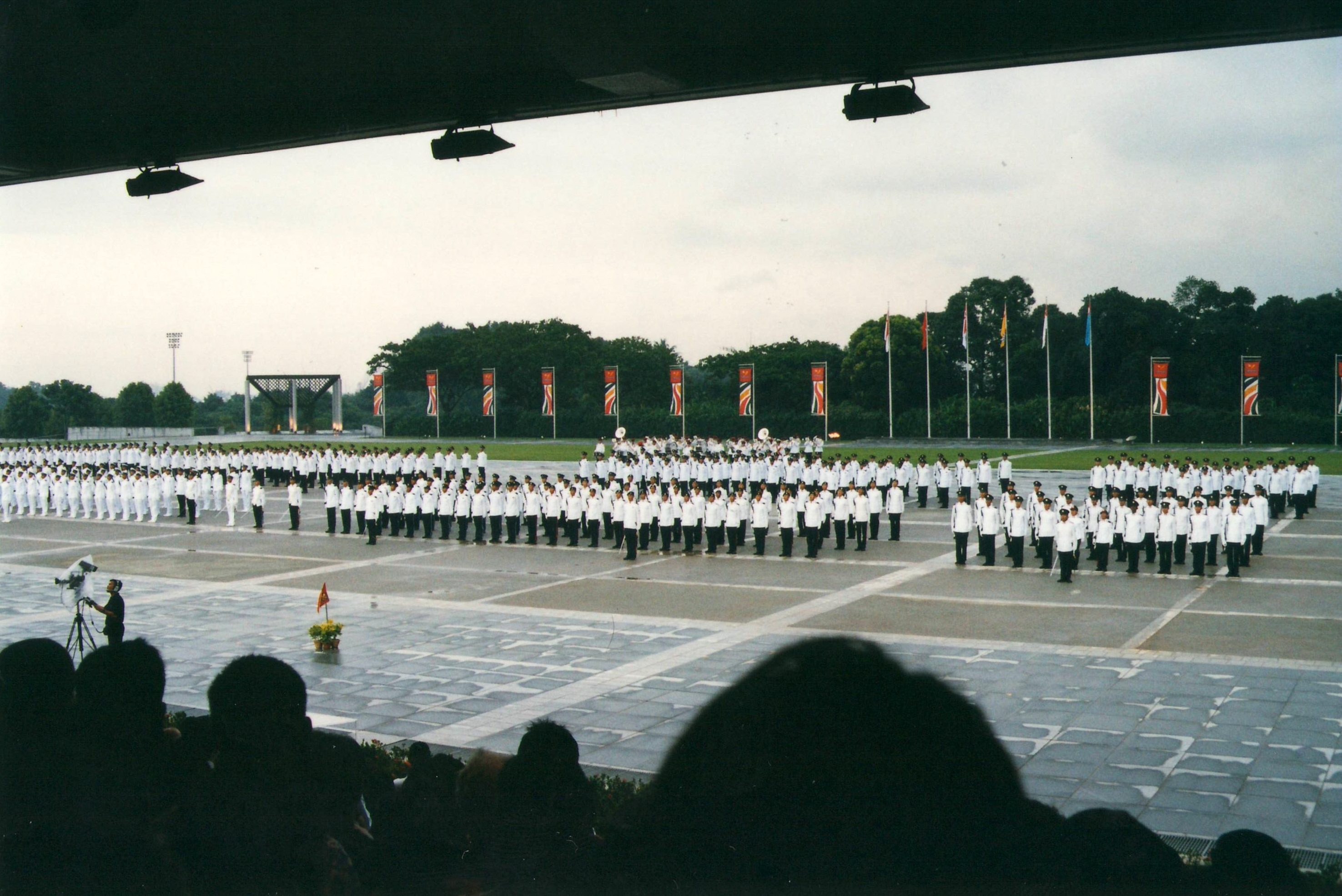
A commissioning parade at the SAFTI Military Institute

The Officer Cadet School (OCS) is where officer cadets are trained to serve as commissioned officers in the Singapore Armed Forces (SAF). The cadets are drawn from the best performing recruits in each Basic Military Training (BMT) cohort. Trainees with outstanding performance from the Specialist Cadet School (SCS), where specialists (non-commissioned officers) are trained, are also invited to transfer to OCS. Career soldiers may also attend OCS on application, recommendation and selection.

=== SAFTI Services Centre ===
The SAFTI Services Centre, previously known as Service Support Unit, provides support services such as security, medical, dental, physiotherapy, transport, estate, signal and logistics for all units within the campus.

== Facilities ==
The SAFTI Military Institute has extensive sporting and recreation facilities, including a stadium with a football pitch and running track, an Olympic-sized swimming pool with a diving tower, and an indoor rock-climbing wall. It also has a library which is open only to military personnel as of September 2019.

=== SAFTI Link Bridge ===
The SAFTI Link Bridge is the first cable-stayed bridge in Singapore, spanning 100 m (328 ft) across the Pan Island Expressway (PIE) and connecting the SAFTI Military Institute to Pasir Laba Camp.
