= Specialist (Singapore) =

In the Singapore Armed Forces (SAF), specialists are the group of ranks equivalent to non-commissioned officers in other armed forces. The term was introduced in 1993, for a more "positive" rank classification and shorter waiting time for Warrant Officers and Specialists (WOSPEC) career rank advancements. In the SAF, warrant officers are not considered specialists.

Like many other modern militaries, specialists form the backbone of the military. Specialists serve as the supervisor for the training and discipline of enlisted men and women, as well as the supervisor in the use of weapons and equipment, drill and ceremonies.

The following ranks are specialist ranks:

- Specialist cadet (SCT)
- Third sergeant (3SG)
- Second sergeant (2SG)
- First sergeant (1SG)
- Staff sergeant (SSG)
- Master sergeant (MSG)

Senior specialists may be promoted to warrant officer ranks, through the Joint Warrant Officers Course at the SAFWOS Leadership School. Under the new scheme, they will need to first go through the rank of third warrant officer, which is usually attained just before or after they go through the warfighter course from the Specialist and Warrant Officer Advanced School.

With the SAFWOS Leadership School, Specialist and Warrant Officer Advanced School and Specialist Cadet School, Pasir Laba Camp, site of the former Singapore Armed Forces Training Institute (SAFTI) is the new home of the warrant officer and specialist corps of the SAF.

Specialist ranks of the Singapore Armed Forces
Insignia					
Rank	Third sergeant	Second sergeant	First sergeant	Staff sergeant	Master sergeant
Abbreviation	3SG	2SG	1SG	SSG	MSG

== Singapore Civil Defence Force ==
The Singapore Civil Defence Force (SCDF) also trains specialist cadets, although it is not under the Ministry of Defence like the SAF but a uniformed service in the Home Team umbrella organisation under the Ministry of Home Affairs. SCDF cadets make up the Section Commander Course for both Fire & Rescue as well as Paramedic administered by the Civil Defence Academy's Command & Staff Training Wing. Essentially, specialists from both the Fire & Rescue as well as Emergency Medical career tracks form the backbone of the command operations of the Singapore Civil Defence Force particularly at the station level, filling the position of junior officers. Dependant on their education level, Specialist Cadets may graduate as Sergeant 1 or 2. Non-frontline vocationalists undergo a Vocational Section Commander Course and may be promoted to Sergeant 1. Sergeant 3 rank holders may eventually be selected to undergo a warrant officer course and become a warrant officer in the force.

The disaster and rescue team specialist is skilled in urban search and rescue, prolonged fire fighting operations, height and confined space operations, road traffic and industrial accidents and water rescue. On the other hand, the Hazmat specialist specialises in detection and containment of hazardous chemicals and toxins while the paramedic specialist is part of the emergency ambulance service team providing efficient and accurate pre-hospital care to accident victims and patients in critical condition.

== See also ==
- Singapore Armed Forces ranks
- Comparative military ranks
