= United States Army rank insignia =

See:

- United States Army enlisted rank insignia
  - United States Army enlisted rank insignia of World War I
  - United States Army enlisted rank insignia of World War II
- United States Military warrant officer rank insignia
- United States Army officer rank insignia
