= Sergeant first class =

Non-commissioned officer military rank

Sergeant First Class (SFC) is typically a senior non-commissioned officer rank, used in many countries.

== United States ==
Sergeant first class
- Sergeant first class insignia
- Country: United States
- Service branch: United States Army
- Abbreviation: SFC
- Rank group: Non-commissioned officer
- NATO rank code: OR-7
- Pay grade: E-7
- Formation: 1948
- Next higher rank: Master sergeant
- Next lower rank: Staff sergeant
- Equivalent ranks: Gunnery sergeant (USMC); Chief petty officer (USN & USCG); Master sergeant (USAF & USSF)

Related articles
- History: Technical sergeant

Sergeant First Class (SFC) is the seventh enlisted rank (E-7) in the U.S. Army, ranking above staff sergeant (E-6) and below master sergeant and first sergeant (E-8), and is the first non-commissioned officer rank designated as a senior non-commissioned officer (SNCO).

A sergeant first class is typically assigned as a platoon sergeant at the company level or battalion operations non-commissioned officer in charge at the battalion level, but may also hold other positions depending on the type of unit. In a combat arms role, a sergeant first class is typically second in charge (under an officer, typically a second lieutenant, serving as the platoon leader) of from 14 soldiers and four tanks in an armor platoon to 36 soldiers and four squads in a rifle platoon. A sergeant first class's primary responsibilities are tactical logistics, tactical casualty evacuations, and serving as the senior tactical adviser to the platoon leader. Sergeant first class replaced the rank of technical sergeant in 1948. (However, the U.S. Air Force, which separated from the Army in 1947, retained the rank of technical sergeant, and the U.S. Marine Corps had the rank of technical sergeant until 1959.) Sergeants first class are selected by a centralized promotion system.

The rank title of sergeant first class (SFC) existed in the Army from 1890 until 1920 when it was eliminated in an army-wide simplification of enlisted ranks which had grown into a system containing 128 different rank insignia. The rank of SFC was used in several technical branches such as the Army Medical Department and in the Ordnance, Signal, and Quartermaster Corps and was equivalent to the field service ranks at the company/battery/troop "staff" NCO level, such as color sergeant, supply sergeant, or radio sergeant. The Army restored the rank of SFC in 1948 when it replaced technical sergeant.

== Gallery ==
Водник 1 класа
Vodnik 1 klasa
(North Macedonian Ground Forces)

ސާރޖަންޓް ފަސްޓް ކްލާސް
Saarjant fast klaas
(Maldives National Defence Force)

Vodnik 1 klase
(Montenegrin Ground Army)

Sergeant der eerste klasse
(Royal Netherlands Army)

Sersjant 1. klasse
(Norwegian Army)

Sergeant first class
(United States Army)

== See also ==
- Military rank
- Sergeant
- Comparative military ranks
- United States Army enlisted rank insignia of World War I
- United States Army enlisted rank insignia of World War II
- U.S. Army enlisted rank insignia
- United States military pay
