= United States Army enlisted rank insignia of World War I =

The United States Army's enlisted rank insignia that was used during World War I differs from the current system. The color scheme used for the insignia's chevron was olive drab for field use uniforms or one of several colors depending on the corps on dress uniforms. The chevron system used by enlisted men during World War I came into being on July 17, 1902, and was changed to a different system in 1919. Specification 760, which was dated May 31, 1905, contained 45 different enlisted insignia that varied designs and titles by different corps of the Army. General Order Number 169, which was enacted on August 14, 1907, created an even larger variety of enlisted rank insignia. Pay grades similar to the current system were not yet in use by the U.S. Army, and instead, the pay system reflected the job assignment of the soldier rather than their rank. By the end of World War I, the system contained 128 different insignia designs.

== Examples of pre war dress insignia ==
										No insignia
Regimental sergeant major Infantry	Hospital Sergeant Medical Department	Battalion Sergeant Major Army Service School Detachment	Sergeant First Class Corps of Engineers	Ordnance Sergeant	First Sergeant Infantry	Sergeant Quartermaster Corps	Sergeant Signal Corps	Sergeant Cavalry	CorporalArtillery	Private

== Rank insignia used during the war ==
The ranks used by the army during the war (1917-1918), by branch, were:

=== Cavalry ===
Regimental Sergeant Major	Band Leader Until December 1917	Band Leader December 1917 to May 1918	Band Leader After May 1918	Supply Sergeant, regimental	Squadron Sergeant Major
First Sergeant	First Sergeant (Drum Major)	Assistant Band Leader until December 1917	Assistant Band Leader December 1917 to May 1918	Assistant Band Leader After May 1918	Sergeant Bugler Until December 1917
Sergeant Bugler December 1917 to May 1918	Sergeant Bugler After May 1918	Color Sergeant	Sergeant	Supply Sergeant Until May 1918	Supply Sergeant after May 1918
Mess Sergeant Until May 1918	Mess Sergeant After May 1918	Stable Sergeant until May 1918	Stable Sergeant After May 1918	Band Sergeant Until December 1917	Band Sergeant After December 1917
Corporal	Corporal Bugler After July 1918	Band Corporal Until December 1917	Band Corporal After December 1917	Cook	Horseshoer
			No Insignia	No Insignia	No Insignia
Saddler	Wagoner	Mechanic	Musician First Class Until December 29, 1917	Musician Second Class Until December 29, 1917	Musician Third Class Until December 29, 1917
Musician First Class After December 29, 1917	Musician Second Class After December 29, 1917	Musician Third Class After December 29, 1917	Bugler First Class After July 1918	Bugler After December 1917	Private First Class
No Insignia
Private

=== Infantry ===
Regimental Sergeant Major	Band Leader Until December 1917	Band Leader December 1917 to May 1918	Band Leader After May 1918	Supply Sergeant, regimental	Battalion Sergeant Major
First Sergeant	First Sergeant (Drum Major)	Assistant Band Leader until December 1917	Assistant Band Leader December 1917 to May 1918	Assistant Band Leader After May 1918	Sergeant Bugler Until December 1917
Sergeant Bugler December 1917 to May 1918	Sergeant Bugler After May 1918	Color Sergeant	Sergeant	Supply Sergeant Until May 1918	Supply Sergeant after May 1918
Mess Sergeant Until May 1918	Mess Sergeant After May 1918	Stable Sergeant until May 1918	Stable Sergeant After May 1918	Band Sergeant Until December 1917	Band Sergeant After December 1917
Corporal	Corporal Bugler After July 1918	Band Corporal Until December 1917	Band Corporal After December 1917	Cook	Saddler
	No Insignia	No Insignia	No Insignia		
Wagoner	Musician First Class Until December 29, 1917	Musician Second Class Until December 29, 1917	Musician Third Class Until December 29, 1917	Musician First Class After December 29, 1917	Musician Second Class After December 29, 1917
				No Insignia	
Musician Third Class December 29, 1917 1918	Bugler First Class After July 1918	Bugler After December 1917	Private First Class	Private	

=== Coast Artillery Corps ===
Sergeant Major Senior Grade	Master Electrician	Band Leader Until December 1917	Band Leader December 1917 to May 1918	Band Leader After May 1918	Engineer
Supply Sergeant, Regimental	Sergeant Major JuniorGrade	First Sergeant	Electrician Sergeant First Class Until May 1918	Electrician Sergeant First Class After May 1918	Assistant Engineer
Master Gunner	Assistant Band Leader until December 1917	Assistant Band Leader December 1917 to May 1918	Assistant Band Leader After May 1918	Sergeant Bugler Until December 1917	Sergeant Bugler December 1917 to May 1918
	No Insignia	No Insignia			
Sergeant Bugler After May 1918	Oiler, Mine Planter Service After July 1918	Steward, Mine Planter Service After July 1918	Electrician Sergeant Second Class Until May 1918	Electrician Sergeant Second Class After May 1918	Radio Sergeant Until May 1918
Radio Sergeant After May 1918	Sergeant	Supply Sergeant Until May 1918	Supply Sergeant after May 1918	Mess Sergeant Until May 1918	Mess Sergeant After May 1918
Band Sergeant Until December 1917	Band Sergeant After December 1917	Fireman Until December 1917	Fireman After December 1917	Corporal	Corporal Bugler After July 1918
				No Insignia	No Insignia
Band Corporal Until December 1917	Band Corporal After December 1917	Cook	Mechanic	Assistant Steward Mine Planter Service After July 1918	Musician First Class Until December 29, 1917
No Insignia	No Insignia				
Musician Second Class Until December 29, 1917	Musician Third Class Until December 29, 1917	Musician First Class After December 29, 1917	Musician Second Class After December 29, 1917	Musician Third Class After December 29, 1917	Bugler First Class After July 1918
	No Insignia		No Insignia		
Bugler After December 1917	Deckhand Mine Planter Service After July 1918	Private First Class	Private		

=== Field Artillery ===
Regimental Sergeant Major	Band Leader Until December 1917	Band Leader December 1917 to May 1918	Band Leader After May 1918	Supply Sergeant, regimental	Battalion Sergeant Major
First Sergeant	First Sergeant (Drum Major)	Assistant Band Leader until December 1917	Assistant Band Leader December 1917 to May 1918	Assistant Band Leader After May 1918	Sergeant Bugler Until December 1917
Sergeant Bugler December 1917 to May 1918	Sergeant Bugler After May 1918	Color Sergeant	Sergeant	Supply Sergeant Until May 1918	Supply Sergeant after May 1918
Mess Sergeant Until May 1918	Mess Sergeant After May 1918	Band Sergeant Until December 1917	Band Sergeant After December 1917	Corporal	Corporal Bugler After July 1918
Band Corporal Until December 1917	Band Corporal After December 1917	Cook	Horseshoer	Saddler	Wagoner
			No Insignia	No Insignia	No Insignia
Chief Mechanic Until May 1918	Chief Mechanic After May 1918	Mechanic	Musician First Class Until December 29, 1917	Musician Second Class Until December 29, 1917	Musician Third Class Until December 29, 1917
Musician First Class After December 29, 1917	Musician Second Class AfterDecember 29, 1917	Musician Third Class After December 29, 1917	Bugler First Class After July 1918	Bugler After December 1917	Private First Class
No Insignia
Private

=== Signal Corps ===
Aviator Until creation of the Air Service in July 1918	Master Signal Electrician Until May 1918	Master Signal Electrician After May 1918	Sergeant First Class Until May 1918	Sergeant First Class After May 1918	Chauffeur First Class (Rank Created July 24, 1917)
Sergeant Until May 1918	Sergeant After May 1918	Chauffeur (Rank Created July 24, 1917)	Corporal Until May 1918	Corporal After May 1918	Cook
		No Insignia			
Horseshoer	Private First Class	Private			

=== Corps of Engineers ===
Regimental Sergeant Major	Master Engineer Senior Grade	Band Leader Until December 1917	Band Leader From December 1916 to May 1918	Band Leader After May 1918	Master Engineer Junior Grade
Supply Sergeant, regimental	Battalion Sergeant Major	Supply Sergeant, Battalion	First Sergeant	Sergeant First Class Until May 1918	Sergeant First Class After May 1918
Assistant Band Leader Until December 1917	Assistant Band Leader From December 1916 to May 1918	Assistant Band Leader After May 1918	Sergeant Bugler Until December 1917	Sergeant Bugler From December 1916 to May 1918	Sergeant Bugler After May 1918
Color Sergeant	Sergeant	Supply Sergeant Until May 1918	Supply Sergeant After May 1918	Mess Sergeant Until May 1918	Mess Sergeant After May 1918
Stable Sergeant Until May 1918	Stable Sergeant After May 1918	Band Sergeant Until December 1917	Band Sergeant After December 1917	Corporal	Corporal Bugler After July 1918
Band Corporal Until December 1917	Band Corporal After December 1917	Cook	Horseshoer	Saddler	Wagoner
No Insignia	No Insignia	No Insignia			
Musician First Class Until December 29, 1917	Musician Second Class Until December 29, 1917	Musician Third Class Until December 29, 1917	Musician First Class After December 29, 1917	Musician Second Class After December 29, 1917	Musician Third Class After December 29, 1917
			No Insignia		
Bugler First Class After July 1918	Bugler	Private First Class	Private		

=== Medical Department ===
Master Hospital Sergeant	Hospital Sergeant Until May 1918	Hospital Sergeant After May 1918	Sergeant First Class Until May 1918	Sergeant First Class After May 1918	Sergeant Until May 1918
Sergeant After May 1918	Corporal Until May 1918	Corporal After May 1918	Cook	Farrier	Horseshoer
			No Insignia		
Saddler	Mechanic	Private First Class	Private		

=== Ordnance Department ===
Ordnance Sergeant Until October 1917	Ordnance Sergeant From October 1917 to May 1918	Ordnance Sergeant After May 1918	Sergeant First Class August 1917 to May 1918	Sergeant First Class After May 1918	Sergeant Until May 1918	Sergeant After May 1918	Corporal Until May 1918
		No Insignia					
Corporal After May 1918	Private First Class	Private Second Class					

=== Quartermaster Corps ===
Quartermaster Sergeant, Senior Grade	Quartermaster Sergeant, Quartermaster Corps Until May 1918	Quartermaster Sergeant, Quartermaster Corps After May 1918	Sergeant First Class Until May 1918	Sergeant First Class Until After 1918	Sergeant Until May 1918
					No Insignia
Sergeant After May 1918	Corporal Until May 1918	Corporal After May 1918	Cook	Private First Class	Private

=== Air Service (Created May 24, 1918) ===
Aviator	Master Signal Electrician	Sergeant First Class	Chauffeur First Class	Sergeant	Chauffeur
					No Insignia
Corporal	Cook	Horseshoer	Assistant Chauffeur	Private First Class	Private

=== Gas Service Created on July 5, 1917 then changed to Chemical Warfare Service on June 28, 1918 ===
The organization of the Gas/Chemical Warfare service is based on a table in a report by the director of the service, Major General William Sibert to the Adjutant General of the Army, Dated September 26, 1918. One column of the table does show the service’s organization as of October 30, 1918, despite the date of the report.

The complex enlisted organization starting in July 1918 is confirmed by War Department General Order 62, dated June 28, 1918, that states “The rank, pay, and allowances of the enlisted men of the Chemical Warfare Service, National Army, shall be the same as now authorized for the corresponding grades in the Corps of Engineers.”

Insignia for the service was prescribed by Change No. 3 to Special Regulation 42 on February 19, 1918. Prior to that engineer insignia was probably used.

Master Engineer Senior Grade After July 1918	Master Engineer Junior Grade After July 1918	Regimental Sergeant Major After July 1918	Regimental Supply Sergeant After July 1918	Battalion Sergeant Major After July 1918	Battalion Supply Sergeant After July 1918
First Sergeant After April 1918	Sergeant First Class Until May 1918	Sergeant First Class Until After May 1918	Mess Sergeant After July 1918	Supply Sergeant after July 1918	Stable Sergeant After October 1918
Sergeant Until May 1918	Sergeant After May 1918	Corporal Until May 1918	Corporal After May 1918	Bugler After July 1918	Cook After July 1918
					No Insignia
Mechanic After July 1918	Wagoner After July 1918	Horseshoer After October 1918	Saddler After October 1918	Private First Class	Private

=== Tank Corps (Created in late 1917) ===
Master Engineer Senior Grade February to May 1918	Master Engineer Senior Grade After May 1918	Master Engineer Senior Grade After May 1918 Alternate Version	Sergeant First Class	Sergeant	Corporal
		No Insignia			
Private First Class February to May 1918	Private First ClassAfter May 1918	Private			

=== Motor Transport Corps (Created August 15, 1918) ===
Master Engineer Senior Grade After September 1918	First Sergeant	Sergeant First Class	Sergeant	Corporal	Cook
	No Insignia				
Private First Class After September 1918	Private				

=== Judge Advocate General’s Department (Enlisted Men Added July 12, 1918) ===
Regimental Sergeant Major	Battalion Sergeant Major	Sergeant	Corporal

=== Corps of Intelligence Police created August 13, 1917 ===
As far as can be determined, the only enlisted men in the Corps of Intelligence Police were sergeants.

Sergeant Until May 1918	Sergeant After May 1918

=== Corps of Interpreters Created July 14, 1917 ===
As far as can be determined the only enlisted men in the Corps of Interpreters were sergeants

Sergeant Until May 1918	Sergeant After May 1918

=== U.S. Military Academy Detachment ===
Band Sergeant and Assistant Leader Until May 1918	Band Sergeant and Assistant Leader After May 1918	First Sergeant	Field music Sergeant Until May 1918	Field music Sergeant After May 1918	Sergeant
		No Insignia	No Insignia	No Insignia	
Corporal	Cook	Musician First Class Until May 1918	Musician Second Class Until May 1918	Musician Third Class Until May 1918	Musician First Class After May 1918
			No Insignia	No Insignia	
Musician Second Class After May 1918	Musician Third Class After May 1918	Private First Class After June 27, 1918	Private Second Class After June 27, 1918	Private	

=== Service School Detachments ===
- Regimental Sergeant Major
- Sergeant Major Senior Grade
- Master Electrician
- Master signal Electrician
- Engineer
- Quartermaster Sergeant, Quartermaster Corps
- Supply Sergeant, regimental
- Battalion Sergeant Major
- Sergeant Major Junior Grade
- First Sergeant
- Sergeant First Class
- Electrician Sergeant First Class
- Master Gunner
- Electrician Sergeant Second Class
- Sergeant
- Supply Sergeant
- Stable Sergeant
- Fireman
- Corporal
- Corporal Bugler (created on July 9, 1918)
- Cook
- Horseshoer
- Saddler
- Wagoner
- Chief Mechanic
- Mechanic
- Bugler First Class (created on July 9, 1918)
- Bugler
- Private First Class
- Private

Service school detachments wore the same insignia as other branches with privates first class using the same insignia as privates first class at West Point.

=== Other rank insignia ===
In 1918 the army added insignia for privates first class serving at army of corps headquarters and with the general recruiting service.

Private First Class General Headquarters	Private First Class General Recruiting Service

Change number 4 to Special Regulation 42 dated May 7, 1918, prescribes insignia for the rank of motor sergeant. It, along with the insignia for chauffeurs is listed under general application for all branches. An article in the Army and Navy Register from July 4, 1918 states that the rank of motor sergeant had been created under authority granted to the president to reorganize the army as needed during the war. The article goes on the state that there was a law before congress that would create the rank of motor sergeant in all branches and expand the chauffeur ranks also to all branches. This law did not pass.

Various general orders from the American Expeditionary Force do show chauffeurs in various organizations, but as a rank, only in the Signal Corps. However the title of motor sergeant is never mentioned. Nor is it used in army order from the War Department itself. Assistant chauffeurs are listed on tables of organization as privates with duty as chauffeurs in division trains and various organizations in the Coast Artillery Corps.

Motor Sergeant	Assistant Chauffeur

== Order of Precedence ==
Article III, paragraph 9 of the Regulations for Army of the United States 1913, Corrected to April 15, 1917, gives the order of precedence for officers and noncommissioned officers as:

- 1. Lieutenant General
- 2. Major General
- 3. Brigadier General
- 4. Colonel
- 5. Lieutenant Colonel
- 6. Major
- 7. Captain
- 8. First Lieutenant
- 9. Second Lieutenant
- 10. Aviator, Signal Corps
- 11. Cadet
- 12. (a) Sergeant Major, Regimental

- Sergeant Major, Senior Grade, Coast Artillery Corps

- 12.(b) Quartermaster Sergeant, Senior Grade, Quartermaster Corps

- Master Hospital Sergeant, Medical Department
- Master Engineer Senior Grade, Corps of Engineers
- Master Electrician, Coast Artillery Corps
- Master Signal Electrician
- Band Leader

- 12.(c) Hospital Sergeant, Medical Department

- Master Engineer Junior Grade, Corps of Engineers
- Engineer, Coast Artillery Corps

- 13.Ordnance Sergeant

- Quartermaster Sergeant, Quartermaster Corps
- Supply Sergeant Regimental

- 14. Sergeant Major, Squadron and Battalion

- Sergeant Major Junior Grade, Coast Artillery Corps
- Supply Sergeant, Battalion, Corps of Engineers

- 15.(a) First Sergeant
- 15.(b) Sergeant First Class, Medical Department

- Sergeant First Class, Quartermaster Corps
- Sergeant First Class, Corps of Engineers
- Sergeant First Class, Signal Corps
- Electrician Sergeant First Class, Coast Artillery Corps
- Electrician Sergeant, Artillery Detachment, United States Military Academy
- Assistant Engineer, Coast Artillery Corps
- Master Gunner, Coast Artillery Corps
- Master Gunner, Artillery Detachment, United States Military Academy
- Band Sergeant and Assistant Leader, United States Military Academy Band
- Assistant Band Leader
- Sergeant Bugler
- Electrician Sergeant Second Class, Coast Artillery Corps
- Electrician Sergeant Second Class, Artillery Detachment, United States Military Academy
- Radio Sergeant

- 16.Color Sergeant
- 17.Sergeant

- Supply Sergeant Company
- Mess Sergeant
- Stable Sergeant
- Fireman, Coast Artillery Corps

- 18. Corporal

== See also ==
- Comparative officer ranks of World War II
- United States Army enlisted rank insignia
- United States Army enlisted rank insignia of World War II
- United States Army officer rank insignia
- United States Army uniforms in World War II
