= United States Army enlisted rank insignia =

This chart shows the enlisted rank insignia of the United States Army, with seniority and pay grade, increasing from right to left. The enlisted ranks of corporal (E-4) and higher are considered non-commissioned officers (NCOs). The rank of specialist is also in pay grade E-4, but does not hold non-commissioned officer status; it is common for a soldier to never hold the rank of corporal, and instead be promoted from specialist to sergeant, attaining junior NCO status at that time.

US DoD pay grade	E-9 Special (Note: SEAC, SMA, and SEA all have E-9 pay grades but are given unique pay.)			E-9		E-8		E-7	E-6	E-5	E-4		E-3	E-2	E-1
NATO code	OR-9					OR-8		OR-7	OR-6	OR-5	OR-4		OR-3	OR-2	OR-1
Army Green Service Uniform															No insignia
Army Blue Service Uniform															No insignia
Title	Senior enlisted advisor to the chairman	Sergeant major of the Army	Senior enlisted advisor to the chief of the National Guard Bureau	Command sergeant major	Sergeant major	First sergeant	Master sergeant	Sergeant first class	Staff sergeant	Sergeant	Corporal	Specialist	Private first class	Private	Private
Abbreviation	SEAC	SMA	SEA	CSM	SGM	1SG (Note: First sergeant is considered a temporary and lateral rank and is senior to master sergeant. A first sergeant can revert to master sergeant upon leaving assignment.)	MSG	SFC	SSG	SGT	CPL	SPC (Note: SP4 is sometimes encountered as an abbreviation for specialist instead of SPC. This is a holdover from when there were additional specialist ranks at pay grades E-5 to E-7.)	PFC	PV2 (Note: PVT is also used as an abbreviation for both private ranks when pay grade need not be distinguished.)	PV1

U.S. Army enlisted rank was originally indicated by colored epaulets. The use of chevrons began in 1821, with the orientation changing over time from point-down to point-up and then back to point down again during the American Civil War. Around the turn of the 20th century, point-up wear of chevrons returned and has remained.

== History ==
=== 1775–1821: epaulets ===
From the creation of the United States Army to 1821, non-commissioned officer (NCO) and staff non-commissioned officer (SNCO) ranks was distinguished by the wearing of usually worsted epaulets.

From 1775 until 1779, sergeants and corporals wore one epaulet on the right shoulder, corporals wore green epaulets, and sergeants wore red epaulets.

In 1779, staff sergeants (or senior NCOs) were authorized to wear two silk epaulets for cavalry NCO never came in wide use while the wearing of white epaulettes prevailed.

By 1783/84, the Continental Army was discharged. For a few weeks, only 55 artillerymen at West Point and 25 men at Fort Pitt were to remain. In August 1784, the 700 men strong First American Regiment (including two companies of artillery) was organized as a temporary replacement for the Continental Army. In October 1786, with the approval of Congress, this force was to be expanded into a Legionary Corps of additional infantry, rifle troops, artillery, and dragoons. But this project never materialized. In 1791, the Second Regiment of Infantry was raised and organized as the First Regiment. The two regiments were consolidated into the Legion of the United States in 1792 including artillery and dragoons (the first federal mounted force since the discharge of the Continental Light Dragoons in 1783), that then transformed into the US Army in 1796.

Uniform regulations dated January 30, 1787 prescribed, SNCOs wore two silver silk epaulets, sergeants two worsted and corporals one worsted. In the same year, the epaulets' color of cavalry NCOs officially changed from blue to white. At that time the federal mounted force of two troops of dragoons existed only on paper and never got beyond the planning stage (see above).

In 1799, red worsted epaulets were prescribed for all NCOs in all branches: SNCOs on both shoulders, sergeants on the right shoulder, corporals on the left. Chief musicians were identified by two white epaulets. Shortly after, in the year 1800, the color of the epaulets was changed to yellow, for chief musicians in to blue. In reality, the artillery NCOs ignored the order of 1799 and maintained their yellow epaulets, as did a company of bombardiers, sappers, and miners recruited during the War of 1812. In 1802 the infantry NCOs switched back to their former white epaulets. By 1808 dragoons were wearing white and riflemen yellow. SNCOs probably wore two worsted epaulettes with crescent, sergeants two plain worsted epaulettes, and corporals wore one epaulette on the right shoulder. Sergeants were given two epaulets once again in 1812.

=== 1821–1832: chevrons and "wings" vs. epaulettes ===
From 1821 to 1832, enlisted personnel wore dark blue "wings" trimmed in yellow (infantry, in white) on each shoulder and a horizontal row of four yellow (infantry, white) buttons on each cuff. This precluded the use of epaulets. Rank was shown by a single, point up, chevron. Sergeants major and quartermaster sergeants wore the chevron on both upper sleeves, principal musicians and sergeants on both lower sleeves and corporals on the right upper sleeve. The chevrons were yellow for artillery and white for infantry. The regulations prescribe black chevrons for riflemen but that regiment had been abolished.

In 1825 this system was changed. Sergeants major, quartermaster sergeants and principal musicians now wore a chevron and an arc on both upper sleeves, sergeant a chevron on both upper sleeves and corporals a chevron on both lower sleeves.

=== 1832–1851: epaulettes and slash flaps ===
The above system was superseded in 1832. At that time, enlisted personnel wore a pair of yellow (infantry, white) cloth epaulets with 2 1/2" long and 1/2" in diameter gold (possibly silver for infantry) fringe for senior NCOs, 1/4” diameter worsted fringe for sergeants and 1/8’ inch worsted fringe for corporals (privates wore very short fringe). Senior NCOs wore a coat with two rows of ten buttons that ended 3 1/2" above the knees, while all other enlisted personnel had single-breasted coats with nine buttons that ended 7" above the knees. Senior NCOs would have worn a crimson colored sash and a yellow or white aiguillette.

In addition, there were on the cuffs a slash flap with yellow (infantry, white) lace and a vertical row of several golds (infantry, silver) buttons depending on grade: senior sergeants wore four flaps and buttons, sergeant wore three flaps and buttons, corporals and privates wore two flaps and buttons. A sergeant-major of artillery had a red plume on the dress hat and a sergeant major of infantry a white plume; quartermaster sergeants in both branches had a light blue plume. Principal or chief musicians were only in the infantry and wore a white plume. A first or orderly sergeant had no plume but wore the uniform of a sergeant with a red waist sash.

By 1834 the epaulets for senior NCOs were the same as those for lieutenants (gold for artillery or silver for infantry with 1/8” wide fringe). Unlike lieutenants the fringe was worsted in yellow for artillery and white for infantry.

When a regiment of dragoons was added in 1833, the prescribed uniforms had a simple pointed cuff and metal shoulder scales. Senior NCOs were distinguished by aiguillettes and yellow sashes. Sergeants wore three yellow point down chevrons on both upper sleeves and corporals two. The yellow sash was also worn by first sergeants.

By 1839 ordnance sergeants wore the uniform of an artillery sergeant major with no aiguillette and a dark blue trouser stripe.

In 1845, horse artillery companies were allowed dragoon-like uniforms with red chevrons.

=== Chevrons on fatigue jackets 1833–1847 ===
The use of the sergeant's and corporals's chevrons by dragoons beginning in 1833 is described in regulations as part of the description of the dress coat. This would seem to indicate that they were not worn on the fatigue jacket. However a price list from the era shows higher prices for sergeant's and corporal's jackets due to the addition of the chevrons. Therefore, it is probable that sergeants and corporals wore the chevrons on their fatigue jackets with first sergeants and senior NCOs being distinguished by their sashes.

This would have also applied to the Regiment of Mounted Riflemen created in 1846, especially since they were only allowed the fatigue jackets.

It is also possible, if not probable, that sergeants and corporals of other branches were wearing chevrons on their jackets prior to 1847.

=== Chevrons 1851–1902 ===
In 1851 the army implemented a major overhaul of its uniforms introducing colored chevrons for each branch. The 1851 colors were Saxony blue for infantry (changed to sky blue by 1857), red for artillery, yellow for engineers, orange for dragoons, green for mounted riflemen and crimson for ordnance.

Chevrons were worn point down.

In 1872 the construction of chevrons was changed to a single piece of colored cloth with the chevrons and arcs outlined in heavy black stitching. Engineers switched from yellow that they had shared with cavalry since 1858 to red with the stitching done in white. This began the concept of some branches having two colors.

In 1884 the chevrons on dress uniforms were changed to a single piece of colored cloth with the chevrons and arcs made of gold lace. Engineers added white stitching around the lace.

Chevrons were worn on coats, but were not worn on shirts. In fact shirts are barely mentioned in regulations. During the Spanish–American War in 1898 shirts were worn without coats due to the warm climates in which it was fought. The army allowed chevrons on shirts in July. The large coat chevrons did not fit on shirt sleeves so soldiers began to fashion smaller versions of their chevrons. The army gave preliminary approval of smaller chevrons in 1900. Full implementation was superseded by a change in uniforms in 1902.

=== Since 1902: chevrons point up ===
==== 1902–1920 ====
With the 1902 uniform change the smaller shirt sized chevrons were prescribed for all uniforms. They were to be worn point up. The chevrons were in the branch colors on a blue, white, khaki or olive drab background.

The branch colors in 1902 were,

- Cavalry: Yellow
- Artillery: Red
- Infantry: Light Blue
- Quartermaster’s Department (including USMA Detachment): Buff
- Substance Department: Grey
- Medical Department & Hospital Corps: Maroon and White
- Corps of Engineers: Red and White
- Ordnance Department: Black and red
- Signal Corps: Orange and White

There were 34 enlisted ranks to be shown in these nine colors, each on four different backgrounds. This was more than the army's supply system could handle. In 1904 the colored chevrons were restricted to the dress blue coat. On olive drab, khaki and white uniforms the chevrons would be made of olive drab shirting flannel on the appropriate colored background to match the coat.

Implementation of the new chevrons was slow. In 1905 the army ordered that any of the older larger chevrons still in use would also be worn point up.

According to Army Regulations of 1904 the ranks and grades were:

12. Regimental Sergeant Major, Sergeant Major Senior Grade, Master Electrician, Master Signal Electrician.

13. Ordnance Sergeant, Post Commissary Sergeant, Post Quartermaster Sergeant, Electrician Sergeant, Sergeant First Class of the Hospital Corps, Signal Sergeant First Class.

14. Regimental Quartermaster Sergeant, Regimental Commissary Sergeant, Chief Musician.

15. Squadron Sergeant Major, Battalion Sergeant Major, Sergeant Major Junior Grade, Color Sergeant, Chief Trumpeter, Principal Musician, Battalion Quartermaster Sergeant.

16. First Sergeant, Drum Major.

17. Sergeant, Troop Quartermaster Sergeant, Battery Quartermaster Sergeant, Company Quartermaster Sergeant, Stable Sergeant.

18. Corporal.

non-NCO Cook Trumpeter, Musician, Farrier and Blacksmith, Mechanic, Artificer, Saddler, Wagoner, Private First Class, Private.

The white coat was restricted to medical personnel in 1907, the khaki coat was abolished in 1911 and the blue coat was suspended in 1917. This left only the olive on olive chevrons that were used through World War I.

Wartime reorganization left the army with 55 enlisted ranks serving in 18 branches by 1918. Attempts were made to eliminate branch specific distinctions and the wear of chevrons was restricted to the right sleeve only in order to simplify supply needs.

After the war the army continued these reforms by changing the insignia for a private first class from the branch insignia to a single arc and eliminating the concept of the background of a chevron had to match the garment it was worn on.

In 1920 some color was added to certain chevrons and even a white navy petty officer's eagle was added to the insignia of master engineers and quartermaster sergeants. These new insignia were never issued due to a major change in enlisted ranks and insignia later in 1920.

==== 1920–1942 ====
The biggest change in the history of US Army enlisted ranks came on June 4, 1920. On that day congress passed a law that changed how enlisted ranks were managed. It created seven pay grades, numbered one to seven with one being the highest, and gave the president the authority to create whatever ranks were necessary within those grades. Prior to this, all enlisted ranks had been created by law. The laws usually laid out the size and shape of the army branch by branch, creating different ranks structures for each branch. This law ended branch specific ranks.

The law specified what percentage of the enlisted strength of the army were allowed in each of the seven grades. The first grade would contain .6% of the army's enlisted men, the second grade 1.8%, the third grade 2%, the fourth and fifth grades 9.5%, the sixth grade 25% and the remaining 51.6% in the seventh grade. Men in the sixth and seventh grades could be rated as specialists and get extra pay. This replaced the specialist ranks such as cooks or artificers. There were six classes of specialists in both grades. Specialists first class could only be .7% of the authorized strength of the sixth and seventh grades. Specialists second class were restricted to 1.4%, specialists third class 1.9%, specialists fourth class 4.7%, specialists fifth class 5% and specialists sixth class 15.2%.

The army implemented the new law on June 19, 1920. The new executive authority was used to reduce the large number of existing ranks to seven, plus the specialists.

- Grade One became the rank of Master Sergeant. It was created from the ranks of Regimental Sergeant Major. Sergeant Major Senior Grade, Quartermaster Sergeant Senior Grade, Master Hospital Sergeant, Master Engineer Senior Grade, Master Electrician, Master Signal Electrician, Engineer, Regimental Supply Sergeant, the senior 25% of Ordnance Sergeants, the senior 50% of Master Gunners and the Band Sergeants and Assistant Band Leader of the West Point Band.
- Grade Two became the rank of Technical Sergeant. It came from the ranks of Hospital Sergeant, Master Engineer Junior Grade, the junior 75% of Ordnance Sergeants, Electrician Sergeant First Class, Assistant Engineer, Quartermaster Sergeant and Electrician Sergeants from the Artillery School at West Point. Also in Grade Two the rank of First Sergeant was continued.
- Grade Three became the rank of Staff Sergeant. It came from the ranks of Squadron or Battalion Sergeant Major, Squadron or Battalion Supply Sergeant, Sergeant Major Junior Grade, Sergeant First Class, the junior 50% of Master Gunners, Assistant Band Leader except from the West Point Band, Sergeant Bugler, Electrician Sergeant, Radio Sergeant, Color Sergeant and Sergeant of Field Music from the West Point Band.
- The rank of Sergeant was placed in Grade Four. It absorbed the ranks of Band Sergeant, Stable Sergeant, Mess Sergeant and Supply Sergeant.
- The rank of Corporal was placed in Grade Five. It absorbed the ranks of Band Corporal and Corporal Bugler.
- The rank of Private First Class was placed in Grade Six, and the rank of Private was placed in grade seven. Within those two grades Musicians First Class in the West Point Band were rated as Specialists First Class. Oilers in the Mine Planter Service were rated as Specialists Second Class. Stewards and Firemen in the Mine Planter Service, Musicians Second Class in the West Point Band and all other Musicians First Class were rated as Specialists Third Class. Chief Mechanics, Horseshoers, Cooks, Musicians Third Class in the West Point Band and all other Musicians Second Class were rated as Specialists Fourth Class. Chauffeurs First Class, Chauffeurs, all other Musicians Third Class, Saddlers, Assistant Stewards and Deck Hands in the Mine Planter Service, Mechanics and Wagoners were rated as Specialists Fifth Class. Buglers First Class and Buglers were rated as Specialists Sixth Class. The ranks of Farrier and Aviator are not listed in the order.

The new ranks were shown by olive drab chevrons on a dark blue background. Master Sergeant's wore three chevrons and three arcs, Technical Sergeants three chevrons and two arcs, First Sergeants three chevrons two arcs and the traditional lozenge, Staff Sergeants three chevrons and one arc, Sergeants three chevrons, Corporals two and Privates First Class one. They were worn on the left sleeve until 1921 when they were placed on both sleeves.

Specialists were to wear the insignia of their grade, one chevron for Grade six or none for Grade Seven. Unofficially many specialists, at least in Grade Six wore one chevron with branch insignia in the angle and one to six arcs.

Khaki on dark blue chevrons were created in 1936 for use on khaki uniforms.

==== 1942–1948 ====
In 1942, there were several reforms. The pay was increased for all ranks for the first time in two decades, and combat pay was introduced. The rank of the first sergeant was moved to Grade One and the specialist ranks were abolished. The specialist ranks were replaced by the distinct ranks of technician third grade (equivalent to a staff sergeant), technician fourth grade (equivalent to a sergeant), and technician fifth grade (equivalent to a corporal). Technicians were inferior to non-commissioned officers of the same grade but superior to all grades below them. They had the same insignia as the regular rank of their grade, but with a cloth "T" inset below their stripes.

==== 1948–1956 ====
Chevrons of 1948
1st grade		2nd grade	3rd grade	4th grade	5th grade
First sergeant	Master sergeant	Technical sergeant	Sergeant	Corporal	Private first class
1st Sgt	M/Sgt	T/Sgt	Sgt	Cpl	Pfc

With the Career Compensation Act of October 12, 1949, the pay grades were broken up into seven "E" (enlisted and non-commissioned officer), four "W" (warrant officer), and eight "O" (officer) grades. The technician's ranks were abolished and were absorbed into their equivalent line ranks. The rank of private was divided into two ranks of private (Grade E1 and Grade E2), and private first class (Grade E3). Corporal was regraded as Grade E4. Sergeant (Grade E5) was a career soldier rank and its former three-chevron insignia was abolished and replaced with the three chevrons and an arc of the rank of staff sergeant. The rank of staff sergeant was discontinued and the rank of technical sergeant (Grade E6) was renamed sergeant first class. The ranks of first sergeant and master sergeant were placed in (Grade E7).

In 1948, the old olive on blue insignia was abolished. In their place was a new system of smaller (2 inches wide) and narrower chevrons and arcs that were instead differenced by color called the "Goldenlite" system - with subdued dark blue stripes on bright yellow backing for combat arms and yellow stripes on dark blue for support arms. They were not popular. Combat-arm NCOs found their stripes were hard to identify unless the viewer was very close, making it hard to rally and lead troops. Support-arm NCOs found their stripes too small to be easily seen at a distance, making it hard to tell their seniority at a glance. When the US Army entered the Korean War, it was found that troops in combat abandoned the new insignia. They either used the support arm stripes, purchased the old larger olive-on-blue stripes from post exchanges or Army / Navy stores, or used hand-cut or tailor-made copies. The small "Goldenlite" stripes were abandoned in February 1951 and the dark-blue-on-yellow insignia was abolished. Larger 3-inch-wide olive-drab-on-dark-blue stripes were adopted for servicemen.

In 1950, the Women's Army Corps (WAC) were issued new Goldenlite yellow-on-brown insignia for wear with the taupe WAC uniform. It was the same size as the men's small 2-inch-wide Goldenlite stripes. (Female personnel would wear the smaller 2-inch insignia until 1998, well after male personnel was issued larger, 3-inch-wide insignia in 1951.) In 1951, WACs were assigned surplus men's Goldenlite-yellow-on-dark-blue stripes for wear with olive drab or fatigue uniforms. Also in 1951, the optional white WAC dress uniform was now authorized for wear by enlisted and NCO ranks (Note: The white WAC uniform was originally issued in 1944 for tropical and hot weather wear by WAC officers.) and 2-inch Goldenlite yellow-on-white stripes were created to be worn with it.

In 1955 (as stated in Army Regulation 615–15, dated 2 July 1954), new grade structures were announced reactivating the specialist rank: specialist 3rd class (E-4, or SP3), specialist 2nd class (E-5, or SP2), specialist 1st class (E-6, or SP1) and master specialist (E-7, or MSP). The specialist insignia was the same smaller and narrower size as the old Goldenlite stripes to differentiate specialists from non-commissioned officers.

==== 1956–1985 ====
In 1956, the Army began wearing polished black leather boots instead of the traditional unpolished russet leather (as late as the early 1980s, older soldiers who had served before 1956 said they were in the "brown boot" army.), and the army green uniform (with Goldenlite-Yellow-on-green rank stripes) was adopted. The new enlisted rank insignia were then used on all Army uniforms (e.g., green, khaki, and fatigue). Enlisted rank insignia with a blue background was worn on the army blue dress uniform and a white background on the army white uniform.

Chevrons of 1958
E9	E8		E7	E6	E5	E4	E3
Sergeant major	First sergeant	Master sergeant	Sergeant first class	Staff sergeant	Sergeant	Corporal	Private first class
SGM	1SG	MSG	SFC	SSG	SGT	CPL	PFC

In 1957, a 2-inch-wide set of Goldenlite-yellow-on-blue stripes were worn with the new optional army blue WAC dress uniform. In 1959, a 2-inch-wide set of Goldenlite-yellow-on-green stripes were worn with the new army green WAC duty uniform; they replaced the taupe WAC service uniform by 1961. Although the WAC was disestablished in 1978, the army green WAC uniform would be in use until 1985.

In 1958, as part of a rank restructuring, two pay grades and four ranks were added: sergeant (E-5) returned to its traditional three chevron insignia, E-6 became staff sergeant, which had been eliminated in 1948 (with its previous three chevrons and one arc insignia), sergeant first class became E-7, master sergeant became E-8, which included first sergeant and specialist 8; and E-9, which included sergeant major and specialist 9. In 1959, the specialist insignia was made the same size and width as non-commissioned officer's stripes. In 1961, the wearing of large Goldenlite-yellow-on-green stripes was adopted for use on all Army uniforms (green, khaki, and fatigue) except for the Army dress blue uniform, which used large insignia with a blue background and army white uniform that used a white background. In 1965, the ranks of specialist 8 and specialist 9 were discontinued.

Specialist insignia of 1959
E9	E8	E7	E6	E5	E4
Specialist 9	Specialist 8	Specialist 7	Specialist 6	Specialist 5	Specialist 4
SP9	SP8	SP7	SP6	SP5	SP4

In 1966, the rank of Sergeant Major of the Army was established, its holder an advisor to the Army chief of staff. Considered a higher grade than sergeant major (or than command sergeant major from 1968), the Sergeant Major of the Army didn't receive its unique rank insignia until 1979. In 1968, the rank of command sergeant major was established as an assistant to the commanding officer at battalion, brigade, division, and corps levels. Also, that year the insignia of the private first class received one arc under the chevron. In 1978, the rank of specialist 7 was discontinued. In 1975, brass enlisted rank pins were created for wear on black epaulets with the Army green shirt and black "wooly-pully" sweater. In 1985, the ranks of specialist 5 and specialist 6 were discontinued.

==== Since 2000 ====
In 2006, the blue Army Service Uniform (ASU) was adopted to replace the army green uniform, and the yellow-on-blue stripes were reintroduced.

Subsequently, the blue uniform was returned to formal dress use only in 2020, as the army reintroduced a green daily service uniform modeled after the pinks and greens officers service uniform from World War II. The enlisted insignia on this uniform is pale tan stripes on an olive green background.

== Command roles ==
The headquarters of each company-sized unit is assigned a senior non-commissioned officer (NCO) who, as the highest-ranking enlisted person in the company/battery/troop, monitors the enlisted personnel and is their advocate with the commanding officer. This position is known as the "first sergeant," though the person carrying that title does not have to have that rank. In a battalion or larger unit, the senior NCO is a sergeant major. The rank of sergeant major is usually carried by the senior NCO of the S-3 staff section in a battalion, regiment, or a brigade, and in most staff sections in larger units. The command sergeant major fills an advisory function, assisting the commander of a battalion, regiment, brigade, or higher formation in personnel matters. The Sergeant Major of the Army has a similar role assisting the Army Chief of Staff.

In terms of command, the rank of a person typically determines what job and command the soldier has within a unit. For personnel in US Army mechanized infantry, a Bradley infantry fighting vehicle (M2A2) is commanded by a Staff Sergeant, the gun is operated by a Specialist or Sergeant and the driver is Specialist or below. For armor, the Abrams main battle tank (M1A2) is commanded by a captain, lieutenant, sergeant first class or staff sergeant, the gunner is a staff sergeant or sergeant, and the driver and loader are specialists or below.

== Forms of address ==
Forms of address specified in Army Regulation AR 600-20 Army Command Policy are: "Sergeant Major" and "First Sergeant" for those holding those ranks, and "Sergeant" for master sergeants, sergeants first class, staff sergeants, and sergeants. Corporals and specialists are addressed by their rank. Privates first class and privates (both PV1 and PV2) can all be addressed as "Private".

In some cases, informal titles are used. "Top" is commonly used as an informal address to first sergeants or anyone serving as a company first sergeant. In field artillery units a platoon sergeant (usually an E-7) is informally referred to as "Smoke" (from "chief of smoke", a reference to when units fired as whole batteries of between four and six guns, and the senior NCO position was "Chief of Firing Battery"). The junior E-7 position is designated as "Gunnery Sergeant" and similar to the USMC usage, is typically referred to as "Gunny". Field artillery cannon sections are led by section chiefs (usually an E-6) are often informally called "Chief". This does not seem to be common in other section-based unit subdivisions such as staff sections. In some smaller units, with more tight-knit squads, soldiers might call their squad leader "Boss", or a similar respectful term. A habit that has all but died out is the addressing of a platoon sergeant, in any unit other than artillery, being affectionately called a "platoon daddy" in casual conversation or jest (but never in any official communication of any type). In some training units (BCT and AIT or OSUT), trainees are called "Private", regardless of the rank worn. Special titles, such as "drill sergeant" and "gunnery sergeant" are specific to certain jobs (position title), and should not be confused for actual rank. Other services differ, such as the Marine Corps, which address each other by full rank.

Some terms are used jokingly when referring to a soldier's rank. For instance, specialists are sometimes jokingly referred to as "The E-4 Mafia" (referring to their pay grade of E-4), "Command Private Major", "Specialist Major", "Full-Bird Private" (from the eagle on their shield), "Sham Shield" (from their stereotype of "shamming it", or malingering), "PV4", or "Spec-4" (about the old specialist grades, which at one point went up to Specialist 9).

An E-2 Private may be referred to as "Private 2nd Class". Privates (PV2) rank insignia are sometimes called "Mosquito Wings" (from the appearance of the single chevron).

Privates are called "Buck Privates" because they are the lowest rank of private. An E-1 Private may be referred to as "E-Nothing", or "PV-Nothing" (as opposed to PV2, the next rank) due to their lack of rank insignia. E-1 Privates were also called a "Fuzzy" or "E-Fuzzy" during the war on terror era due to the bare velcro patch-holders on the Army Combat Uniform (ACU).

== Timeline of changes ==
This table shows changes in insignia since 1905.

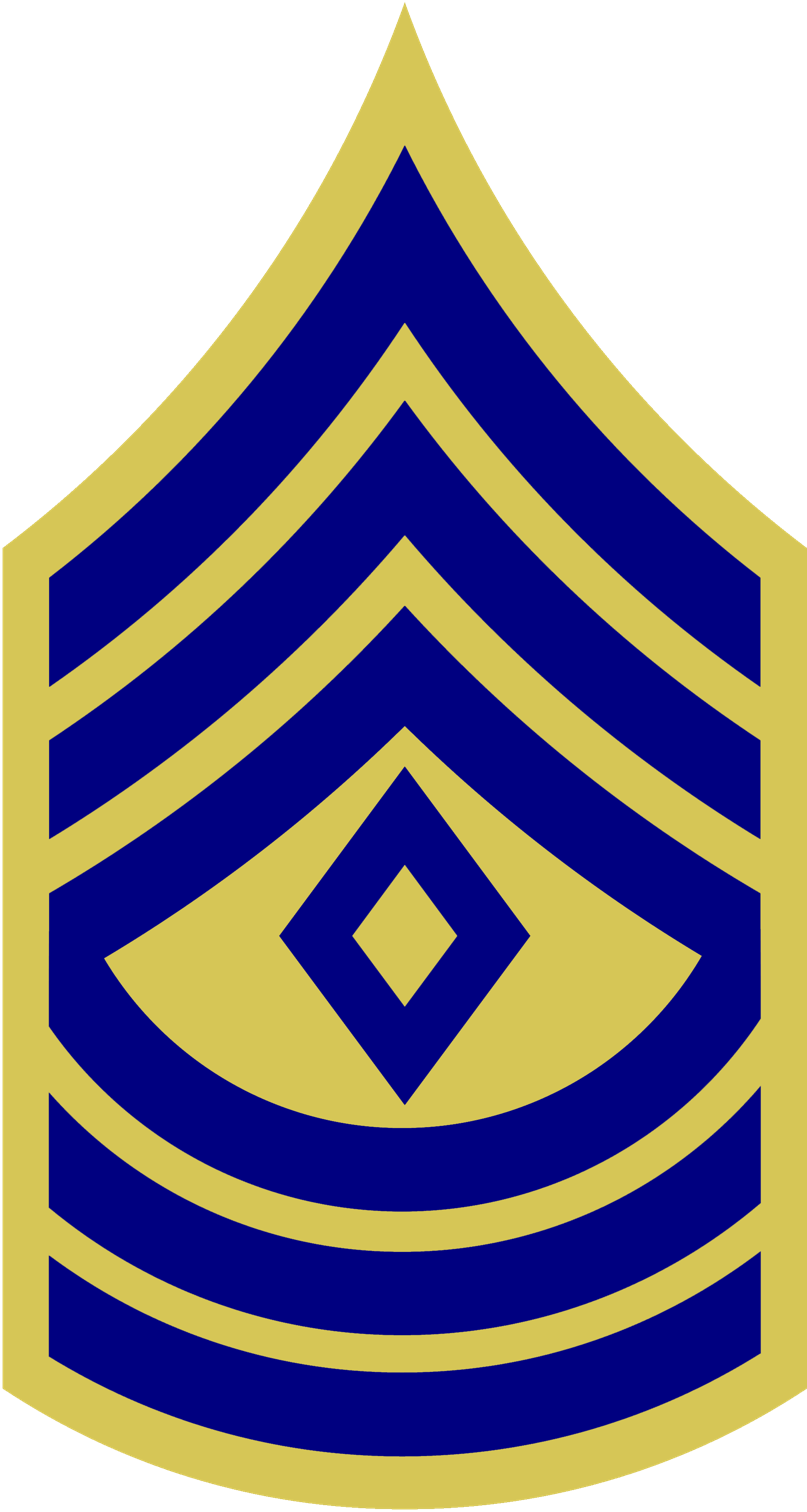
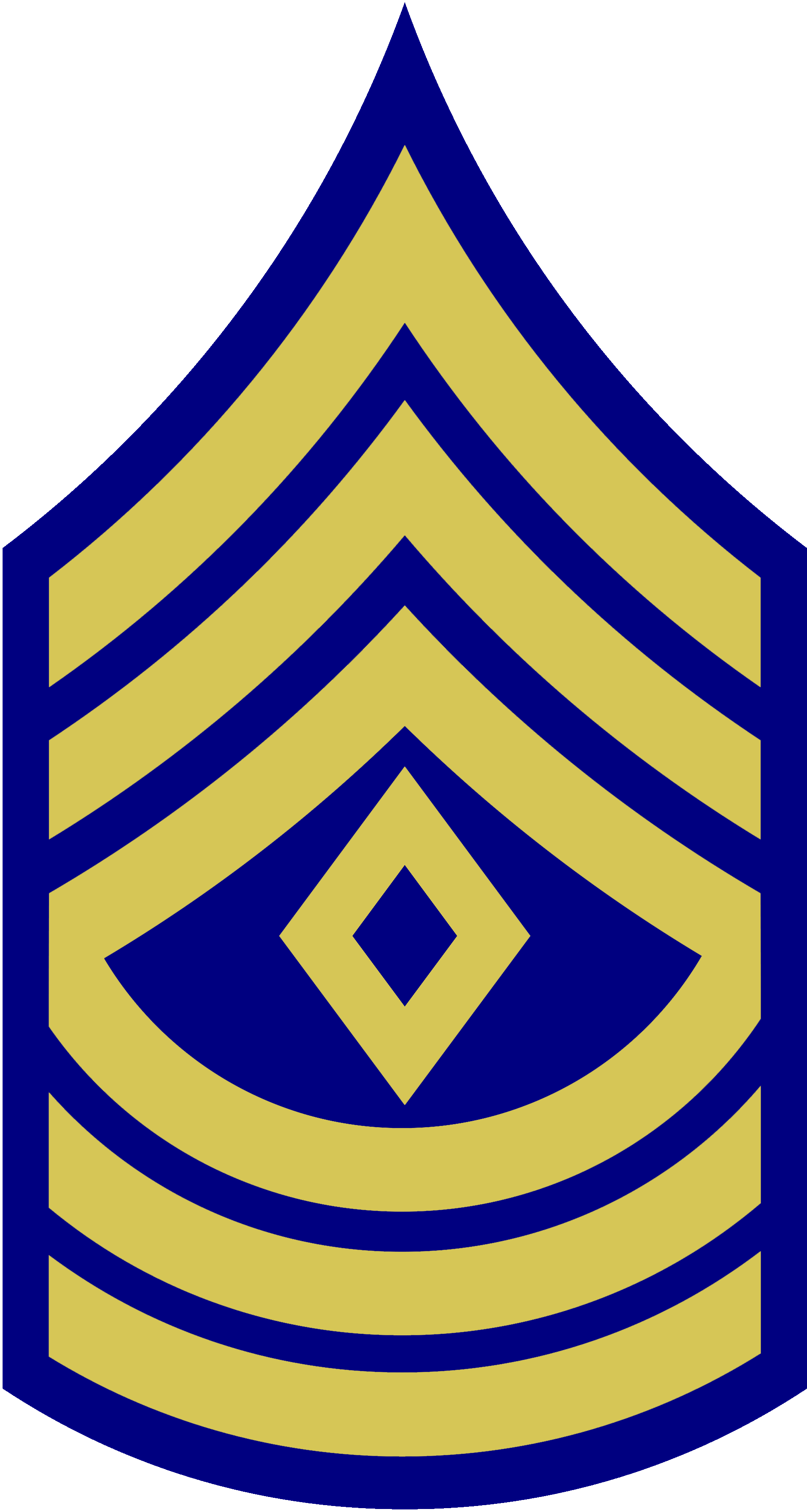
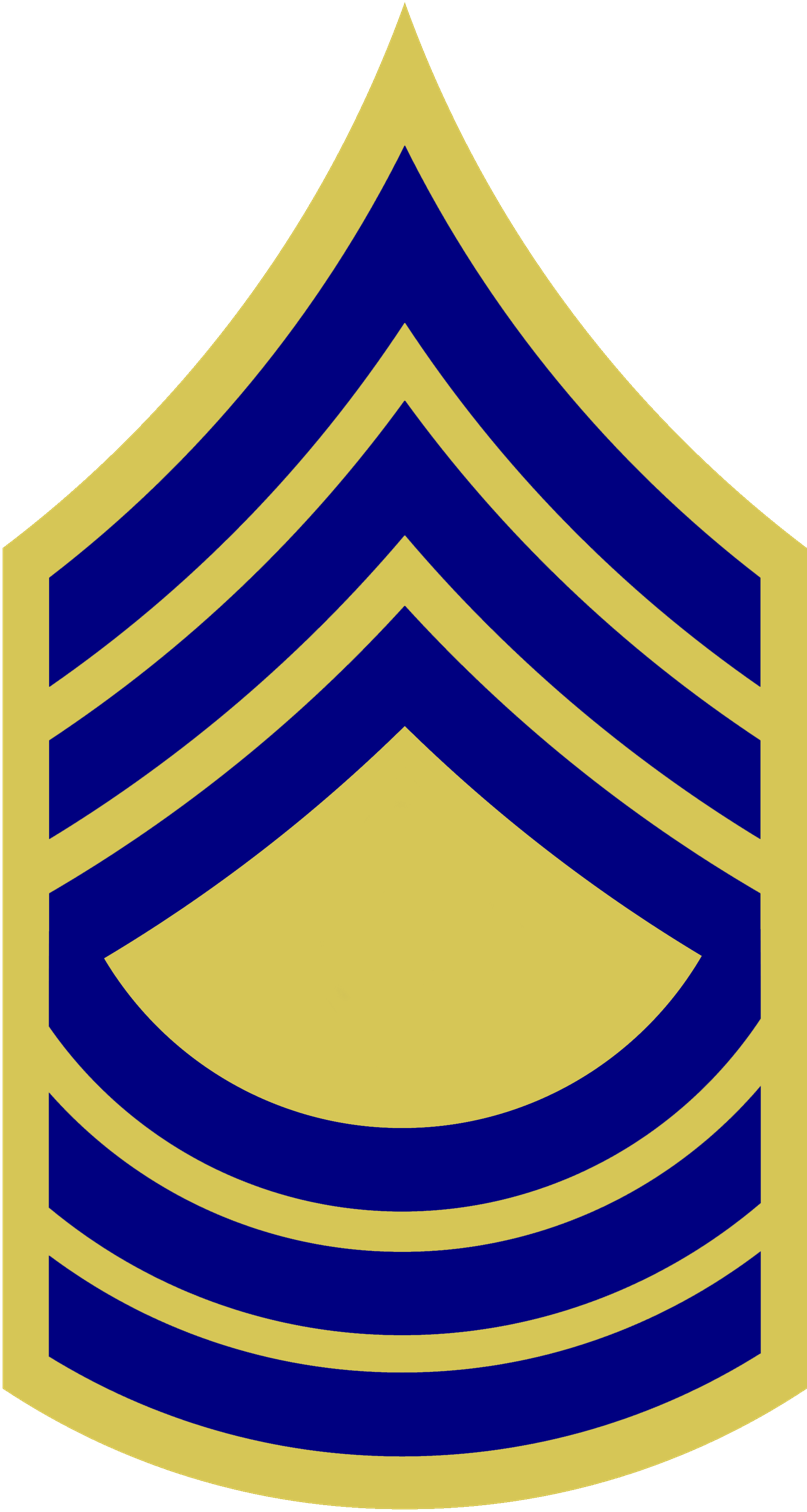
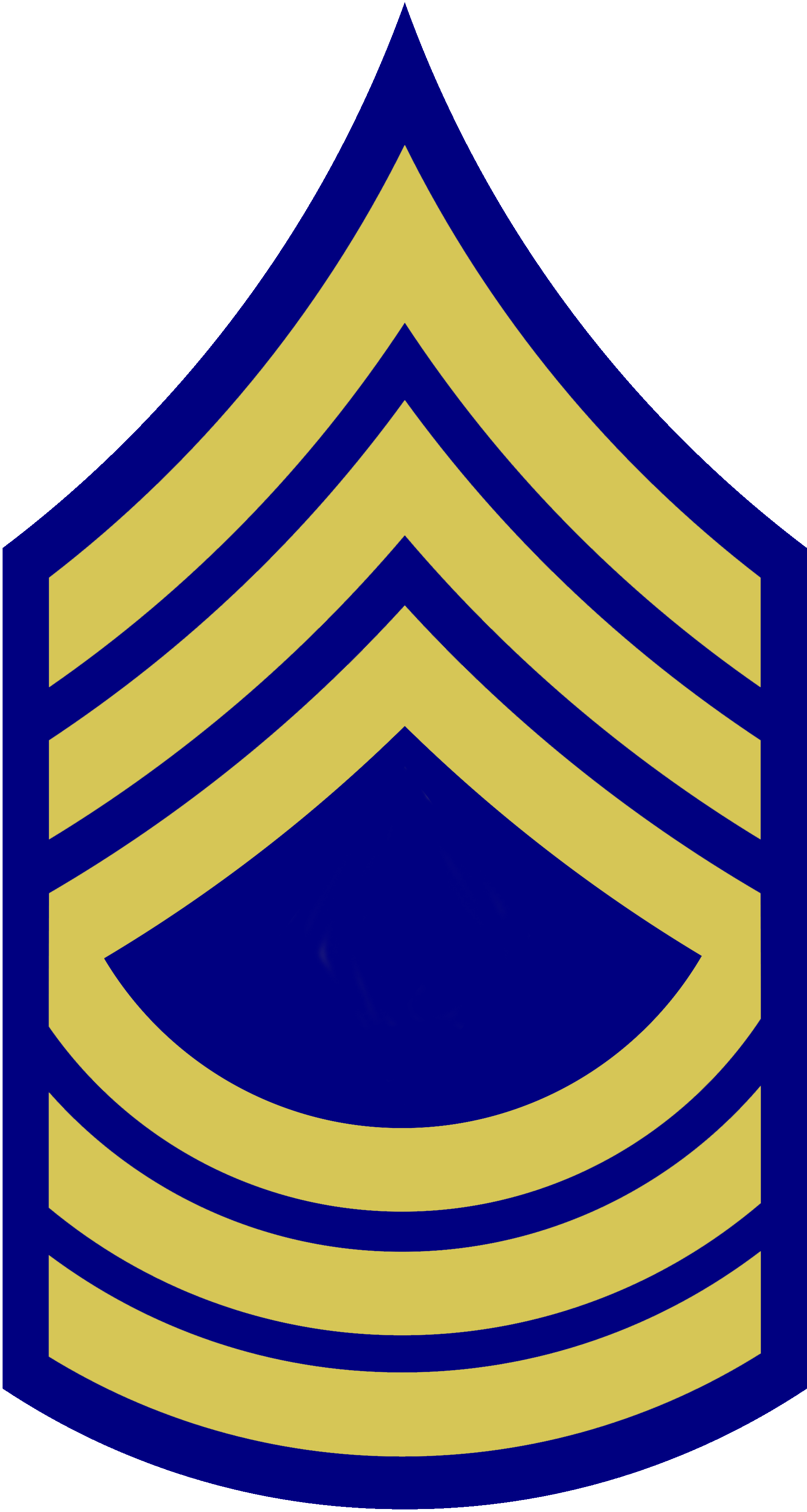
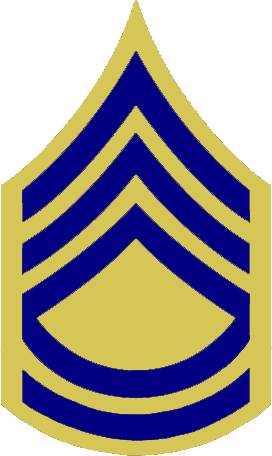
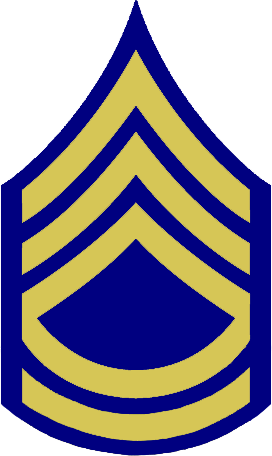
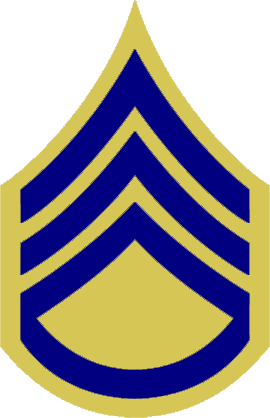
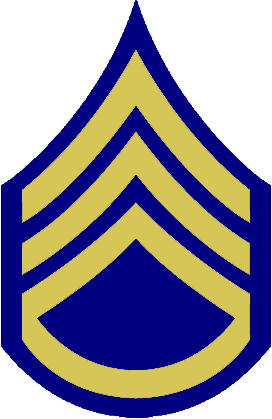
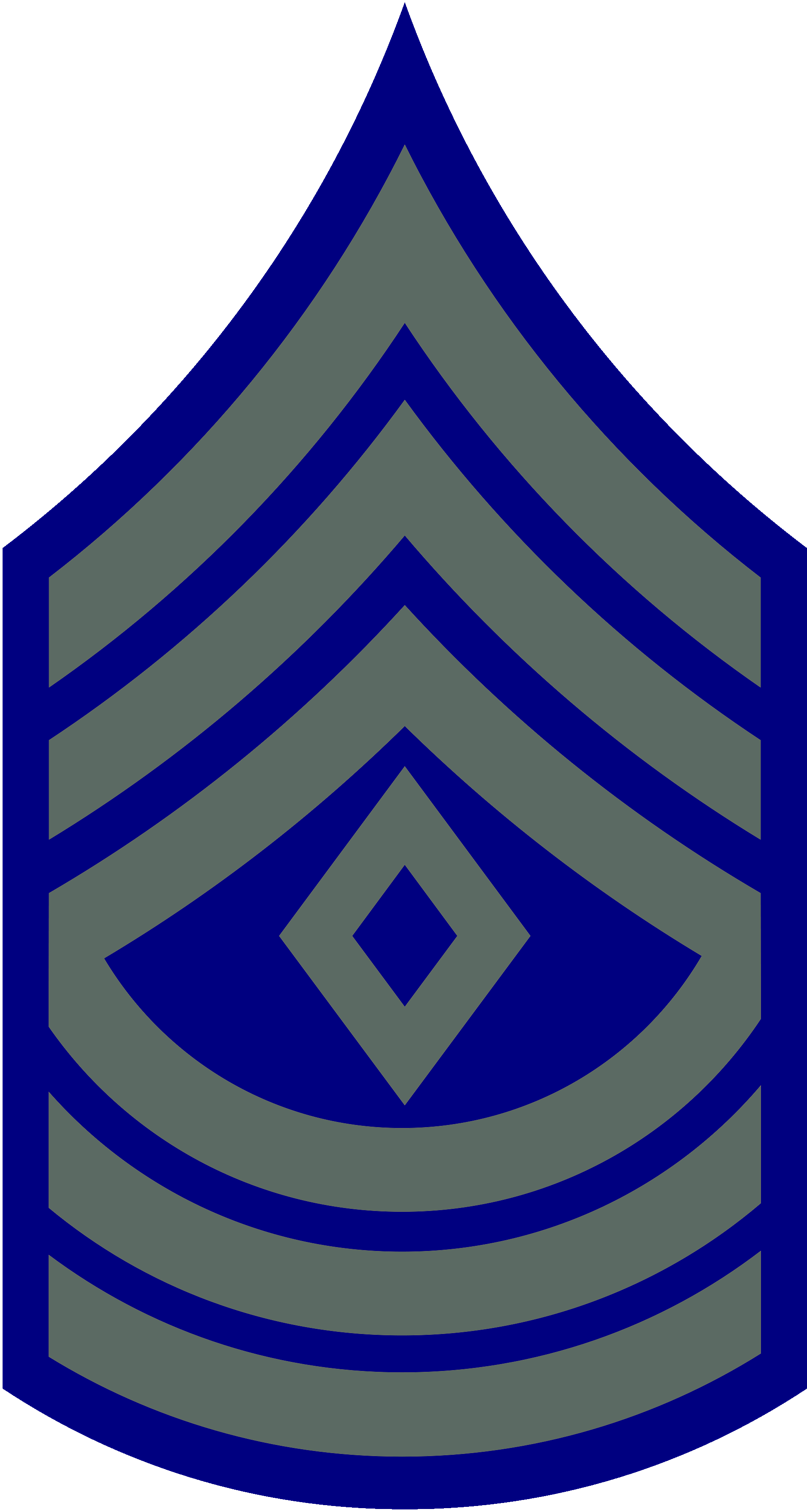
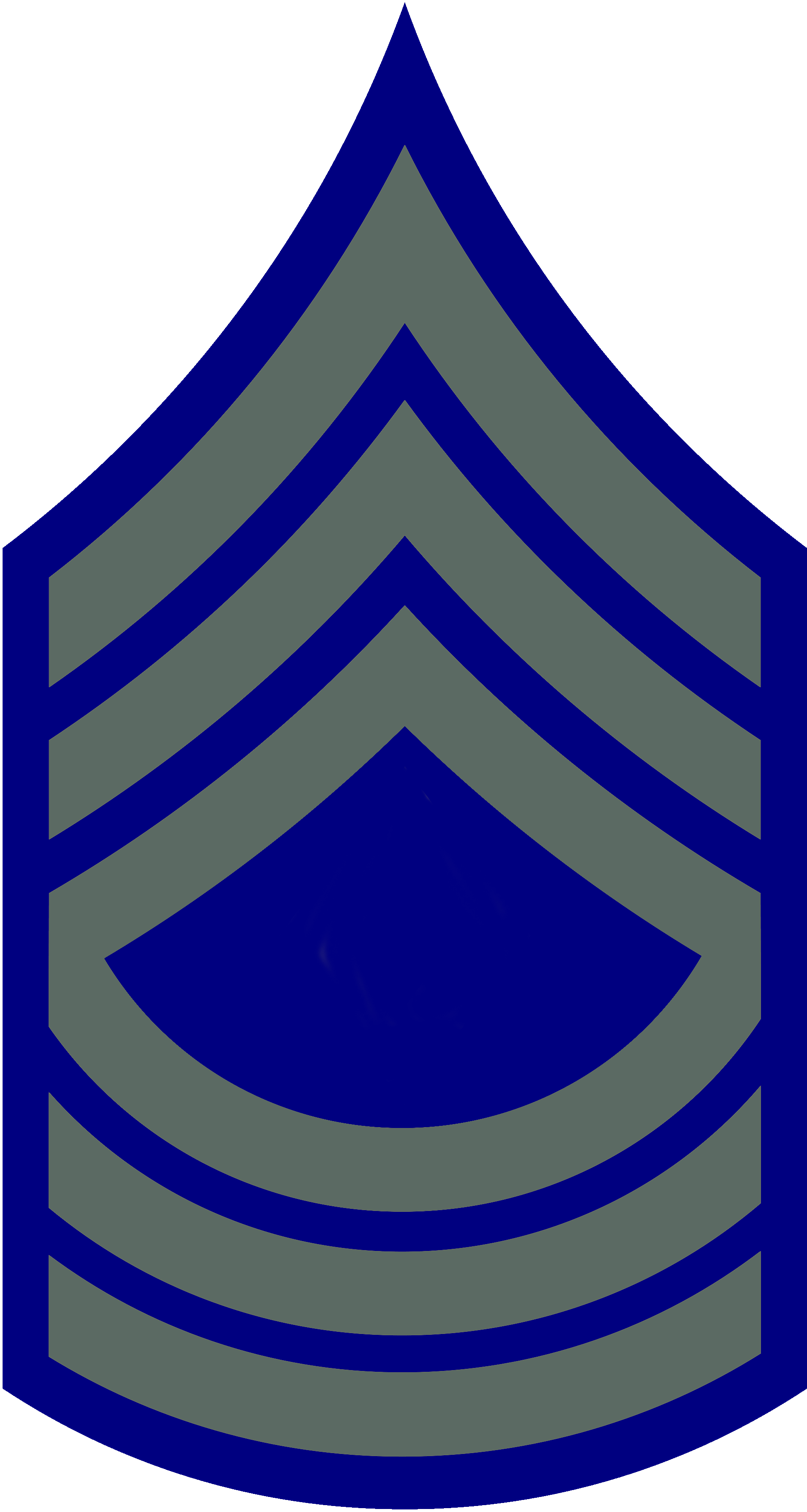
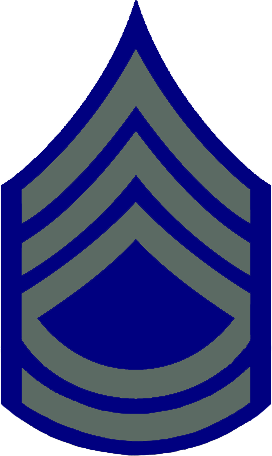
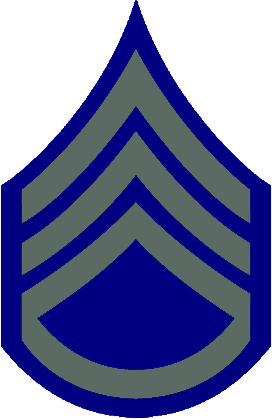
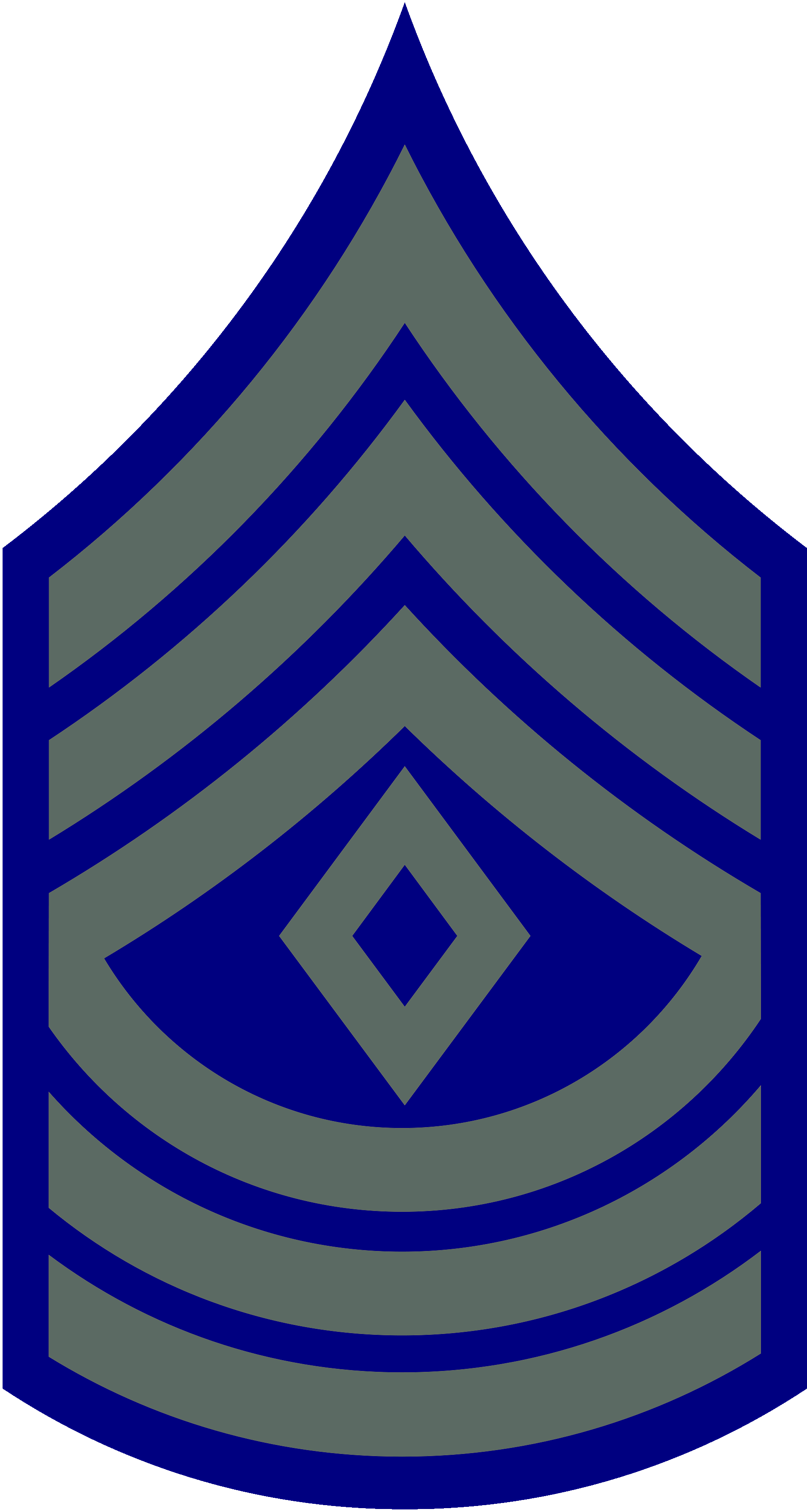
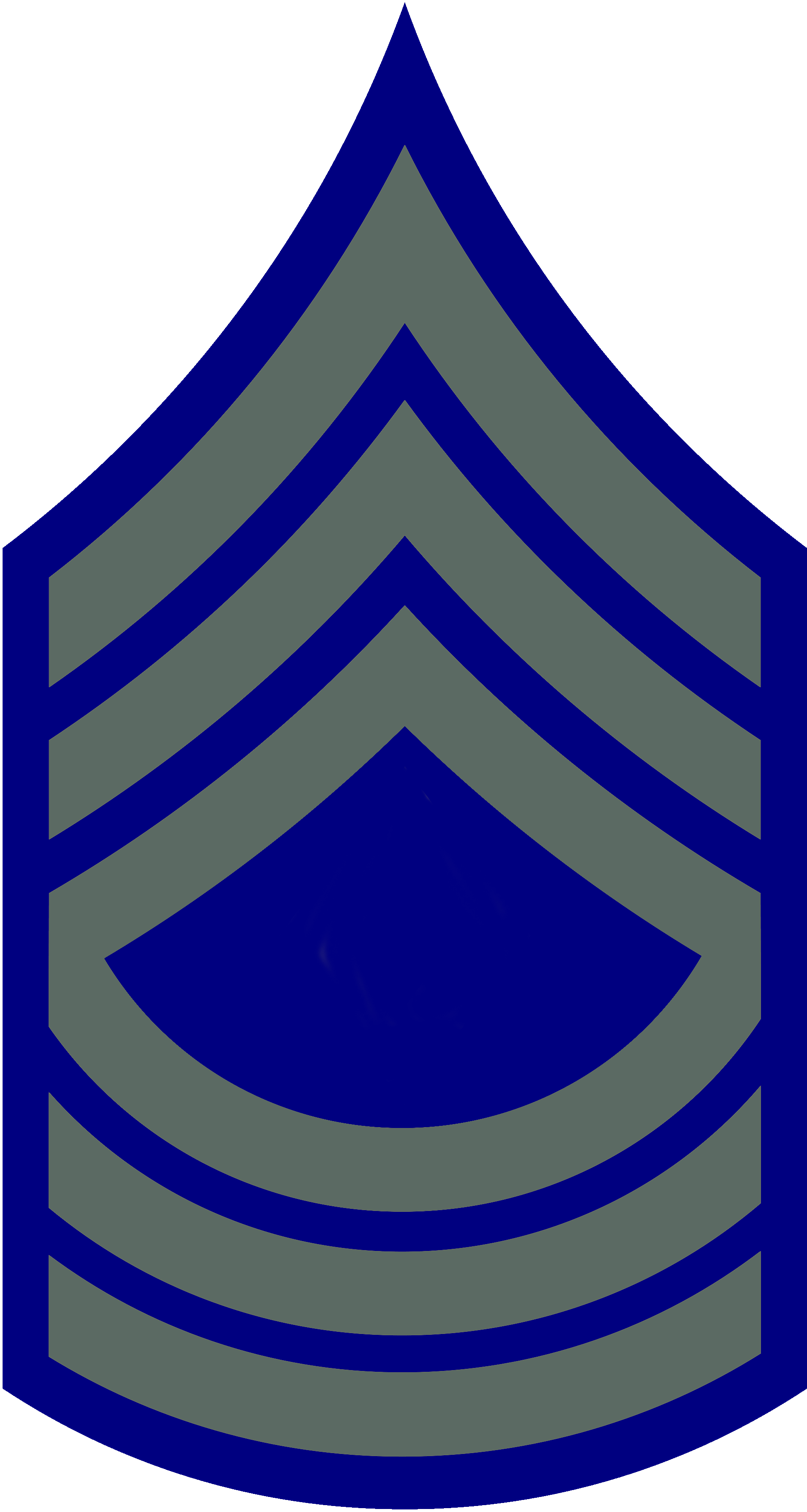
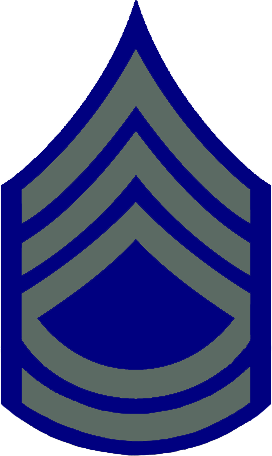
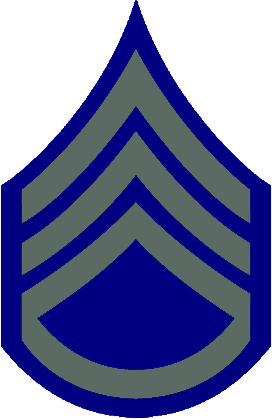
US DoD Pay Grade	Special			E-9		E-8			E-7			E-6		E-5		E-4		E-3		E-2	E-1
1905	No equivalent																				No insignia
1905	No equivalent								Regimental sergeant major	Regimental quartermaster sergeant	Battalion sergeant major	Color sergeant	First sergeant		Stable sergeant	Company quartermaster sergeant	Sergeant	Corporal			Private
1920	No equivalent																				No insignia
1920	No equivalent								Regimental sergeant major	Regimental supply sergeant	Battalion sergeant major	Color sergeant	First sergeant	Mess sergeant	Stable sergeant	Company supply sergeant	Sergeant	Corporal		Lance corporal/Private first class	Private
September 1920	No equivalent																				No insignia
September 1920	No equivalent								Master sergeant			First sergeant	Technical sergeant	Staff sergeant		Sergeant		Corporal		Private first class	Private
September 1942	No equivalent																				No insignia
September 1942	No equivalent								First sergeant	Master sergeant		Technical sergeant		Staff sergeant	Technician 3rd grade	Sergeant	Technician 4th grade	Corporal	Technician 5th grade	Private first class	Private
August 1948	No equivalent																			No insignia	No insignia
August 1948	No equivalent								First sergeant Combat and noncombat	Master sergeant Combat and noncombat		Sergeant first class Combat and noncombat		Sergeant; Combat and noncombat		Corporal; Combat and noncombat		Private first class Combat and noncombat		Private	Recruit
February 1951	No equivalent																			No insignia	No insignia
February 1951	No equivalent								First sergeant	Master sergeant		Sergeant first class		Sergeant		Corporal		Private first class		Private	Recruit
March 1955	No equivalent																			No insignia	No insignia
March 1955	No equivalent								First sergeant	Master sergeant	Master specialist	Sergeant first class	Specialist first class	Sergeant	Specialist 2nd class	Corporal	Specialist 3rd class	Private first class		Private second class E-2	Private E-1
September 1959	No equivalent																			No insignia	No insignia
September 1959				Sergeant major	Specialist 9	First sergeant	Master sergeant	Specialist 8	Sergeant first class		Specialist 7	Staff sergeant	Specialist 6	Sergeant	Specialist 5	Corporal	Specialist 4	Private first class		Private second class E-2	Private E-1
1965	No equivalent																			No insignia	No insignia
1965				Sergeant major		First sergeant	Master sergeant		Sergeant first class		Specialist 7	Staff sergeant	Specialist 6	Sergeant	Specialist 5	Corporal	Specialist 4	Private first class		Private second class E-2	Private E-1
May 1968	No equivalent																				No insignia
May 1968				Command sergeant major	Staff sergeant major	First sergeant	Master sergeant		Sergeant first class		Specialist 7	Staff sergeant	Specialist 6	Sergeant	Specialist 5	Corporal	Specialist 4	Private first class		Private second class E-2	Private E-1
1971	No equivalent																				No insignia
1971				Command sergeant major	Sergeant major	First sergeant	Master sergeant		Sergeant first class		Specialist 7	Staff sergeant	Specialist 6	Sergeant	Specialist 5	Corporal	Specialist 4	Private first class		Private second class E-2	Private E-1
1978	No equivalent																				No insignia
1978				Command sergeant major	Sergeant major	First sergeant	Master sergeant		Sergeant first class			Staff sergeant	Specialist 6	Sergeant	Specialist 5	Corporal	Specialist 4	Private first class		Private second class E-2	Private E-1
1979																					No insignia
1979	Sergeant major of the Army			Command sergeant major	Sergeant major	First sergeant	Master sergeant		Sergeant first class			Staff sergeant	Specialist 6	Sergeant	Specialist 5	Corporal	Specialist 4	Private first class		Private second class E-2	Private E-1
1985																					No insignia
1985	Sergeant major of the Army			Command sergeant major	Sergeant major	First sergeant	Master sergeant		Sergeant first class			Staff sergeant		Sergeant		Corporal	Specialist	Private first class		Private second class E-2	Private E-1
1994																					No insignia
1994	Sergeant major of the Army			Command sergeant major	Sergeant major	First sergeant	Master sergeant		Sergeant first class			Staff sergeant		Sergeant		Corporal	Specialist	Private first class		Private second class E-2	Private E-1
2019																					No insignia
2019	Senior enlisted advisor to the chairman		Sergeant major of the Army	Command sergeant major	Sergeant major	First sergeant	Master sergeant		Sergeant first class			Staff sergeant		Sergeant		Corporal	Specialist	Private first class		Private second class E-2	Private E-1
November 2024																					No insignia
November 2024	Senior enlisted advisor to the chairman	Sergeant major of the Army	Senior enlisted advisor to the chief of the National Guard Bureau	Command sergeant major	Sergeant major	First sergeant	Master sergeant		Sergeant first class			Staff sergeant		Sergeant		Corporal	Specialist	Private first class		Private second class E-2	Private E-1
NATO Code	OR-9					OR-8			OR-7			OR-6		OR-5		OR-4		OR-3		OR-2	OR-1

== See also ==
- United States Army officer rank insignia
- United States warrant officer rank insignia
